= List of shooting sports organizations =

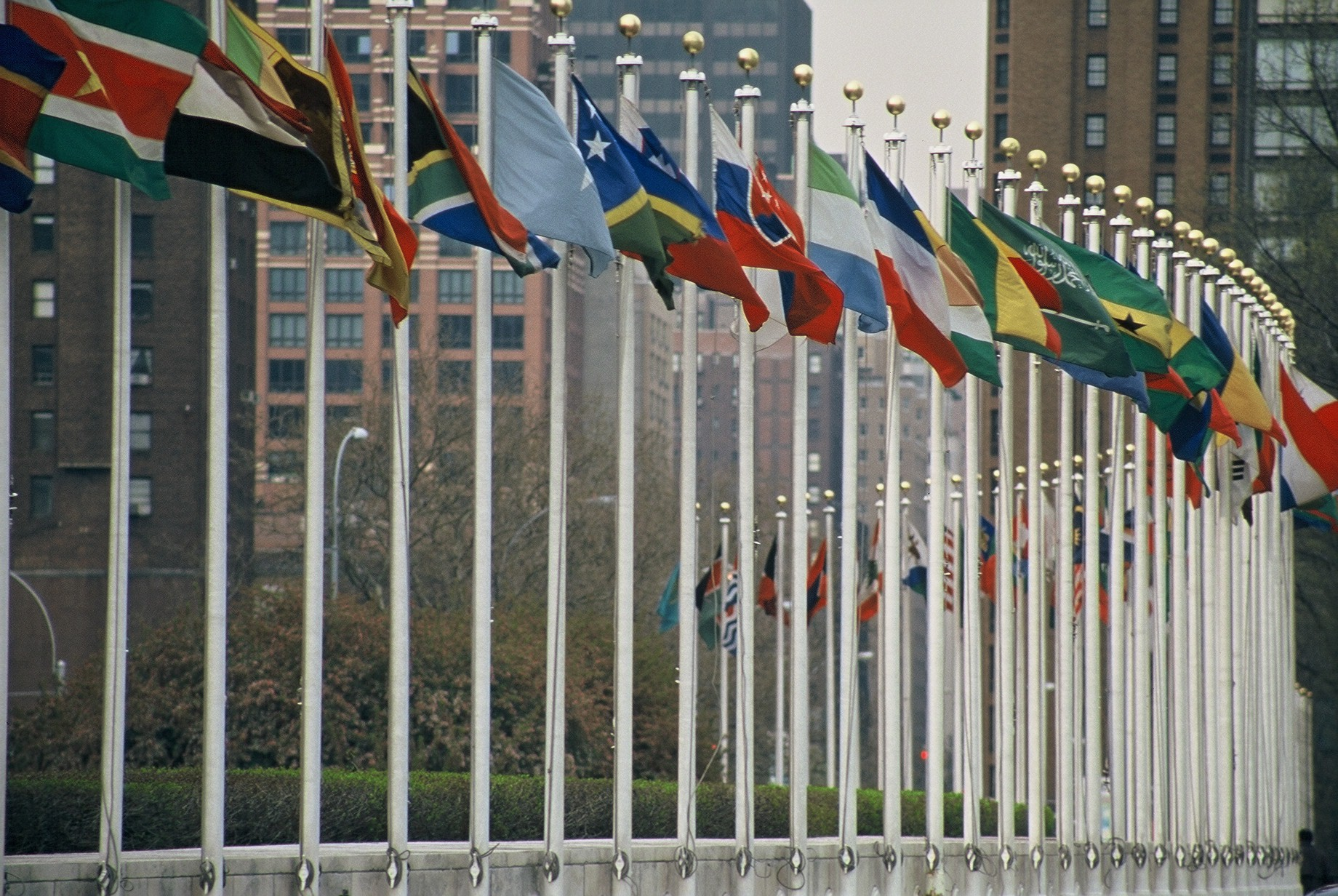
Sport shooting as a whole is one of the largest and most popular sports in the world.

This is a list of national and international shooting sports organizations who promote sport shooting to civilian sport shooters, hunters, police, military and/or military reservists.

== International governing bodies ==
Map of the world.

- Amateur Trapshooting Association (ATA)
- Cowboy Mounted Shooting Association (CMSA)
- Commonwealth Shooting Federation
- CMA - Competitive Marksman Action
- Fédération Internationale de Tir aux Armes Sportives de Chasse (FITASC) English: International Shooting Federation for Hunting Sports
- Interallied Confederation of Reserve Officers (CIOR)
- International Biathlon Union (IBU)
- International Confederation of Fullbore Rifle Associations (ICFRA)
- International Confederation of Revolver Enthusiasts (ICORE)
- International Crossbow Shooting Union (ICU), German: Internationale Armbrustschützen Union (IAU)
- International Defensive Pistol Association (IDPA)
- International Gallery Rifle Federation (IGRF)
- International Hunting Rifle Shooting Association (IHRSA)
- International Metallic Silhouette Shooting Union (IMSSU)
- International Military Sports Council (IMSC) French: Conseil International du Sport Militaire (CISM)
- International Police Sports Union (USIP), French: Union Sportive Internationale des Polices, Spanish: Unión Deportiva Policial Internacional
- International Practical Shooting Confederation (IPSC)
- International Precision Rifle Federation (IPRF)
- International Shooting Sport Federation (ISSF), formerly known as UTI from French: L’Union Internationale des Fédérations et Associations nationals de Tir (UTI), or in English: International Union of National Shooting Federations and Associations.
- International T-Class Confederation (ITCC)
- Single Action Shooting Society (SASS)
- Steel Challenge Shooting Association (SCSA)
- Union Internationale de Pentathlon Moderne (UIPM), (English: International Modern Pentathlon Union)
- World Archery Federation (WA), formerly known as FITA from French: Fédération Internationale de Tir à l'Arc
- World Association PPC 1500 (WA1500)
- World Benchrest Shooting Federation (WBSF)
- World Crossbow Shooting Association (WCSA)
- World Fast Draw Association (WFDA)
- World Field Target Federation (WFTF)
- World Forum on Shooting Activities (WFSA)
- World Shooting Para Sport, part of the International Paralympic Committee

== Africa ==
The African continent

=== African bodies ===
- African Shooting Sport Federation (ASSF), international member of ISSF.

=== African organizations by country ===
Algeria

- Algerian Shooting Sport Federation (Fédération Algérienne de Tir Sportif, FATS), international member of ISSF

Angola

- Angola Shooting Federation (Federacao Angolana de Tiro), international member of ISSF

Cameroon

- Cameroon Shooting Federation (Fédération Camerounaise de Tir Sportif), international member of ISSF

Egypt

- Egyptian Shooting Club
- Egyptian Shooting Federation, international member of ISSF

Ghana

- Ghana Shooting Sports Federation (GSSF), international member of ISSF

Kenya

- Kenya Sports Shooting Federation (KSSF), international member of ISSF

Libya

- Libyan Shooting Federation (LSF), international member of ISSF

Mauritania

- Mauritania Shooting Sport Federation (Fédération Mauritanienne de Tir Sportif), international member of ISSF

Morocco

- Moroccan Shooting Sports Federation (Fédération Royale Marocaine de Tir Sportif), international member of ISSF

Namibia

- Gun Owners Association of Namibia (GOAN)
- Clay Target Shooting Association of Namibia (CTSA)
- Namibian Practical Shooting Association, international member of IPSC
- Namibia Pistol Association (NPA)
- Namibian Hunting Rifle Shooting Association (NHRSA)
- Shooting Union of Namibia (SUN), international member of ISSF

Nigeria

- Nigeria Shooting Sport Federation (NSSF), international member of ISSF

Rwanda

- Rwanda Archery and Shooting Sports Federation (RASSF), international member of ISSF

Senegal

- Senegalese Shooting and Hunting Federation (Federation Senegalaise de Tir et de Chasse), international member of ISSF

South Africa

- Clay Target Shooting Association of South Africa (CTSASA)
- COMPAK South Africa (COMPAK SA)
- Confederation of Hunting Associations of South Africa (CHASA)
- East Rand Shooting Club
- Lowveld Sport Shooting Association (LSSA)
- Milnerton Shooting Association (MSA)
- South African Hunters and Game Conservation Association (SAJWV/SAHGCA) (South Africa Jagters-en Wildebewaringsvereniging)
- South Africa Sport and Hunting Federation (SASHF)
- South African Air Rifle Associations (SAARA)
- South African Benchrest Shooting Federation (SABSF)
- South African Bisley Union (SABU)
- South African Combat Rifle Association (SACRA)
- South African Defensive Pistol Association (SADPA)
- South African Field Target Airgun Association (SAFTAA)
- South African Hunting Rifle Association (SAHRA) (Jaggeweer Skietvereniging)
- South African Metallic Silhouette Shooting Association (SAMSSA) (Suid-Afrikaanse Metaal Silhoeet Skiet Vereniging)
- National Hunting and Shooting Association (NHSA)
- South African Pin Shooting Federation (SAPSF)
- South African Pistol Association (SAPA), international member of WA1500
- South African Practical Shooting Association (SAPSA), international member of IPSC
- South African Precision Sport Shooting Federation (SAPSSF)
- South African Shooting Sport Confederation (SASSCo)
- South African Tactical Shooting Association (SATSA)
- Western Shooters of South Africa (WSSA)
- MOSSC Sport Shooting Association (MOSSC)

Sudan

- Sudanese Shooting Federation (SSF), international member of ISSF

Tunisia

- Tunisian Shooting Federation (Federation Tunisienne de Tir), international member of ISSF

Uganda

- Uganda Shooting Sport Federation, international member of ISSF

Zimbabwe

- Zimbabwe Pistol and Smallbore Association, international member of IPSC.
- Zimbabwe Shooting Sport Federation, international member of ISSF.
- Zimbabwe Sport Shooting Federation, international member of IMSSU.

== Asia ==
The Asian continent

=== Asian bodies ===
- Asian Shooting Confederation (ASC), international member of ISSF.

=== Asian organizations by country ===
Afghanistan

- Afghanistan Shooting Sport Federation

Bahrain

- Bahrain Shooting Association, international member of ISSF.

Bangladesh

- Bangladesh Shooting Sport Federation, international member of ISSF.

Bhutan

- Bhutan Shooting Federation, international member of ISSF.

Cambodia

- IPSC Cambodia, international member of IPSC.

China

- China Practical Shooting Association, international member of IPSC.
- Chinese Shooting Association, international member of ISSF.
- Hong Kong Practical Shooting Association, international member of IPSC.
- Hong Kong Shooting Association, international member of ISSF.
- IPSC Macau Association, international member of IPSC.
- Macau China Shooting Association, international member of ISSF.

India

- National Rifle Association of India, international member of ISSF. National member of IOA.

Indonesia

- IPSC Indonesia, international member of IPSC.
- Indonesian Target Shooting and Hunting Association, international member of ISSF.

Iran

- Shooting Federation Islamic Republic of Iran, international member of ISSF.

Iraq

- Iraqi Shooting Federation, international member of ISSF.

Israel

- Israel Shooting Federation, international member of IPSC and ISSF.

Japan

- IPSC Japan, international member of IPSC.
- National Rifle Association of Japan, international member of ISSF.
- Japan Clay Target Shooting Association, international member of ISSF.

Jordan

- Jordanian Shooting Federation, international member of ISSF.

Kazakhstan

- Sport Shooting Federation Republic of Kazakhstan, international member of ISSF.

North Korea

- Shooting Association The Democratic People's Republic of Korea, international member of ISSF.

South Korea

- Korea Shooting Federation, international member of ISSF.

Kuwait

- IPSC Kuwait, international member of IPSC.
- Kuwait Shooting Federation, international member of ISSF.

Kyrgyzstan

- IPSC Kyrgyzstan, international member of IPSC.
- Kyrgyzstan Shooting Sport Federation, international member of ISSF.

Laos

- IPSC Laos, international member of IPSC.
- Lao Shooting Federation, international member of ISSF.

Lebanon

- Lebanon Shooting and Hunting Federation (Federation Libanaise de Tir et Chasse), international member of ISSF.

Malaysia

- IPSC Malaysia, international member of IPSC.
- National Shooting Association of Malaysia, international member of ISSF.

Maldives

- Shooting Association of Maldives, international member of ISSF.

Mongolia

- Mongolian Shooting Association, international member of IPSC.
- Mongolian Shooting Sport Federation, international member of ISSF.
- Mongolian Defensive Pistol Association, international member of IDPA.

Myanmar

- Myanmar Shooting Sport Federation, international member of ISSF.

Nepal

- Nepal Shooting Association, international member of ISSF.

Oman

- Oman Shooting Association, international member of ISSF.

Pakistan

- National Rifle Association of Pakistan, international member of ISSF, ASC. National member of PSB, POA.

Philippines

- Philippine National Shooting Association (PNSA), international member of ISSF.
- Philippine Practical Shooting Association (PPSA), international member of IPSC.
- Philippine Shooters and Match Officers Confederation (PSMOC)

Qatar

- Qatar Shooting and Archery Association, international member of ISSF.

Saudi Arabia

- Saudi Arabian Shooting Federation, international member of ISSF.

Singapore

- Dynamic Shooting Association Singapore, international member of IPSC.
- Singapore Shooting Association, international member of ISSF.

Sri Lanka

- IPSC Sri Lanka, international member of IPSC.
- National Shooting Sport Federation of Sri Lanka, international member of ISSF.

Syria

- Syrian Arab Shooting Federation, international member of ISSF.

Taiwan

- Chinese Taipei Shooting Association, international member of ISSF.
- IPSC Taiwan, international member of IPSC.

Tajikistan

- Tajikistan Sport Shooting Federation (TSSF), international member of ISSF.

Thailand

- Thailand Practical Shooting Association, international member of IPSC.
- National Shooting Sport Association of Thailand, international member of ISSF.
- Skeet and Trap Shooting Association of Thailand, international member of ISSF.

Timor-Leste/East Timor

- East Timor (Timor Leste) Shooting Federation, international member of ISSF.

Turkey

- Turkey Practical Shooting Association, international member of IPSC.
- Turkish Shooting and Hunting Federation (Türkiye Aticilik ve Avcilik Federasyonu), international member of ISSF.

Turkmenistan

- Shooting Sports Federation of Turkmenistan, international member of ISSF.

United Arab Emirates

- United Arab Emirates Shooting Association, international member of ISSF.

Uzbekistan

- Sport Shooting Federation of Uzbekistan, international member of ISSF.

Vietnam

- Vietnam Shooting Federation, international member of ISSF.

Yemen

- Yemen Shooting Federation, international member of ISSF.

== Europe ==
The European continent

=== European bodies ===
- European Shooting Confederation (ESC), international member of ISSF.
- European Benchrest Shooting Federation (EBSF), international member of WBSF.
- European Field Target Federation, international member of WFTF.
- European Shooting Sports Forum (ESSF), informal policy association of trade and shooting bodies.
- Federation of Associations for Hunting and Conservation of the EU (FACE)

=== European organizations by country ===
Albania

- Albanian Shooting Sport Federation, international member of ISSF.

Andorra

- Federacio Andorrana de Tir, international member of ISSF.

Armenia

- IPSC Armenia, international member of IPSC.
- Armenian Shooting Federation, international member of ISSF.

Austria

- Association for Large Caliber Sport Shooting Austria (Verband für sportliches Grosskaliberschießen Österreich, VSG), international member of WA1500.
- Austrian Association for Practical Shooting, international member of IPSC.
- Austria Clay Target and Combined Shooting Federation (Austria Sportsch. Fachverb. Wurfsch.u.Kombination), international member of ISSF.
- Austrian Shooting Sport Federation (Österreichischer Schützenbund), international member of ISSF, MLAIC, IAU. National member of BSO.
- Austrian Metallic Silhouette and Field Target Association, international member of IMSSU.

Azerbaijan

- Shooting Federation of Azerbaijan Republic, international member of ISSF.

Belarus

- Belarusian Federation of Practical Shooting, international member of IPSC.
- Belarusian Shooting Sport Federation, international member of ISSF.

Belgium

- Belgian Field Target Association, international member of WFTF
- Belgian Parcours Shooting Association, international member of IPSC.
- Royal Belgian Shooting Sport Federation, international member of ISSF.
- Belgian Clay Shooting Federation (Federation Belge de Tir aux Clays), international member of ISSF.

Bosnia and Herzegovina

- IPSC Bosnia Herzegovina, international member of IPSC.
- Shooting Federation of Bosnia and Herzegovina, international member of ISSF.

Bulgaria

- Bulgarian Airgun Field Target Association, international member of WFTF
- Bulgarian Dynamic Shooting Federation, international member of IPSC.
- Bulgarian Shooting Union, international member of ISSF.
- Bulgarian T-Class Federation, international member of ITCC.
- Bulgarian Trap and Skeet Federation, international member of ISSF.

Channel Islands

- Channel Islands Practical Shooting Association, international member of IPSC.

Croatia

- Croatian Practical Shooting Association, international member of IPSC.
- Croatian Shooting Federation, international member of ISSF.

Cyprus

- IPSC Cyprus, international member of IPSC.
- Cyprus Shooting Sport Federation, international member of ISSF.

Czech Republic

- Czech Benchrest Association, international member of WRABF, ERABSF .
- Practical Shooting Association of the Czech Republic, international member of IPSC.
- Czech Shooting Federation, international member of ISSF.

Denmark

- Danish Blackpowder Shooters (Danske Sortkrudtsskytter)
- Danish Sport Shooting Association (Dansk Sportsskytte Forbund, DSF), international member of IPSC.
- Danish Shooting Union (Dansk Skytte Union, DSU), international member of ISSF.
- Danish Gymnastics and Sports Associations, Shooting (DGI Shooting), Danish: Danske Gymnastik- & Idrætsforeninger, Skyting (DGI Skyting).

Estonia

- Estonian Field Target Association, international member of WFTF
- Estonian Practical Shooting Association, international member of IPSC.
- Estonian Shooting Sport Federation, international member of ISSF.

Finland

- Finnish Shooting Sport Federation (Suomen Ampumaurheiluliitto), international member of IPSC, ISSF, IMSSU, WBSF.
- Finnish Reservist Sports Federation (see SRA-shooting)

France

- French Shooting Federation (Federation Française de Tir) (FFTir), international member of IPSC, ISSF, IMSSU.

Georgia

- Georgian National Shooting Federation, international member of ISSF.

Germany

- Bavarian comrades 'and soldiers' association (Bayerische Kameraden- und Soldatenvereinigung, BKS)
- Bavarian Soldiers' Association 1874 eV (Bayerischer Soldatenbund 1874, BS)
- Union of Historical German Shooters (Bund der Historischen Deutschen Schützenbruderschaften, BHDS)
- Association of Reserves of the German Armed Forces (Verband der Reservisten der Deutschen Bundeswehr, VRDB)
- Federation of German Marksmen (Bund Deutscher Sportschützen, BDS), international member of IPSC, IMSSU and WFTF.
- Federation of Military and Police Aids (Bund der Militär- und Polizeischützen, BDMP)
- Free shooters in Germany (Freie Schützen in Deutschland)
- German Shooting and Archery Federation (Deutscher Schützenbund, DSB), international member of ISSF, MLAIC, WA, IAU. National member of DOSB.
- German Shooting Union (Deutsche Schießsport Union, DSU)
- Kyffhäuserbund eV (Kyffhäuserbund), a War Veterans' and Reservists' Association which focuses on shooting sports.

Gibraltar

- Gibraltar Pistol Association, international member of IPSC.
- Gibraltar Target Shooting Association, international member of the Commonwealth Shooting Federation.

Greece

- Hellenic Shooting Federation, international member of IPSC and ISSF.

Hungary

- Dynamic Shooting Sport Federation of Hungary, international member of IPSC.
- Hungarian Field Target Association, international member of WFTF
- Hungarian Shooting Federation (Magyar Sportlövö Szövetseg), international member of ISSF.

Iceland

- Icelandic Shooting Sports Federation (Skotiprottasamband Islands, STI), international member of ISSF.

Ireland

- National Association of Sporting Rifle & Pistol Clubs (NASRPC), international member of IGRF.
- Irish Target Sports, international member of IPSC.
- Target Shooting Ireland CLG, international member of ISSF.
- Irish Clay Target Shooting Association, international member of ISSF.

Isle of Man

- Isle of Man Target Shooting Federation, international member of IPSC.

Italy

- Italian Dynamic Shooting Federation, international member of IPSC.
- Italian Field Target Association, international member of WFTF
- Italian Shooting Union (Unione Italiana di Tiro a Segno), international member of ISSF.
- Federazione Italiana Tiro a Volo, international member of ISSF.

Kazakhstan

- IPSC Kazakhstan, international member of IPSC.

Kosovo

- Kosovo Shooting Sport Federation, international member of ISSF.

Latvia

- IPSC Latvia, international member of IPSC.
- Latvian Shooting Federation, international member of ISSF.

Liechtenstein

- Liechtenstein Shooting Association (Verband Liechtensteiner Schützenvereine), international member of ISSF.

Lithuania

- Lithuanian Field Target Shooting Association, international member of WFTF
- Lithuania Practical Shooting Sport Federation, international member of IPSC.
- Lithuanian Shooting Sport Union, international member of ISSF.
- Lithuania Defence Pistol Shooting Association, international member of IDPA
- Lithuanian Long Range Shooting Federation, international member of ICFRA and ITCC.
- Lietuvos Šaudymo Į Lauko Taikinius Asociacija, international member of WFTF

Luxembourg

- Luxembourg Shooting Federation (Federation Luxembourgeoise de Tir aux Armes Sportives), international member of ISSF.

Macedonia

- Macedonian Sport Shooting Federation (Makedonska Sportska Strelacka Federacija), international member of ISSF.

Malta

- Association of Maltese Arms Collectors and Shooters, a Maltese umbrella association for sport shooting and arms collectors, international member of FESAC, WFTF, IPSC, WCSA, IMSSU.
- Malta Shooting Sport Federation, international member of ISSF.

Moldova

- IPSC Moldova, international member of IPSC.
- Shooting Federation of the Republic of Moldova, international member of ISSF.

Monaco

- Monaco Shooting Federation (Federation Monegasque de Tir), international member of IPSC, ISSF, FITASC.

Montenegro

- Montenegrin Practical Shooting Association, international member of IPSC.
- Shooting Federation of Montenegro (Streljacki Savez Crne Gore), international member of ISSF.

Netherlands

- Action Shooting Nederland (ASN)
- Association for Practical Shooting- Dynamic Service Rifle (APS-DSR)
- Dutch Field Target Association, international member of WFTF
- Dutch Subgun Competition (DSC)
- Netherlands Practical Shooting Association (Nederlandse Parcours Schutters Associatie, NPSA), international member of IPSC.
- Netherlands Royal Shooting Sport Association (Koninklijke Nederlandse Schutters Associatie, KNSA), international member of ISSF, MLAIC.

Northern Ireland

- Northern Ireland Practical Shooting Confederation, international member of IPSC.
- Northern Ireland Federation of Shooting Sports (NIFSS)

Norway

- Det frivillige Skyttervesen (DFS)
- Dynamic Sports Shooting Norway (Dynamisk Sportsskyting Norge, DSSN), international member of IPSC.
- Norwegian Armed Forces Shooting Committee (Forsvarets Skyteutvalg, FSU), international member of CISM.
- Norwegian Association of Hunters and Anglers (Norges Jeger- og Fiskerforbund, NJFF), international member of FACE.
- Norwegian Benchrest Shooting Association (Norges Benkeskytterforbund, NBSF), international member of WBSF and WRABF.
- Norwegian Black Powder Union (Norsk Svartkruttunion, NSU), international member of MLAIC.
- Norwegian Biathlon Association (Norges Skiskytterforbund, NSSF), international member of IBU. National member of NIF.
- Norwegian Bow Shooting Association (Norges Bueskytterforbund, NBSF), international member of WAF. National member of NIF.
- Norwegian Company Sports Association (Norges Bedriftsidrettsforbund, NBIF), national member of NIF.
- Norwegian Longbow Association (Norsk Langbuelag, NL)
- Norwegian Metal Silhouette Association (Norges Metallsilhuettforbund, NMF), international member of IMSSU.
- Norwegian Police Sports Association (Norges Politiidrettsforbund), international member of USPE.
- Norwegian Shooting Association (Norges Skytterforbund, NSF), international member of ISSF and WA1500. National member of NIF.
- Norwegian Reserve Officers' Federation (Norske Reserveoffiserers Forbund, NROF)
- Scandinavian Western Shooters (SWS), international member of SASS

Poland

- Polish Field Target Association, international member of WFTF
- Polish Sport Shooting Federation (Polski Zwiazek Strzelectwa Sportowego), international member of IPSC and ISSF.

Portugal

- Portuguese Field Target Association, international member of WFTF
- Portuguese Shooting Federation (Federacao Portuguesa de Tiro), international member of IPSC and ISSF.
- Portuguese Bow Shooting Federation (Federacao Portuguesa de Tiro con Armas de Caça), international member of ISSF.

Romania

- Romanian Dynamic Shooting Association, international member of IPSC.
- Romanian Shooting Sport Federation (Federatia Romana de Tir Sportiv), international member of ISSF.
- Romanian Sport Shooting Federation, international member of WA 1500 PPC

Russia

- Russian Federation of Practical Shooting (Federatsia Prakticheskoi Strelbi Rossii), international member of IPSC.
- Russian Shooting Union (Strelkovii Soyuz Rossii, SSR), the successor of the Federation and the bullet trap shooting USSR, international member of ISSF.
- Russian High Precision Shooting Federation, international member of ITCC.

San Marino

- San Marino Shooting Federation (Federazione Sammarinese Tiro a Segno), international member of ISSF .
- San Marino Target Shooting Federation (Federazione Sammarinese Tiro a Volo), international member of ISSF (clay pigeon).

Serbia

- Serbian Association for Practical Shooting, international member of IPSC.
- Serbian Shooting Sport Federation, international member of ISSF.

Slovakia

- Slovak Airgun Field Target Association, international member of WFTF
- Slovak Association for Dynamic Shooting, international member of IPSC.
- Slovak Shooting Federation (Slovensky Strelecky Zvaz), international member of ISSF.

Slovenia

- Action Shooting Association of Slovenia (Akcijska strelska zveza društev Slovenije), International member of IDPA, Steel Challenge, IASC
- Slovenian Association for Practical Shooting, international member of IPSC.
- Shooting Union of Slovenia (Strelska zveza Slovenije), international member of ISSF.

Spain

- Royal Spanish Olympic Shooting Federation (Real Federacion Espanola de Tiro Olimpico), international member of IPSC and ISSF.

Sweden

- Hunters National Association / Rural Hunters (Jägernas riksforbund/ landsbygdens jägare)
- Swedish Biathlon Association (Svenska Skidskyttedförbundet)
- Swedish Blacpowder Shooting Association (Svenska Svartkruts Skytte Federationen)
- Swedish Archery Association (Svenska Bågskytteförbundet), international member of WA.
- Swedish Crossbow Association (Svenska Armborst Unionen)
- Swedish Dynamic Sports Shooting Association (Svenska Dynamiska Sportskytteförbundet), international member of IPSC.
- Swedish Hunters Association (Svenska Jägareförbundet), see also Jägarnas riksförbund and Konungens jaktklubb
- Swedish Pistol Shooting Association (Svenska Pistolskytteförbundet, SPSF), international member of WA1500.
- Swedish Shooting Sport Federation (Svenska Skyttesportförbundet, SvSF), international member of ISSF.
  - The Swedish Shooting Sport Federation was formed in 2009 with the fusion of The Swedish Sport Shooting Federation (Svenska Sportskytteförbundet, SSF), The Voluntary Shooting Movement (Frivilliga Skytterörelsen, FSR) and The Youth Association of the Shooting Movement (Skytterörelsens Ungdomsorganisation, Skytte UO).
- Swedish Western Shooting Association (Svenska Westernskytteförbundet)

Switzerland

- Association of Swiss muzzle loaders (Verband Schweizer Vorderladerschützen, Arquebusiers Suisse, Tiro Avancarica Svizzera)
- Swiss Crossbow Federation Eidgenössischen Armbrustschützenverband)
- Swiss Clay Shooting Federation
- Swiss Dynamic Shooting Federation (Schweizer Verband für Dynamisches Schiessen), international member of IPSC.
- Swiss Metallic Silhouette Shooting Association (Verein Schweizerischer Metallsilhouetten-Schützen)
- Swiss Shooting Sport Federation (Schweizer Schiesssportverband, SSV), international member of ISSF.
- Swiss Fifty Calibre Shooters Association (FCSA)

Ukraine

- Ukrainian Practical Shooting Association, international member of IPSC.
- Federation of Practical Shooting of Ukraine (FPSU)
- Ukrainian Shooting Federation, international member of ISSF.
- Ukraine Sporting Federation (USF), international member of FITASC

United Kingdom

- British Association for Shooting and Conservation (BASC)
- British Field Target Association
- British International Clay Target Shooting Federation, international member of FITASC.
- British Shooting, international member of ISSF.
- Channel Islands Practical Shooting Association (CIPSA)
- Clay Pigeon Shooting Association (CPSA)
- English Target Shooting Federation (ETSF)
- Muzzle Loaders Association of Great Britain (MLAGB)
- National Rifle Association (NRA)
- National Smallbore Rifle Association (NSRA)
- Scottish Target Shooting (STS)
- United Kingdom Practical Shooting Association (UKPSA), international member of IPSC.
- Welsh Target Shooting Federation (WTSF)
- The Historical Breechloading Smallarms Association (HBSA)

== North and South America ==
=== American bodies ===
- Shooting Confederation of the Americas (SCA) (Confederacion Americas de Tiro, CAT), international member of ISSF.
- The West Indies Fullbore Shooting Council (WIFSC), international member of ICFRA.

=== North American organizations by country ===
North America

Canada

- Canadian Field Target Association, international member of WFTF
- Canadian Police Combat Association (CPCA), international member of WA1500.
- Canadian Shooting Sports Association (CSSA)
- Dominion of Canada Rifle Association (DCRA)
- IDPA Canada, international member of IDPA.
- IPSC Canada, international member of IPSC.
- National Firearms Association (NFA)
- National Sporting Clays Association Canada (NSCA)
- Shooting Federation of Canada (SFC), international member of ISSF.
- The Silhouette Rifle Association of Canada (SRAC)

Mexico

- Mexican Hunting and Shooting Federation (Federacion Mexicana de Tiro y Caza, A.C.), international member of ISSF.

United States (USA)

- A Girl and A Gun Women's Shooting League (AG & AG)
- American Airgun Field Target Association, international member of WFTF
- American Confederation of Tactical Shooters (ACTS)
- American Rimfire Association (ARA)
- 3-Gun Nation (3GN)
- Civilian Marksmanship Program (CMP)
- DIVA Women Outdoors Worldwide (DIVA-WOW)
- Global Benchrest Association (GBA)
- Great American Defensive Pistol Association (GADPA)
- International Benchrest Shooters (IBS)
- International Defensive Pistol Association (IDPA)
- International Handgun Metallic Silhouette Association (IHMSA)
- National Collegiate Athletic Association (NCAA), see List of NCAA rifle programs
- National Field Archery Association (NFAA)
- National Muzzle Loading Rifle Association (NMLRA)
- National Rifle Association of America (NRA), international member of WA1500 and ICFRA
- National Shooting Sports Foundation (NSSF)
- National Skeet Shooting Association (NSSA)
- National Sporting Clays Association (NSCA)
- North-South Skirmish Association (NSSA)
- Precision Rifle Series (PRS)
- Scholastic Shooting Sports Foundation (SSSF)
- United Multigun League (UML)
- United States Army Marksmanship Unit (USAMU)
- United States Carbine Association (USCA)
- United States Metallic Silhouette Association (USMSA), international member of IMSSU.
- United States Practical Shooting Association (USPSA), international member of IPSC.
- USA Archery (USAA)
- USA Clay Target League (USACTL)
- USA Shooting, (USAS) international member of ISSF.

Puerto Rico (US)

- Puerto Rico Practical Shooting Association, international member of IPSC.
- Puerto Rico Handgun and Rifle Association (Fed. de Tiro de Armas Cortas y Rifles de Puerto R.), international member of ISSF.
- Puerto Rico Shotgun Federation (Federacion de Tiro de Puerto Rico "Escopeta"), international member of ISSF.

=== South American organizations by country ===
Argentina

- Argentine Field Target Association, international member of WFTF
- Argentina Shooting Federation (Federacion Argentina de Tiro), international member of ISSF.
- Practical Shooting Federation of Argentina, international member of IPSC.

Aruba (Kingdom of the Netherlands)

- Aruba Practical Shooters Club, international member of IPSC.
- Aruba Shooting Association, international member of ISSF.

Bolivia

- Bolivian Practical Shooting Federation, international member of IPSC.
- Bolivian Shooting Sport Federation (Federacion Boliviana de Tiro Deportivo), international member of ISSF.

Barbados

- IPSC Barbados, international member of IPSC.
- Barbados Shooting Council, international member of ISSF.

Brazil

- Brazilian Confederation of Practical Shooting, international member of IPSC.
- Brazilian Shooting Sport Confederation (Confederação Brasileira de Tiro Esportivo), international member of ISSF.

Cayman Islands (UK)

- IPSC Cayman Islands, international member of IPSC.
- Cayman Islands Sport Shooting Association (CISSA), international member of ISSF.

Colombia

- Colombian Association of Practical Shooting, international member of IPSC.
- Colombian Sport Shooting Federation (Federacion Colombiana de Tiro y Caza Deportiva), international member of ISSF.

Curaçao (Kingdom of the Netherlands)

- Curaçao Practical Shooters Club, international member of IPSC.

Cuba

- Cuban Shooting Federation (Federacion Cubana de Tiro), international member of ISSF.

Chile

- IPSC Chile, international member of IPSC.
- Chilean Clay Shooting Federation (Federacion de Tiro al Vuelo de Chile), international member of ISSF.
- Chile Shooting Sports Federation (Federacion Deportiva Nacional de Tiro – al Blanco de Chile), international member of ISSF.

Costa Rica

- Practical Shooting Association of Costa Rica, international member of IPSC.
- Costa Rican Shooting Federation (Federación de Tiro Costa Rica, FECOTIR), international member of ISSF.

Peru

- IPSC Peru, international member of IPSC.
- Peruvian National Sport Shooting Federation (Federacion Deportiva Nacional de Tiro Peruana), international member of ISSF.

Venezuela

- Practical Shooting Federation of Venezuela, international member of IPSC.
- Venezuelan Shooting Federation (Federacion Venezolana de Tiro, FEVETI), international member of ISSF.

Ecuador

- IPSC Ecuador, international member of IPSC.
- Ecuadorian Olympic Shooting Federation (Federacion Ecuatoriana de Tiro Olimpico), international member of ISSF.

Guatemala

- IPSC Guatemala, international member of IPSC.
- Guatemalan National Association of Shooting and Hunting (Asociacion Deportiva Nacional de Tiro con Armas – de Caza Guatemala), international member of ISSF.
- Guatemalan Shooting Federation (Federacion Nacional de Tiro de Guatemala), international member of ISSF.

Dominican Republic

- Dominican Republic Shooting Federation, international member of ISSF.
- Dominican Republic Clay Target Shooting Federation (Federacion Dominicana de Tiro al Plato), international member of ISSF.

Honduras

- Honduran Association Practical Shooting, international member of IPSC.
- National Shooting Federation of Honduras (Federacion Nacional de Tiro de Honduras), international member of ISSF.

Paraguay

- Paraguay Practical Shooting Association, international member of IPSC.
- Paraguayan Shooting Federation (Federacion Paraguaya de Tiro), international member of ISSF.

Nicaragua

- IPSC Nicaragua, international member of IPSC.
- National Sports Shooting Federation of Nicaragua (Federacion Nacional de Tiro Deportivo de Nicaragua, FENATIRO), international member of ISSF.

El Salvador

- El Salvador Practical Shooting Association, international member of IPSC.
- El Salvadoran Shooting Federation (Federacion Salvadorena de Tiro), international member of ISSF.

Panama

- Practical Shooting Association of Panama, international member of IPSC.
- Panamanian Shooting Federation (Federacion Panamena de Tiro), international member of ISSF.

Uruguay

- IPSC Uruguay, international member of IPSC.
- Shooting Federation Uruguaya (Federacion Uruguaya de Tiro), international member of ISSF.

Jamaica

- Jamaica Rifle Association, international member of IPSC, ISSF, WAF.

Trinidad and Tobago

- Trinidad Rifle Association, international member of IPSC, ISSF. National member of National Rifle Association (United Kingdom), Commonwealth Games Federation.

Guyana

- Guyana Sport Shooting Federation, international member of WAF, SCSA, ATA
- Guyana National Rifle Association, international member of ISSF.

Suriname

- IPSC Suriname, international member of IPSC.
- Surinam Shooting Federation (SSF), international member of ISSF.

Saint Lucia

- Saint Lucia Shooting Association, international member of IPSC, ISSF.

United States Virgin Islands (US)

- Virgin Islands Shooting Sports Federation, international member of ISSF.

Grenada

- Grenada Gun and Rifle Association (GGRA)

Antigua and Barbuda

- Antigua and Barbuda Shooting Club

== Oceania ==
The Oceania region.

=== Oceanian bodies ===
- Oceania Shooting Federation (OSF), international member of ISSF.

=== Oceania organizations by country ===
Australia

- IPSC Australia Inc, international member of IPSC.
- Sporting Shooters Association of Australia
- Federation of Hunting Clubs
- Shooting Australia, international member of ISSF, IMSSU, IPC. National member of ASC, AOC, ACGA, APC, CSF.
  - Australian Clay Target Association
  - Field and Game Australia
  - National Rifle Association of Australia (NRAA), international member of ICFRA.
  - Pistol Australia
  - Target Rifle Australia
  - NSW Shooting Association

Fiji

- The Shooting Association of Fiji, international member of ISSF.

Guam

- Guam Shooting Sports Federation, international member of IPSC.
- Guam National Sport Shooting Federation, international member of ISSF.

New Zealand

- New Zealand Airgun Field Target Association, international member of WFTF.
- New Zealand Antique and Historical Arms Association
- New Zealand Black Powder Shooters Federation
- New Zealand Deer Stalkers Association
- New Zealand Service Rifle Association
- New Zealand Shooting Federation, international member of ISSF.
  - National Rifle Association of New Zealand, international member of ICFRA.
  - New Zealand Clay Target Association
  - Pistol New Zealand, international member of IPSC.
  - Target Shooting New Zealand, Smallbore and Air Rifle.

Papua New Guinea

- Papua New Guinea Practical Shooting Association, international member of IPSC.
- Shooting Association of Papua New Guinea, international member of ISSF.

Samoa

- Samoa Shooting Association, international member of ISSF.

Tonga

- Shooting Association of Tonga (SAT), international member of ISSF.

== See also ==
- Shooting sport
- International Ammunition Association
