= French Shooting Federation =

- Fédération Française de Tir
- Abbreviation: FFTir
- Formation: 1967
- Headquarters: 38, rue Brunel, 75017 Paris
- President: Philippe Crochard
- Parent organization: IOC, IPC, ISSF, IPSC, WBSF, IMSSU, MLAIC, ICU, ESC.
- Website: fftir.org

The French Shooting Federation (FFTir), French Fédération Française de Tir, is the umbrella organization for sport shooting in France. It was founded in its current form in 1967, but has roots as far back as 1866.

FFTir is France's representative for the international shooting organizations International Shooting Sport Federation, International Practical Shooting Confederation, World Benchrest Shooting Federation, International Metallic Silhouette Shooting Union, Muzzle Loaders Associations International Committee, International Crossbow Shooting Union and the European Shooting Confederation.

== Shooting disciplines ==
- Pistol (Pistolet)
- Rifle (Carabine)
- Service firearms (Tir aux Armes Règlementaires)
- Running target (Cible Mobile)
- Shotgun (Plateau)
- Practical (Tir Sportif de Vitesse)
- Benchrest (Bench-Rest)
- Metallic silhouette (Silhouettes métalliques)
- Crossbow (Arbalète Match et Field)
- Muzzleloading (Armes anciennes)

=== Service firearms ===
Tir aux Armes Règlementaires (French for Service firearm competitions) are national French factory firearm shooting disciplines where one can participate with handguns and rifles used by the different country's military forces and civilian versions of these. All the shooting programs consists of both one part precision and one part rapid fire, and are made to have low complexity for beginners. Competitions are arranged in collaboration between the French Shooting Federation and the two reserve officers associations Union Nationale des Officiers de Réserve and Fédération Nationale des Associations de Sous-Officiers de Réserve.

- Pistol and revolver (pistolet et revolver), fired one-handed at the C-50 target at 25 meters.
- Rapid military pistol (vitesse militaire), fired two-handed at the Rapid Fire target at 25 meters.
- .22 caliber rifle (carabine 22LR), fired prone and standing at the C50-target at 50 meters.

All the programs for large caliber rifles are shot prone at the C200-target at 200 meters:

- Repeating rifle (fusil à répetition), unmodified manually operated rifles in calibers such as 7.5×54mm French, 7.5×55mm Swiss, etc.
- Modified repeating rifle (fusil modifie).
- Self-loading rifle, intermediate caliber (fusil semi automatique petit calibre) in calibres such as .223 Remington, 5.45×39mm, etc.
- Self-loading rifle, battle rifle caliber (fusil semi automatique gros calibre) in calibres such as 7.62×39mm, 7.62×51mm NATO, etc.

== Championships ==
- The IPSC French Handgun, Rifle and Shotgun Championships.

== See also ==
- List of shooting sports organizations
- Fédération Internationale de Tir aux Armes Sportives de Chasse (FITASC), another shooting sport organization based in France

=== Other umbrella organizations for shooting ===
- Association of Maltese Arms Collectors and Shooters
- Finnish Shooting Sport Federation
- Hellenic Shooting Federation
- Monaco Shooting Federation
- Norwegian Shooting Association
- Royal Spanish Olympic Shooting Federation
- Swiss Shooting Sport Federation
