= World Forum on Shooting Activities =

The World Forum on Shooting Activities (WFSA) is an association of several national and international associations for shooters, hunters and arms collectors, as well as various arms trading and industry groups. WFSA is one of the few recognized non-governmental organizations to be invited to speak at all five United Nations Small Arms Conferences. The main objective of the association is to support scientific studies, preservation, promotion and protection of shooting related activities on all continents.

== History ==
In 1996 at the IWA & OutdoorClassics in Nuremberg, several hunting and shooting associations, manufacturers of hunting and sporting firearms, firearm rights organizations and dealer organizations met and founded WFSA as an umbrella association. The WFSA has become the international arms lobby for privately held firearms, and has over 100 million members in affiliated organizations.

Since 2001 WFSA has, together with the International Action Network on Small Arms (IANSA), been invited to speak at all UN Small Arms Conferences, and participates in national and international preparations (PrepCom) for the upcoming conferences.

Since 2002 WFSA has been a non-governmental organization with consultative status in the United Nations Economic and Social Council (ECOSOC).

The WFSA is seeking a separation of privately held firearms from the UN definitions on Small Arms and Light Weapons (SALW).

== Committees ==
WFSA consists of four sub-committees.

Legislative Committee

The Legislative Committee has been involved and contributed to all five United Nations Conferences on the Illicit Trade in Small Arms and Light Weapons. It develops solutions for the marking and identification of firearms in order to prevent illegal arms trade. It also tries to create international definitions of firearms and antique firearms, and on how to identify legal and illegal firearms separately.

Image Committee

The Image Committee is intended to convey and publicize the positive aspect of shooting, and for this reason a new ambassador for the committee is elected annually. Previous ambassadors include, amongst others, Chiara Cainero, Superintendent Colin Greenwood, Wilbur Smith, Sir Jackie Stewart, Garry Breitkreuz and Ugo Gussali Beretta.

Environment Committee

The Environment Committee is concerned with protection of the environment, the conservation of biodiversity, the study of the consequences of shooting with lead ammunition in nature and on shooting ranges, and monitors international treaties that may affect hunting and shooting sports and biodiversity.

Statistics Committee

The Statistics Committee gathers information to counter myths and pseudo scientific facts used against hunters and shooters. They also collect data and statistics on the number of hunters and shooters, as well as statistics proving the economic advantage of hunters and shooters on society.

== Member associations ==
- Asociación Armera ("The Firearms Association", Spain)
- Association of European Manufacturers of Sporting Ammunition (AFEMS, Europe)
- Association of Maltese Arms Collectors and Shooters (AMACS, Malta)
- Associazione Nazionale Produttori Armi e Munizioni (ANPAM, "National Association of Weapons and Ammunition Manufacturers", Italy)
- Association of Military and Police Shooting (BDMP, "Association of Military and Police Shooting", Germany)
- British Shooting Sports Council (BSSC, United Kingdom)
- Bund Deutscher Sportschützen (BDS, "Federation of German Marksmen", Germany)
- Bundesverband Schießstätten (BVS, "Federal Association for Shooting Ranges", Germany)
- Canadian Institute for Legislative Action (CILA, Canada)
- Conservation Force, a Force for Wildlife Conservation (USA)
- Consorzio Armaioli Bresciani (CAB, Italy)
- Council of Licensed Firearm Owners (COLFO, New Zealand)
- Danish Arms and Armour Society (DAAS, Denmark)
- Danish Sport Shooting Association (DSSA, Denmark)
- European Association of civil commerce of weapons (AECAC, Europe)
- European Shooting Confederation (ESC, Europe)
- Federação Portuguesa de Tiro com Armas de Caça (FPTAC, Portugal)
- Federation of Associations for Hunting and Conservation of the EU (FACE, Europe)
- Finnish Arms Trade Association (Finland)
- Finnish Shooting Sport Federation (FSSF, Finland)
- Firearms Importers/Exporters Roundtable Trade Group (FAIR)
- Forum Waffenrecht (FWR, Germany)
- Foundation of European Societies of Arms Collectors (FESAC, Europe)
- German Shooting and Archery Federation (DSB, "Deutscher Schützenbund", Germany)
- Institut Européen des Armes de Chasse et de Sport (IEACS), France)
- Italian Clay Pigeon Shooting Federation (FITAV, Italy)
- Italian Dynamic Shooting Federation (FITDS, Italien)
- National Firearms Association (NFA, Canada)
- National Muzzle Loading Rifle Association (NMLRA, USA and Canada)
- National Rifle Association of America (NRA, USA)
- National Rifle Association of Norway (NRAN, Norway)
- National Shooting Sports Foundation (NSSF, USA)
- ProTell (Switzerland)
- Safari Club International (SCI, USA)
- Second Amendment Foundation (SAF, USA)
- South African Gunowners' Association (SAGA, South Africa)
- Sporting Arms Ammunition Manufacturers Association Japan (SAAMA, Japan)
- Sporting Arms and Ammunition Manufacturers' Institute (SAAMI, USA)
- Sporting Shooters' Association of Australia Inc. (SSAA, Australia)
- Swedish Forum for Hunting Shooting and Weapons (SVENSKT FORUM, "Svenskt Forum för jakt, skytte och vapenfrågor", Sweden)
- Swedish Pistol Shooting Association
- Verband der Hersteller von Jagd Sportwaffen und Munition (JSM, Germany)
- Vlaamse Schutterskonfederatie (VSK, "Flemish Shooting Federation", Belgium)
- VAPENUNIE / UNION ARMES

== Literature ==
- Denise Garcia: Small Arms & Security: New Emerging International Norms (Contemporary Security Studies). Routledge Chapman & Hall, 2006, ISBN 978-0-415-77051-4.
- Jutta Joachim, Birgit Locher: Transnational Activism in the UN and EU: A Comparative Study. Routledge Chapman & Hall, 2008, ISBN 978-0-415-44685-3.
- Rachel Stohl, Suzette Grillot: The International Arms Trade. John Wiley & Sons, 2009, ISBN 978-0-7456-4153-9.
- Wayne LaPierre: The Global War on Your Guns: Inside the UN Plan To Destroy the Bill of Rights. Thomas Nelson, 2006, ISBN 978-1-59555-041-5.
