= Hellenic Shooting Federation =

Sport shooting governing body in Greece

- Σκοπευτική Ομοσπονδία Ελλάδος
- Abbreviation: HSF
- Headquarters: Χρήστου Βουρνάζου 10-12, Athens, Greece
- Official language: Greek
- Parent organization: ISSF, IPSC, International Precision Rifle Federation, FITASC, MLAIC, IMSSU, WFTF, ESC
- Website: skoe.gr

The Hellenic Shooting Federation (HSF; Greek: Σκοπευτική Ομοσπονδία Ελλάδος, romanized: Skopeftikí Omospondía Elládos) is an umbrella organization for sport shooting in Greece.

HSF is Greece's representative for the international shooting organizations International Shooting Sport Federation (ISSF), International Practical Shooting Confederation (IPSC), Fédération Internationale de Tir aux Armes Sportives de Chasse (FITASC), Muzzle Loaders Associations International Committee (MLAIC), International Metallic Silhouette Shooting Union (IMSSU), World Field Target Federation (WFTF) and the European Shooting Confederation (ESC).

== See also ==
- List of shooting sports organizations

=== Other umbrella organizations for shooting ===
- Association of Maltese Arms Collectors and Shooters
- French Shooting Federation
- Finnish Shooting Sport Federation
- Monaco Shooting Federation
- Norwegian Shooting Association
- Royal Spanish Olympic Shooting Federation
- Swiss Shooting Sport Federation
