= Royal Spanish Olympic Shooting Federation =

Spanish Olympic Shooting Federation
- Real Federación Española de Tiro Olímpico
- Abbreviation: RFETO
- Parent organization: ISSF, IPSC, MLAIC, WBSF, ICFRA

The Royal Spanish Olympic Shooting Federation, Spanish Real Federación Española de Tiro Olímpico (RFETO), organizes all shooting sports in Spain and is amongst other a member of the International Practical Shooting Confederation (IPSC), the International Shooting Sport Federation (ISSF) and the European Shooting Confederation (ESC).

== Shooting disciplines ==
- Pistol
- Rifle
- Shotgun
- Practical
- Muzzleloading
- Benchrest shooting
- Fullbore target rifle

== National championships ==
- The IPSC Spanish Handgun Championships

== See also ==
- List of shooting sports organizations

=== Other umbrella organizations for shooting ===
- Association of Maltese Arms Collectors and Shooters
- French Shooting Federation
- Finnish Shooting Sport Federation
- Hellenic Shooting Federation
- Monaco Shooting Federation
- Norwegian Shooting Association
- Swiss Shooting Sport Federation
