= Finnish Shooting Sport Federation =

Finnish sports governing body

The Finnish Shooting Sport Federation
- Suomen Ampumaurheiluliitto
- Abbreviation: SAL
- Formation: 19 January 1919
- Executive Director: Risto Aarrekivi
- Parent organization: IOC, IPC, ISSF, IPSC, IMSSU, WBSF, MLAIC, ESC
- Website: ampumaurheiluliitto.fi

The Finnish Shooting Sport Federation, Finnish Suomen Ampumaurheiluliitto (SAL), was founded in 1919 and is an umbrella organization for sport shooting in Finland, representing many international shooting sport organizations in Finland.

SAL is Finlands's representative for the international shooting organizations International Shooting Sport Federation, International Practical Shooting Confederation, World Benchrest Shooting Federation, International Metallic Silhouette Shooting Union, Muzzle Loaders Associations International Committee and the European Shooting Confederation.

== Shooting disciplines ==
- Pistol (pistooli)
- Rifle (kivääri)
- Shotgun (haulikko)
- Running target (liikkuva maali)
- Practical (practical)
- Metallic silhouette (siluetti)
- Benchrest (kasa-ammunta)
- Black powder (mustaruuti)

== National championships ==
- The IPSC Finnish Handgun Championship, Rifle Championship, Shotgun Championship, Tournament Championship and Action Air Championship

== See also ==
- List of shooting sports organizations
- Nordic Shooting Region
- SRA-shooting, a shooting discipline organized by the Finnish Reservist Sports Federation.

=== Other umbrella organizations for shooting ===
- Association of Maltese Arms Collectors and Shooters
- French Shooting Federation
- Hellenic Shooting Federation
- Monaco Shooting Federation
- Norwegian Shooting Association
- Royal Spanish Olympic Shooting Federation
- Swiss Shooting Sport Federation
