= Historical Breechloading Smallarms Association =

The Historical Breechloading Smallarms Association
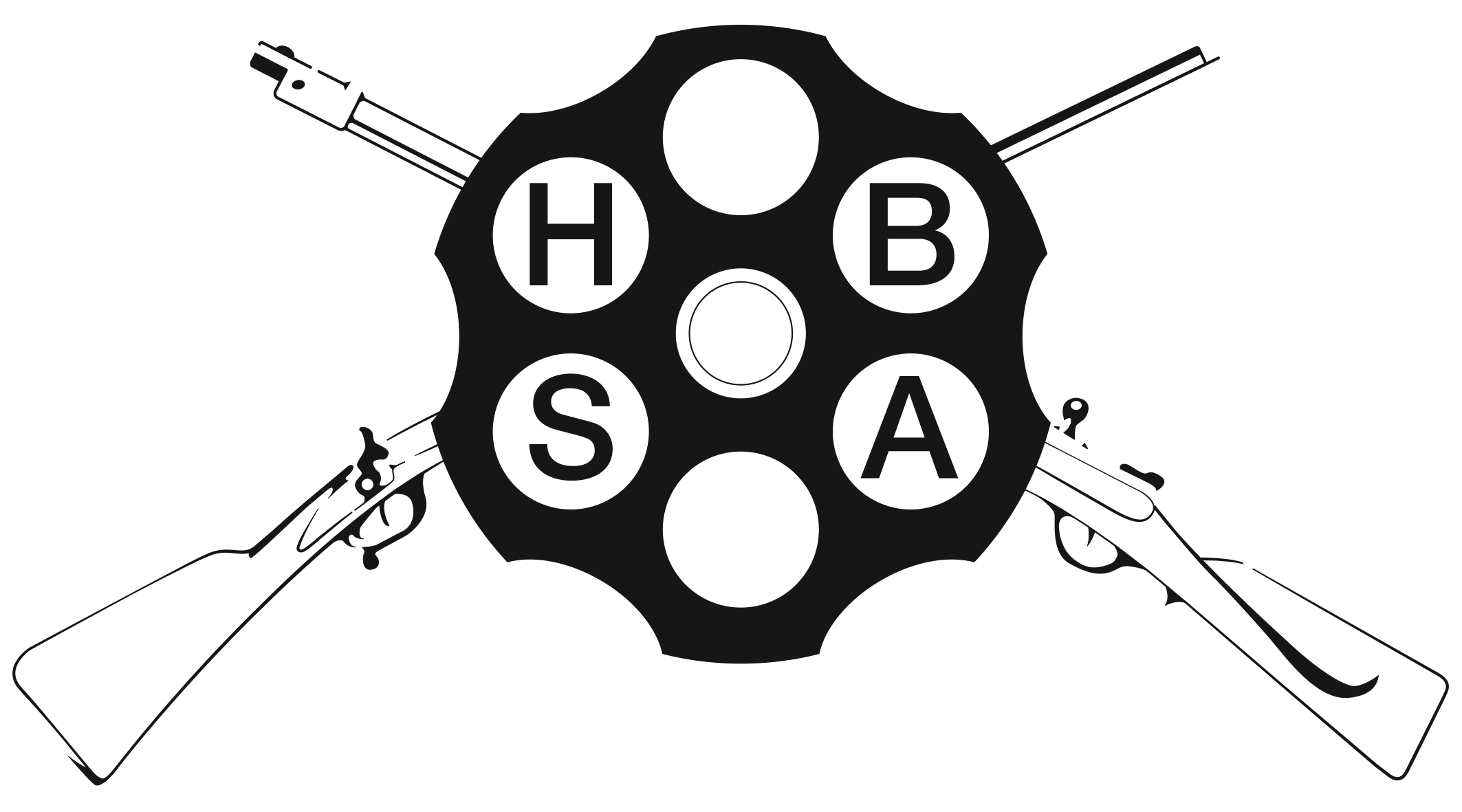
- Abbreviation: HBSA
- Formation: 1973
- Christopher Roads: President
- Website: www.hbsa-uk.org

The Historical Breechloading Smallarms Association (HBSA) is a learned society supporting the collecting of historic arms and preservation of their heritage within the UK. The HBSA also encourages research and study of historic breech-loading firearms and offers advice on the drafting of UK firearms legislation, particularly where this affects historic arms.

== See also ==
- Breechloader
- List of shooting sports organizations
- MLAGB
