= Tiradores =

Tiradores is Spanish for shooters/sharpshooters and can refer to any of the following:

- Tiradores de Ifni - a Spanish colonial army unit in Morocco,
- IPSC Peru - the Peruvian association for practical shooting commonly called the tiradores in Peru,
- Luna Sharpshooters also known as the "Marksmen of Death" (Spanish "Tiradores de la Muerte"), was a unit in the Philippine Revolutionary Army,
- Light Reaction Regiment is the premier counter-terrorist unit of the Philippine Army and the Special Mission Unit of the Philippines who is also called the "Tiradores de la Muerte".

== See also ==
- Tirailleur, the French equivalent
