= Guyana Sport Shooting Federation =

Guyana Sport Shooting: Promotes shooting sports

- Parent organization: National Sports Commission - Guyana, World Archery Federation, Steel Challenge Shooting Association, Amateur Trapshooting Association
- Website: www.guyanasportshooting.com

The Guyana Sport Shooting Federation (GSSF) is a Guyanese organization involved in the promotion of several aspects of sport shooting in Guyana, being a member of the following international organizations:

- World Archery Federation
- Steel Challenge Shooting Association
- Amateur Trapshooting Association

== See also ==
Guyana National Rifle Association
