= South African Shooting Sport Confederation =

South African union for sport shooting

- Sport: Shooting
- Jurisdiction: South Africa
- Abbreviation: SASSCo
- Affiliation: ISSF
- Regional affiliation: African Shooting Sport Federation (ASSF)
- Headquarters: Sedibeng
- Location: 17 Caledon Rivier Street, SE 4, Vanderbijlpark 1911
- President: Bennie van den Heever
- Secretary: Dave Wilson

Official website
- www.sassf.co.za
- (South Africa)

South African Shooting Sport Confederation (SASSCo) formerly known as South African Shooting Sport Federation (SASSF) is the governing body for shooting sports in South Africa. SASSCo is the highest body responsible for the development and promotion of target shooting sports in South Africa. SASSCo is registered with both SASCOC and Sport and Recreation South Africa (SRSA) as the officially recognised overall federation for shooting sports in South Africa, and is also affiliated to the International Shooting Sport Federation (ISSF) and the African Shooting Sport Federation (ASSF).

== History ==
The South African Shooters Union (SASU) was established in the 1990s as a result of the need for only one representative federation governing each sporting activity in South Africa as required by government's policy. The International Shooting Sport Federation (ISSF), the world governing body for shooting sports subsequently suggested a name change to South African Shooting Sport Federation (SASSF).

SASSF's (now South African Shooting Sport Confederation (SASSCo)) affiliate member associations compete in International Olympic Committee (IOC) events in addition to non-IOC sanctioned events. SASSF holds the international affiliation from ISSF on behalf of the Olympic events-member associations while the non-Olympic events-member associations competing in international competitions hold the international affiliation for those events.

== Affiliates ==
This is a list of affiliates of SASSCo.

- Confederation of Hunters Associations of SA Sport - CHASA
- COMPAK South Africa - COMPAK SA
- Clay Target Shooting Association of South Africa - CTSASA
- Lowveld Sport Shooting Association - LSSA
- South African Air Rifle Association - SAARA
- South African Benchrest Shooting Federation - SABSF
- South African Bisley Union - SABU
- South African Combat Rifle Association - SACRA
- South African Field Target Airgun Association - SAFTAA
- South African Hunting Rifle Association - SAHRA
- SA Hunters and Game Conservation Association - SAJWV/SAHGCA
- South African Metallic Silhouette Shooting Association - SAMSSA
- SA Pistol Association - SAPA
- South African Paintball Association - SAPBA
- South African Practical Shooting Association - SAPSA
- South African Pin Shooting Federation - SAPSF
- South African Precision Shooting Federation - SAPSSF
- South African Target Rifle Association - SATRA

Affiliates and sport shooting clubs help in the promotion and development of the various codes and disciplines of sport shooting among all enthusiasts across various age and gender groups in South Africa with tournaments being held to boost the popularity of the sport. Sport shooting is a small but growing sport in South Africa with schools also investing in facilities and coaching.

== See also ==
- Sports in South Africa
- List of shooting sports organizations
