= Precision pistol competition =

Precision Pistol Competition (PPC), originally and still known as Police Pistol Combat in North America, is a shooting sport focusing on precision shooting from a variety of stances (standing, kneeling, sitting and prone) at varying distances (3, 7, 15, 25 and 50 meters or yards), including shooting from behind an obstacle. The competition seeks to create a measure of similarity to real world situations and is considered one of the forerunners of practical shooting. World Association PPC 1500 (WA1500) is the international governing body of PPC.

The competition format was founded in the U.S. between 1957 and 1958 and was intended to help police officers improve their firearms skills in the line of duty. Originally this was a revolver-specific competition because most police officers carried this type of sidearm, but was later expanded to include autoloading pistols. Through the years the discipline has been known by various names such as "Police Pistol Combat", "Practical Police Course", "Practical Pistol Course" and "Practical Pistol Combat", but "Precision Pistol Competition" is the official name used today by WA1500, the international sanctioning body. The sport has become popular in the United States, Sweden, Germany, Norway and Canada, and official matches are no longer restricted to police officers or military personnel.

PPC is often associated with a particular style of a revolver having a heavy barrel and a prominent sight rib. This is not the only type of firearm used in PPC competition, but some manufacturers used PPC as part of the model name for such guns and the name stuck.

== See also ==
- List of shooting sports organizations
