= World Fast Draw Association =

- Jurisdiction: International
- Abbreviation: WFDA
- Founded: 1976

Official website
- fastdraw.org

The World Fast Draw Association (WFDA) is the largest international sanctioning body in the shooting sport of fast draw, with active members in the United States, Canada, Japan, Korea, the United Kingdom and Germany. In addition to keeping records and presenting awards, the Association publishes a monthly magazine detailing the sport. The organization is associated with the National Rifle Association of America.

== See also ==
- List of shooting sports organizations
