= Japan Rifle Shooting Sport Federation =

Governing body

- Sport: ISSF Shooting Sports
- Jurisdiction: Japan
- Abbreviation: JRSSF, NRAJ
- Founded: 1971
- Affiliation: ISSF
- Regional affiliation: ASC
- Headquarters: Shinjuku-ku, Japan
- President: Kiichiro Matsumaru
- Chairman: Kiichiro Matsumaru
- Secretary: Mr. Wataru Fujii

Official website
- www.riflesports.jp
- (Japan)

The Japan Rifle Shooting Sport Federation (Japanese: 公益社団法人日本ライフル射撃協会, JRSSF ) is the governing body for rifle, pistol and laser shooting in Japan. The federation represents rifle shooting sports within the Japanese Olympic Committee and Paralympic Committee, and is a member of the International Shooting Sport Federation (ISSF) which governs Olympic shooting, as well as the International Confederation of Fullbore Rifle Associations (ICFRA). The Federation is headquartered in Shinjuku-ku, Tokyo.

== History ==
The JRSSF traces its beginnings to the Student Shooting Federation, formed in 1924 by Genzo Moroo. This developed into a national federation by 1937. The National Rifle Association of Japan was approved as an incorporated association by the Ministry of Education in 1971. The Federation has participated in the Olympics since the 1952 Olympic Games in Helsinki.

In addition to forming regional associations around Japan, the Federation supports several partner bodies including the Student Rifle Shooting Federation, the Japan Sports Shooting Federation for the Disabled, the Japan Muzzle Loader Shooting Federation, and the Masters Rifle Shooting Association of Japan.

The Federation's headquarters moved from Shibuya-ku, Tokyo to Shinjuku-ku in July 2019.

Ahead of the 2020 Olympic Games in Tokyo, the Federation supported the organisation of shooting events at the Games and was involved in negotiations with authorities to grant exemptions from the strict firearms laws in Japan. In particular to allow coaches and match officials to touch firearms when coaching competitors or conducting equipment control.

Ahead of the Games, the Federation also enlisted the voice cast of the Rifle Is Beautiful manga series as PR ambassadors for the shooting sports.

== Olympic Medals ==
Japan has won six Olympic medals in shooting events, most recently in 1992. Five are attributed to the Federation in rifle or pistol events.

- 1992 - Kazumi Watanabe Silver, trap
- 1992 - Ryohei Koba Bronze, rifle three positions
- 1988 - Tomoko Hasegawa Silver, 25 metre pistol
- 1984 - Takeo Kamachi Gold, 25m rapid fire pistol
- 1964 - Yoshihisa Yoshikawa Bronze, 50metre pistol
- 1960 - Yoshihisa Yoshikawa Bronze, 50metre pistol

== Presidents ==
- Genzo Moroo
- Minoru Anzai
- Goji Sakamoto -2017
- Kiichiro Matsumaru 2017-

== See also ==
- Japan Clay Target Shooting Association
