= IPSC Kyrgyzstan =

- Parent organization: International Practical Shooting Confederation

IPSC Kyrgyzstan is the Kyrgyz association for practical shooting under the International Practical Shooting Confederation. They arrange handgun, action air, and rifle matches in Kyrgyzstan. The organization has also supported precision rifle competitions based on T-Class rules. In 2021, Kyrgyzstan was accepted as a full member of the IPSC.
