= Philippine National Shooting Association =

- Sport: Shooting
- Abbreviation: PNSA
- Headquarters: Rm. 303, Bldg. B, PhilSports Complex, Pasig, Metro Manila
- President: Chavit Singson
- (Philippines)

The Philippine National Shooting Association (PNSA) is the National Sports Association (NSA) governing shooting sports in the Philippines, covering both Olympic discipline shooting sports and non-Olympic shooting events like the bench rest or practical pistol. PNSA is the Philippine shooting sport NSA recognized by and a regular member of the Philippine Olympic Committee (POC), funded by the Philippine Sports Commission (PSC).

The PNSA is an accredited member of the International Shooting Sport Federation (ISSF), the governing body of international shooting sports, headquartered in Germany. The Philippine National Shooting Association is also an accredited member of the Asian Shooting Confederation (ASC) and Asian Clay Shooting Federation.

The Philippine National Shooting Association (PNSA) is a non-stock, non-profit organization of Philippine shooting sport enthusiasts and athletes.

== Special recognition ==
In the last quarter of 2007, PNSA signed a memorandum of agreement with PhilSPADA - the Philippine Sports Association of Differently Abled - National Paralympic Committee, to provide assistance and support in the development of target shooting for athletes with a physical impairment. Just like their able-bodied counterparts, Paralympic shooters use the same guns, clothing and equipment, with a few modifications like shooting tables and chairs.

International Paralympic Committee Shooting (IPC Shooting) uses a classification system to determine events shooters with impairments may compete in as well as rules adapted from the International Shooting Sport Federation (ISSF).

== Facilities ==
The PNSA-PSC Shooting Ranges for 10 meter, 25 meter and 50 meter events are located in the Marines area of Fort Bonifacio, Taguig City while the PNSA Clay Target Range for Trap and Skeet events is in Muntinlupa. During the 2005 Southeast Asian Games, the ranges were used as the shooting competition venues. All PNSA-PSC Shooting Ranges are only open for use to members.

In mid-2012 the first electronic target system was installed on 10 firing points in the 10 meter Air Shooting Range. Shot locations recorded by target sensors show up on the monitors of National Training Pool shooters giving instant shot feedback. This increases accuracy to match performance of contemporaries using similar electronic target facilities abroad. The ISSF 2013-2016 Rule Changes require decimal scoring to replace whole number scoring.

== Competition process ==
Both youth and adult shooters compete locally in the yearly National Open, a series of monthly shooting events. The top performing shooters are chosen for the National Training Pool which receives support like ammunition, an allowance or both. This is followed by monthly competitions, where shooters strive to achieve their event's Minimum Qualification Scores (MQS), currently pegged as the bronze score from the last Asian Games for selection to compete in international shooting events, starting with regional level events leading up to the Olympic Games.

Financed by the Philippine Sports Commission, the Philippine National Shooting Association selects and sends consistently-performing elite Filipino shooters who have passed their event MQS to regional multisport events like the Southeast Asian Games, Asian Games, Asian Youth Games and other shooting competitions. Shooters who achieve their event MQS in the World Cups, World Championships, and Continental Championships, are sent on to the Olympic Games following requirements detailed in the Olympic qualification process.

== 2013 - 2014 Competitions (with PHI Shooting entries) ==
=== 2013 ===
JULY
Singapore Open Shooting Championship, (10 Jul - 17 Jul 2013) - Singapore
Junior Air Rifle and Air Pistol
AUGUST
2nd Asian Youth Games (16th - 24th Aug, 2013) - Nanjing, CHINA
Junior Air Rifle and Air Pistol
NOVEMBER
2013 Southeast Asian Shooting Association Championships (SEASA) - Kuala Lumpur, Malaysia
All shooting disciplines
The 2013 SEASA which was originally to be hosted in Manila in May has been moved to November to KL, Malaysia. The event will be jointly organized by PNSA and Malaysian counterparts.
DECEMBER
2013 Southeast Asian Games - Naypyidaw, Myanmar
.22 Rifle and Pistol events

=== 2014 ===
SEPTEMBER
2014 Asian Games, (Sept 19 to Oct 4, 2014) - Incheon, Korea

== See also ==
- ISSF shooting events
- ISSF World Shooting Championships
- Shooting at the Summer Olympics
