= North-South Skirmish Association =

Organization

The North-South Skirmish Association (N-SSA) is a historical and competitive organization whose goal is to maintain the knowledge of the unique firearms used during the American Civil War. Formed in 1950 to commemorate the men who fought on both sides during the war, the association is based mainly in the eastern United States, and there are related associations in the western United States

The N-SSA is headquartered in Winchester, Virginia, and has skirmish locations all over the eastern United States, with a heavy preponderance of activities in the Midwest and Northeastern United States.

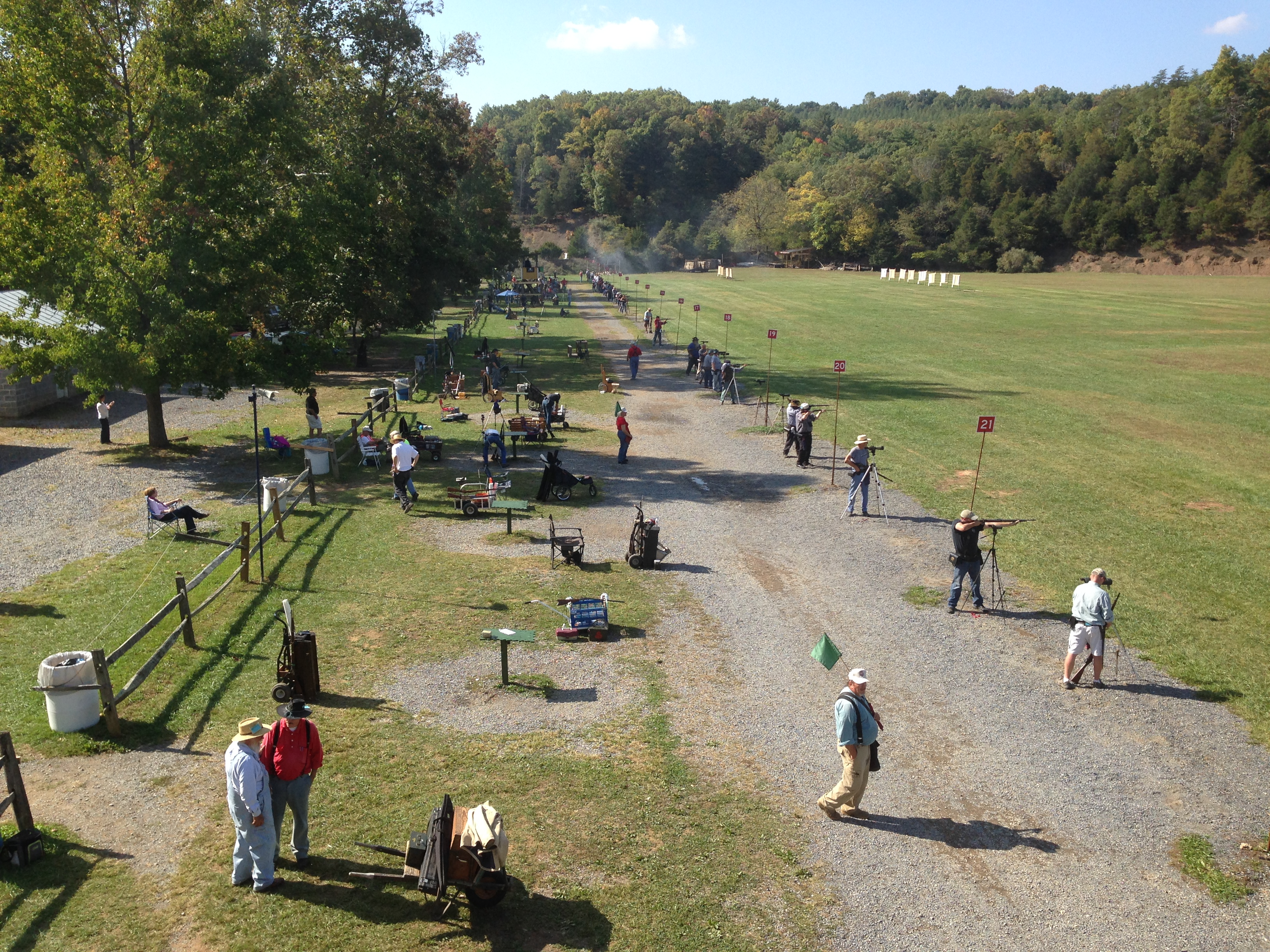
A shot from the weekday matches at the N-SSA Fall Nationals 2014

== Organization ==
N-SSA matches, known as Skirmishes, are not re-enactments of specific Civil War battles. Rather, the N-SSA is concerned with promoting the accurate shooting of the firearms of the era. Matches are devoted to authentic firearms accuracy, with a secondary, but still important, devotion to historical accuracy in uniforms and equipment.

Unlike most American Civil War reenactments, skirmish events are composed of individuals and teams that fire live ammunition at paper and breakable targets. Competitors can shoot firearms that are either original (e.g., date from 1861 to 1865) or are N-SSA-approved reproductions of firearms issued to soldiers from that period. Individual events are usually composed of paper bullseye targets at varying ranges, with five or ten shots for score.

The core of N-SSA shooting is the 8-man musket team match. Uniformed Union and Confederate teams compete in timed, rapid-fire events, shooting at breakable targets such as clay pigeons, ceramic tiles, and clay flower pots at ranges of 50 and 100 yards (91 m). The team with the lowest time wins.

The N-SSA is a team-based organization rather than individual-based; one belongs to a team first and then to the larger N-SSA organization, but it is the N-SSA which issues membership cards to individual competitors.

Teams are grouped into thirteen Regions. Each Region has roughly ten to fifteen teams, and is responsible for holding a Regional Championship at least annually. Geographically, many of the Regions overlap each other, as the N-SSA organizes new Regions to accommodate the creation of new teams.

== History ==
In 1949, John L. Rawls ran across an article describing Ernest W. Peterkin's avid interest in Civil War-era muskets. The two exchanged letters, and agreed to plan a Civil War display at a local gun club.

On May 28, 1950, Rawls and Peterkin were invited to meet and put on a display of Civil War weaponry, uniforms, and equipment at the Berwin Rod and Gun Club in Muirkirk, Maryland. Rawls arrived with seven men, the "Norfolk Long Rifles", dressed in period Confederate infantry uniforms. Peterkin and his five "Berwyn Blue Bellies" were dressed in period Union infantry uniforms. At the scheduled hour these men fired at individual targets, and participated in a team event that used balloons as targets. The Norfolk Long Rifles won the match. This event has come to be known as the "First Skirmish".

Two men from another gun club, the Cavalier Rifle and Pistol Club of Richmond, Virginia, witnessed this match, and were very impressed. They convinced the club to invite the two teams to their range for a rematch. Rawls and Peterkin were eager to accept this invitation to this second "skirmish".

The second skirmish witnessed the appearance of the first artillery. A mountain howitzer owned by the Confederates opened the event with a shot, and later fired three rounds for exhibition. The two teams also changed their names at this event, the Blue Bellies being renamed the Washington Blue Rifles, and the Long Rifles changed their name to the 1st Virginia Greys.

Events at the second skirmish included an exploding cardboard fort, moving silhouettes, and more balloons. The crude scoring system gave the match win to the Virginia Greys, who were awarded blue ribbons and medals. One of the Blue Rifles, William B. Poland, won the individual event.

The third skirmish was held at Camp Pendleton (Virginia) in July 1951. Rawls and Peterkin held this event in conjunction with the last reunion of United Confederate Veterans, which was attended by "General" John Salling of Slant, Virginia, and two other veterans. A parade was marched down the streets of Norfolk in blistering heat. Joining the Virginia Greys and Blue Rifles were two new teams, the 1st Richmond Rifles, and the Huron Rangers Riflemen who traveled 800 miles (1,300 km) from Detroit, MI to participate.

These events, and the ones that followed, built the framework for the North-South Skirmish Association as it is today.

=== Other Notable Events ===
October 1956 - Formal adoption of a Constitution & By-Laws, First National Commander Elected.

July 1958 - Incorporation of the association is completed.

January 1961 - Timed scoring system adopted.

July 1961 - 1st Manassas Reenactment, first of many U.S. Civil War Centennial Events, heavily attended and hosted by N-SSA member units.

September 1963 - 28th National, First National Skirmish Held at Fort Shenandoah.

May 2012 - The 125th Nationals Held at Fort Shenandoah, Tom Shedd and Joseph A. Sansone, Jr. Co-Skirmish Directors.

== Competition arms ==
Firearms used in N-SSA competition are restricted to those types documented to have been purchased by or issued to Federal or Confederate forces during the American Civil War. For an arm to qualify, there must be documentation supporting its issue to at least 100 troops, either in a regular branch of the military or in a state militia. Arms may be either original or replica. Arms not on the Approved Arms List require individual approval by the Small Arms Committee. Limited modifications may be made to firearms to improve performance. Triggers and locks may be tuned, sight heights may be changed, and barrels may be bedded. However, the general external profile and dimensions of arms must closely match those of original Civil War small arms.

Six major types of small arms are used in N-SSA competition.

=== Musket ===
The standard infantry arm of the American Civil War was the rifle-musket. These arms were muzzle-loading rifles firing the Minié ball. Major types of musket used by combatants during the Civil War were the Model 1861 and 1863 Springfield, as well as the British-made Pattern 1853 and 1858 Enfield. Although the long 'three-band' muskets (so called because they had three bands fastening the barrel to the stock) were the most widely issued, many N-SSA competitors favor the shorter 'two-band' muskets due to their superior balance and heavier barrels.

As of 2015, a new event, "Traditional Musket" was added to the event list. Competitors firing in this event must use an as-issued rifle-musket, with no modifications to stocks, locks, or bedding permitted. Competitors must also wear a full period-correct uniform to fire in these matches, and utilize only period-correct projectiles and paper cartridges.

=== Carbine ===
Carbines were issued to many cavalrymen from the 17th century until the 20th century. The American Civil War was notable for the use of carbines that were of markedly different design than the standard infantry weapon. Although short-barreled versions of the issue musket were used, breech-loading designs such as the Sharps carbine and the Burnside carbine were more frequently encountered.

The N-SSA groups muzzle-loading and breech-loading carbines together for competitive purposes. There is considerable debate about which design is the best. The advocates of muzzle-loading carbines argue that their arms are more accurate than most breechloaders, while the breechloader advocates argue that the superior rate of fire makes up for any loss of accuracy.

=== Revolver ===
Revolvers were issued to cavalrymen, artillery troops, and officers during the Civil War, which was one of the first conflicts to see such arms used in quantity. N-SSA revolver competition is limited to revolvers using percussion cap ignition. The major types of revolver used were the Colt Model 1851 and 1860, and the Remington Models of 1858 and 1863.

There is also a single shot pistol competition for individual entry only (i.e. no team events).

=== Breechloading rifle ===
The American Civil War was the first conflict in which firearms using self-contained cartridges were widely used. In the mid-1990s, the N-SSA added events for such arms to the competition schedule. Breechloading Rifles, as defined in N-SSA events, include the Henry Rifle and the Spencer Repeating Rifle. This is often referred to as the repeater match, given the ability of these weapons to hold more than one cartridge in its magazine.

=== Single shot rifle ===
In addition to the repeater match listed above, the N-SSA offers a category for single-shot breech-loading weapons. Both externally primed percussion weapons (mainly the Sharps 1859 rifle and rifle versions of the Maynard) as well as internally primed cartridge guns (such as the Ballard, Frank Wesson, and so on) are used.

=== Smoothbore musket ===
Although the American Civil War is frequently thought of as a conflict fought with rifle-muskets, the older smoothbore muskets were commonly used during the first half of the war. The N-SSA instituted matches for smoothbore muskets in the 1990s. Current N-SSA rules require the use of a bare bullet, and prohibit the use of a patched round ball, as is permitted under MLAIC rules. Either flintlock or percussion cap muskets may be used in smoothbore musket competition.

=== Single shot pistol ===
Early in the American Civil War, even smoothbore pistols were used. The newest competition includes these firearms. Like musket, current N-SSA rules require the use of a bare bullet, and prohibit the use of a patched round ball, as is permitted under MLAIC rules. Either flintlock or percussion cap pistols may be used in smoothbore pistol competition. Additionally, a stand to hold the pistol during reloading is required.

== Shooting competition ==
The N-SSA holds numerous shooting competitions, known as Skirmishes, throughout the year. Skirmishes may be Invitational, sponsored by individual teams; Regional, sponsored by regions; or National, sponsored by the National organization.

National Championship skirmishes are held twice yearly at the N-SSA home range near Winchester, Virginia in the months of May and October. The eastern part of the country is broken up into regions which hold their own regional skirmishes throughout the year, generally once or twice a month during the warmer months. Skirmishes feature both individual competitions and team competitions.

=== Individual competition ===
Individual competitions are held with musket, revolver, carbine, repeater, single shot, single shot pistol, and smoothbore arms. Distances are 50 and 100 yards (91 m) with muskets, carbines, and repeaters; and 25 and 50 yards (46 m) with revolvers, single shot pistols, and smoothbore muskets.

All individual matches are slow-fire precision events fired on standard N-SSA paper targets. The dimensions of these targets correspond closely to National Rifle Association targets for rifle and pistol. Individual matches at the National and most Regional Skirmishes are 10 shots for score with unlimited sighter shots, but some Regional and Invitational

In addition to each individual match, there are several aggregate matches, including aggregates for each type of arm, as well as the Grand Aggregate of the musket, carbine, and revolver matches.

=== Team competition ===
Team competitions are rapid-fire events fired against breakable targets. Teams may fire for up to five minutes (two minutes for revolver events) in each event, and a penalty assessed for every unhit target. The total time to complete all events is a team's score, with the team having the lowest total time winning.

=== Musket team event ===
The core of the North-South Skirmish Association is the musket team match. For both National and Regional matches, this competition consists of eight members. There are usually five events, one event at a distance of 100 yards (91 m) and four at a distance of 50 yards (46 m).

At the National, 50-yard (46 m) musket team events include: 32 clay pigeons on a cardboard backer, 16 hanging 4"x4" ceramic tiles, 16 hanging clay pigeons, and 16 hanging clay flower pots. The 100-yard (91 m) musket team event at a National is 10 hanging 6"x6" ceramic tiles.

Regional musket matches are free to substitute other targets in place of the ones listed above. Other typical targets for the 50-yard (46 m) events are 12 ounce drink cans or 8 ounce styrofoam cups filled with water. Another typical target for the 100-yard (91 m) event would be 2 liter bottles filled with colored water.

=== Carbine team event ===
The second largest (next to the musket match) competition within the North-South Skirmish Association is the carbine team match. For the national matches, this competition consists of eight members, and targets are usually the same as musket team.

Regional carbine matches quite often consist of five members; this is done to increase the number of teams competing since there are a smaller number of people attending. There are usually four or five events, one event at a distance of 100 yards (91 m) and three or four at a distance of 50 yards (46 m).

=== Revolver team event ===
Revolver team events are quite popular in the N-SSA. Revolver teams consist of four shooters at the National matches, and usually three shooters at other Skirmishes.

The normal target set for the revolver team match is: 1. Three clay pigeons on a cardboard backer per shooter 2. Two hanging clay pigeons per shooter 3. Two other hanging targets (wood blocks or clay pots) per shooter

=== Breechloader, single shot, and smoothbore events ===
Among the newest events to be added to the skirmish schedule, repeater, single shot, and smoothbore events consist anywhere from 3 members (at regional demonstration events) to 4 members (at official national match events). Targets are usually similar to other matches held during a skirmish.

=== Artillery team event ===
The most distinctive competition within the North-South Skirmish Association is the artillery team match. This match is broken down into mortar, rifled, smoothbore, and howitzer artillery.

Mortar – 100-yard (91 m) range, 7 shots, fired at stake, scoring determined by distance measured to 5 closest hits to stake.

Rifled cannon – 200-yard (180 m) range, 1-hour limit, 12 shots, best 10 for score, fired at two paper targets, a bullseye, and a counter battery, scoring is determined by points system. Best score: 50-5V. Common rifled cannon included in this match are the 10-pdr Parrott, the 10-pdr ordnance rifle, and the James Rifle.

Smoothbore cannon – 200-yard (180 m) range, 1-hour limit, 12 shots, best 10 for score, fired at two paper targets, a bullseye, and a counter battery, scoring is determined by points system. Best score: 50-5V. Common smoothbore cannon include the 12-pdr Napoleon and the 6-pdr smoothbore field gun.

== Home range ==
The N-SSA's headquarters and main range, known as Fort Shenandoah, are located on approximately 430 acres (1.7 km^{2}) of land approximately seven miles north of Winchester, Virginia. Facilities include a rifle range, a separate revolver range, and private camping.

The main rifle range has a firing line over one-quarter mile (400 m) long, with room for nearly 600 competitors to shoot simultaneously. Shooting distance in this configuration is 50 and 100 yards (91 m). The width of the range is employed, with a slanted firing line, to provide distances of up to 300 yards (270 m) for artillery and long-range rifle competition. This range is controlled from a single tower, and is one of the largest in the world.

The revolver range has a firing line of approximately 250 positions. Distances available are 25 yards (23 m) for the entire line, and 50 yards (46 m) for approximately 25 positions. The full width of the revolver range is normally used only for revolver team competition.

Member units are assigned campsites for their use throughout the year. Utilities are limited to central water and toilet facilities. Most competitors and their families spend skirmish weekends on the range - a particularly enjoyable experience during the prime camping seasons of late May (Spring Nationals) and early October (Fall Nationals).

Planned activities for a typical skirmish weekend include children's programs, dances, cook-outs, and trips to "Sutler Row," where vendors display and sell Civil War firearms, accoutrements, and clothing.

== Media coverage ==
- (TV-The Nashville Network) American Shooter: "N-SSA", aired September 20, 2002.
- (TV-Outdoor Channel) Shooting USA: "North-South Skirmish Nationals", aired December 2, 2005.
- (TV-History Channel) Lock & Load with R. Lee Ermey: "Pilot", air date November 14, 2008.
