= Nepal Shooting Association =

- Official Logo of the NSA
- Sport: Shooting
- Jurisdiction: (Nepal) National
- Abbreviation: NSA
- Founded: 1980; 45 years ago
- Affiliation: ISSF
- Regional affiliation: ASC
- Headquarters: Satdobato, Lalitpur
- President: Pushpa Das Shrestha
- Secretary: Pradeep Khati

Official website
- nepalshooting.org.np
- (Nepal)

The Nepal Shooting Association (NSA) was founded in 1980 with a view to promote and popularize the shooting sports in Nepal.

Shooting used to be really popular game in during 90s period. Also, ranked first in South Asian region but due to 10 years long civil war and political instability, this game could not able to match the pace of competition between rest of the neighboring countries.

On the regular basis South Asian Sporting giant India's NRAI and NSA have conducted and meet at different locations for the promote and to organized collaborative competitions.

== Events ==
- National Men's and Women's Shooting Championship
