= International Metallic Silhouette Shooting Union =

- Sport: Metallic silhouette shooting
- Category: Shooting sport
- Jurisdiction: International
- Membership: 26 regions
- Abbreviation: IMSSU
- Founded: 1992

Official website
- imssu.org

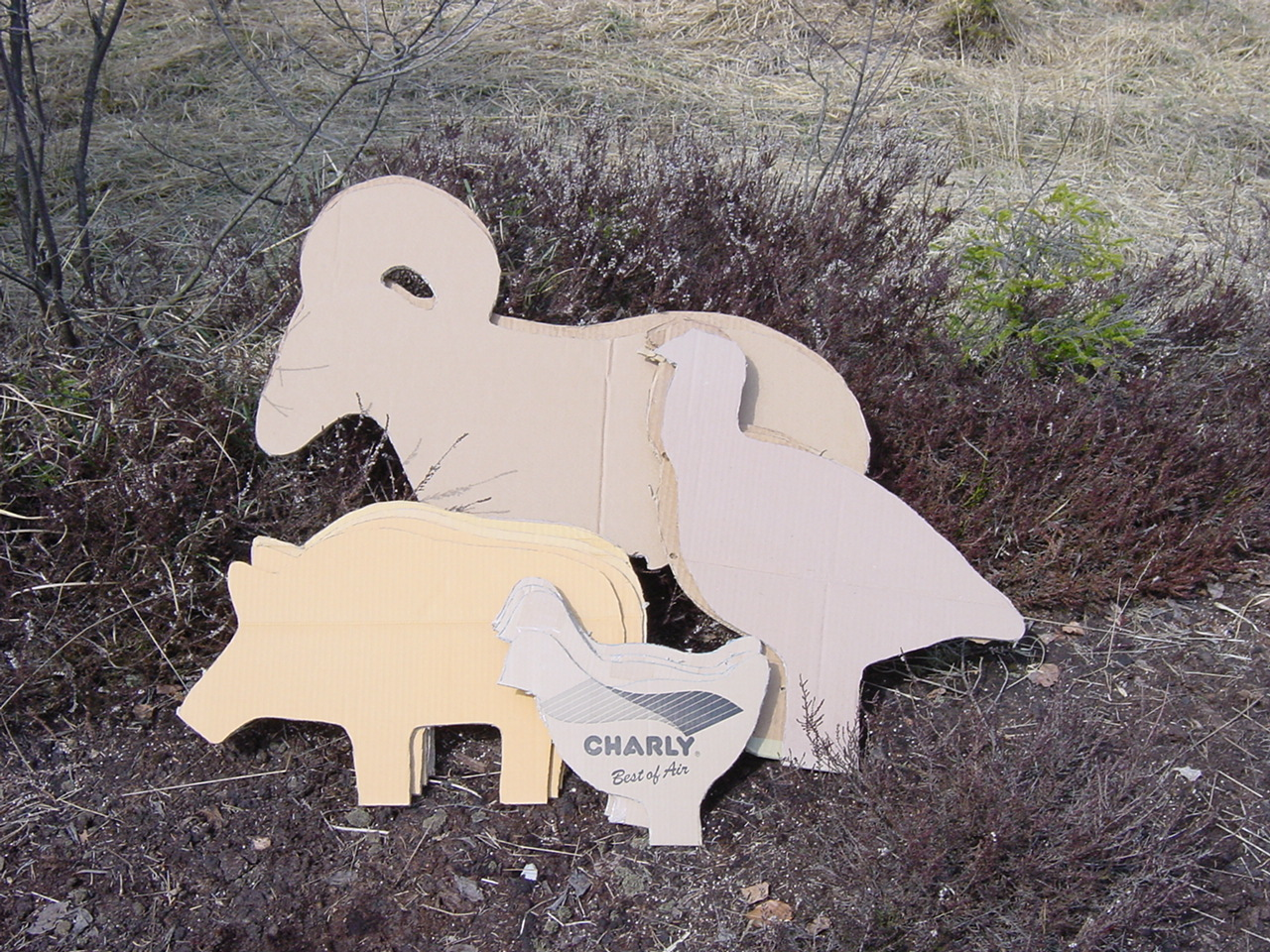
Cut cardboard targets of the same shape and sizes which are used as steel targets in metallic silhouette shooting.

The International Metallic Silhouette Shooting Union (IMSSU) is the international organization for metallic silhouette shooting, which was founded in 1992 in response to the fact that rules for metallic silhouette shooting started to diverge around the world.

The European regional body is Association Européenne de Tir sur Silhouettes Métalliques (AETSM), which means European Metallic Silhouette Shooting Association

== History ==
The International Metallic Silhouette Shooting Union was founded on 8 October 1992 in Paris, with founding members from Australia, Belgium, France, the Netherlands, New Zealand, South Africa, Switzerland, the US and the European silhouette federation AETSM. Michel Boulanger was elected as the first president along with Jean-Pierre Beurtheret as the first secretary.

It was established a competition ruleset which could only be revised every fourth year to give stability to the sport. The first IMSSU competition ruleset was largely based on the NRA metallic silhouette competition rules, but since 1997 NRA has published silhouette rules which differ from IMSSU.

== Member associations ==
As of 2020 IMSSU has 26 member regions.

Region	Name of the region
Australia	Pistol Australia (link)
Austria	Austrian Metallic Silhouette and Field Target Association (link)
Belgium	Union Royale des Sociétés de Tir de Belgique
Brazil	Brazilian Confederation of Practical Shooting
Czech Republic	Czech Metallic Silhouette Shooting Association (link)
Denmark	Danish Sport Shooting Association
Finland	Finnish Shooting Sport Federation
France	French Shooting Federation
Germany	Federation of German Marksmen
Hungary	Dynamic Shooting Sport Federation of Hungary
Ireland	National Silhouette Association Ireland
Italy	Unione Italiana Silhouette Metallica
Lithuania	Lietuvos Šaudymo Į Lauko Taikinius Asociacija
Malta	Association of Maltese Arms Collectors and Shooters
Namibia	Namibia Metallic Silhouette Shooting
Netherlands	Dutch Silhouette Shooter's Association (link)
New Zealand	Pistol New Zealand
Norway	Norwegian Metallic Silhouette Association
Philippines	Philippine Shooters Match Officers Confederation
Russia	Russian High Precision Shooting Federation
South Africa	South African Metallic Silhouette Shooting Association
Sweden	Swedish Metallic Silhouette Association (link)
Sri Lanka	International Metallic Silhouette Shooting Union of Sri Lanka
Switzerland	Swiss Metallic Silhouette Shooting Association
USA	United States Metallic Silhouette Association (USMSA), which follow NRA rules in the U.S. and IMSSU rules in the World Championships.
Zimbabwe:	Zimbabwe Sport Shooting Federation

Former regions	Name of the region
United Kingdom	

== See also ==
- List of shooting sports organizations
- International Handgun Metallic Silhouette Association (IHMSA)
