= Marianas Practical Shooting Association =

- Abbreviation: MPSA
- Predecessor: Guam Shooting Sports Federation
- Formation: 2017
- Location: Guam
- Website: islandshooters.com

The Marianas Practical Shooting Association (MPSA) is a Guamanian association for practical shooting.

== History ==
Formerly the Guam Shooting Sports Federation (GSSF) had existed since the 1970s, which held practical shooting competitions and an annual Steel Challenge speed-shooting championships on the islands.

In 2001, Guam and Micronesia were provisionally accepted as members of the IPSC, In addition to civilian sport and recreation, GSSF has also hosted matches for law enforcement officers. In 2010, GSSF worked on putting together a team to represent Guam in the Pacific Games and 2012 Olympics.

In 2016, the Marianas Practical Shooting Association (MPSA) initially formed before being formally founded in 2017, and has since represented Guam in several international practical shooting competitions. From 2017, the Marianas Practical Shooting Association took on the IPSC representation on the islands. Steel Challenge shooting on the island has since been hosted by the separate organization Guam United Alpha Marksman Club which is affiliated with Steel Challenge Shooting Association (SCSA).

== See also ==
- Philippine Practical Shooting Association
