= Association of Maltese Arms Collectors and Shooters =

- Abbreviation: AMACS
- Formation: 12 June 1985
- Parent organization: IPSC, IMSSU, WCSA, FESAC, WFTF
- Website: amacs-malta.org

The Association of Maltese Arms Collectors and Shooters (AMACS) is a Maltese umbrella association for sport shooting and arms collectors.

AMACS is Malta's representative for the international shooting organizations Federation of European Societies of Arms Collectors (FESAC), World Field Target Federation (WFTF), International Practical Shooting Confederation (IPSC), World Crossbow Shooting Association (WCSA) and the International Metallic Silhouette Shooting Union (IMSSU).

== See also ==
- List of shooting sports organizations

=== Other umbrella organizations for shooting ===
- French Shooting Federation
- Finnish Shooting Sport Federation
- Hellenic Shooting Federation
- Monaco Shooting Federation
- Norwegian Shooting Association
- Royal Spanish Olympic Shooting Federation
- Swiss Shooting Sport Federation
