= Zimbabwe Pistol and Smallbore Association =

National shooting association

- Chairman: I J Larivers
- Parent organization: International Practical Shooting Confederation

The Zimbabwe Pistol and Smallbore Association (ZPSA) is the Zimbabwean association for practical shooting under the International Practical Shooting Confederation. Zimbabwe was a founding member of IPSC and had a delegate on the Columbia Conference in 1976.
