= Dominican Republic Shooting Federation =

Sports governing body in the Dominican Republic

- Federación Dominicana de Tiro al Plato
- Formation: 1963
- Founder: Domingo Lorenzo
- Founded at: San Cristóbal
- Headquarters: El Higüero, Santo Domingo
- Location: Joaquin Balaguer Avenue
- Coordinates: 18.552534°N 69.973400°W
- Secretary General: Eduardo Álvarez
- President: José Antonio Mera
- Vice President: Ricardo Yunes
- Parent organization: International Shooting Sport Federation
- Website: http://fedotipla.com/website/

The Dominican Republic Shooting Federation was founded in 1963 and is the umbrella organization for sport shooting in the Dominican Republic, being a member of the international organization:

- International Shooting Sport Federation
