= IPSC Malaysia =

Malaysian practical shooting association

- Parent organization: International Practical Shooting Confederation

IPSC Malaysia is the Malaysian association for practical shooting under the International Practical Shooting Confederation.
