= German Shooting and Archery Federation =

German umbrella organization

- Formation: 1861 in Gotha
- Type: Sports federation
- Headquarters: Wiesbaden-Klarenthal, Germany
- Members: 1,452,471 in over 15,000 shooting clubs
- President: Josef Ambacher
- Website: www.DSB.de

The German Shooting Sport and Archery Federation (German: Deutscher Schützenbund, DSB) is the largest umbrella organization for sport shooters in Germany. It was founded in 1861 in Gotha and re-founded in 1951 in Frankfurt / Main. DSB was Germany's fourth-largest sports association in 2008, with 1,095,071 male and 357,400 female shooters.

Besides the well-known Olympic disciplines of Rifle, Pistol, Shotgun and Archery the German Shooting and Archery Federation also looks after the disciplines of Running Target, Muzzle-loader, Field Archery, Crossbow and Summer Biathlon.

The senior administrative body of the German Shooting and Archery Federation is the biannual General Meeting of Members. Executive bodies are the Managing Committee and the executive committee, the latter has nine members (president, five vice-presidents, national treasurer, national head of sports and national head of junior sports). Since 1994 Josef Ambacher from Starnberg is president.

The German Shooting and Archery Federation's objects are to support and supervise sport shooting according to standardized rules, to regulate training, to establish national leagues, to promote the shooting tradition, to represent its members nationally and internationally, to advocate the interests and needs of all young people especially those organised in shooting sports, to realize the "Deutschen Schuetzentag", to represent sport shooting and the general shooting tradition in the public uniformly.

The head office is located in Wiesbaden-Klarenthal under the direction of Secretary General Joerg Brokamp.

The DSB's monthly published official paper is named “Deutsche SchuetzenZeitung”.

== Sports regulation ==
The German Shooting and Archery Federation's sports regulation regulates the shooting in the various disciplines in over 1,500 shooting clubs of this federation. The DSB's guidelines of shooting ranges and the regulations of shooting ranges bindingly regulate the equipment of shooting ranges and the behaviour while performing the sport.

The German Shooting and Archery Federation is a member of the Deutscher Olympischer Sportbund (DOSB), the International Shooting Sport Federation (ISSF), the International Archery Federation (FITA), the European and Mediterranean Archery Union (EMAU), the International Crossbow Shooting Union (IAU), the European Shooting Confederation (ESC) and the Muzzle Loading Associations International Committee (MLAIC).

== Regional federations ==
Twenty regional federations are members of the German Shooting and Archery Federation. Their boundaries are not identical with the borders of the federal states.

- BD – Badischer Sportschützenverband (Baden)
- BL – Schützenverband Berlin-Brandenburg (Berlin-Brandenburg)
- BR – Brandenburgischer Schützenbund (Brandenburg)
- BY – Bayerischer Sportschützenbund (Bavaria)
- HH – Schützenverband Hamburg und Umgegend (Hamburg and surrounding area)
- HS – Hessischer Schützenverband (Hesse)
- MV – Landesschützenverband Mecklenburg-Vorpommern (Mecklenburg-Vorpommern)
- ND – Norddeutscher Schützenbund (North Germany)
- NS – Niedersächsischer Sportschützenverband (Lower Saxony)
- NW – Nordwestdeutscher Schützenbund (Northwest Germany)
- OP – Oberpfälzer Schützenbund (Upper Palatinate)
- PF – Pfälzischer Sportschützenbund (Palatinate)
- RH – Rheinischer Schützenbund (Rhineland)
- SA – Schützenverband Saar (Saarland)
- SB – Südbadischer Sportschützenverband (South Baden)
- SC – Sächsischer Schützenbund (Saxony)
- ST – Landesschützenverband Sachsen-Anhalt (Saxony-Anhalt)
- TH – Thüringer Schützenbund (Thuringia)
- WF – Westfälischer Schützenbund (Westphalia)
- WT – Württembergischer Schützenverband (Württemberg)
