= IPSC Indonesia =

- Parent organization: International Practical Shooting Confederation

IPSC Indonesia is the Indonesian association for practical shooting under the International Practical Shooting Confederation.
