= Irish Target Sports =

Association for practical shooting in Ireland

- Formation: 2004
- Parent organization: International Practical Shooting Confederation
- Website: irishtargetsports.ie

Irish Target Sports (ITS) is the Irish association for practical shooting under the International Practical Shooting Confederation. Founded in 2004 the region was provisionally accepted as an IPSC region in 2005 and definitively accepted in 2006.
