= IPSC Taiwan =

- Parent organization: International Practical Shooting Confederation

IPSC Taiwan is the Taiwanese association for practical shooting under the International Practical Shooting Confederation.
