= Serbian Association for Practical Shooting =

National body for dynamic handgun shooting

- Savez za praktično streljaštvo Srbije
- President: Spasoje Vulević
- Parent organization: International Practical Shooting Confederation
- Website: ipsc.rs

The Serbian Association for Practical Shooting, Serbian Savez za praktično streljaštvo Srbije (SPSS), is the Serbian association for practical shooting under the International Practical Shooting Confederation.
