= Practical Shooting Association of Costa Rica =

- La Asociación de Tiro Práctico de Costa Rica
- Parent organization: International Practical Shooting Confederation

The Practical Shooting Association of Costa Rica, Spanish La Asociación de Tiro Práctico de Costa Rica, is the Costa Rican association for practical shooting under the International Practical Shooting Confederation.
