= Belgian Parcours Shooting Association =

- President: Charles De Rongé
- Parent organization: International Practical Shooting Confederation
- Website: ipsc-belgium.be

The Belgian Parcours Shooting Association is the Belgian association for practical shooting under the International Practical Shooting Confederation.
