= English Target Shooting Federation =

England's governing body for shooting sports

- Sport: Shooting sports
- Jurisdiction: England
- Abbreviation: ETSF
- Founded: 2003
- Affiliation: Sport England; Team England; Commonwealth Shooting Federation
- Director: Peter Underhill
- Secretary: David Goodfellow

Official website
- www.englishtargetshootingfederation.co.uk
- (England)

The English Target Shooting Federation (ETSF) is the umbrella governing body for shooting sports in England. ETSF represents the Clay Pigeon Shooting Association, English Smallbore Shooting Union and the English Twenty Club. It is recognised by the UK Sports Councils; Sport England; Team England, British Shooting and others.

ETSF administers the England Performance Pathways for athletes training for the Commonwealth Games and nominates athletes to Commonwealth Games England for Commonwealth Games selection.

== World Class Performance ==
=== Commonwealth Games ===
Shooting has historically been a highly successful sport for England at the Commonwealth Games, with England placed third in the all-time medal table for Shooting at the Commonwealth Games - after India and Australia. Shooting has been contested at every Games since Kingston in 1966, with the exception of Edinburgh in 1970 and Birmingham in 2022.

At the 2014 Commonwealth Games in Glasgow, England shooter Michael Gault won his eighteenth medal - matching the record for most-medalled Commonwealth athlete in any sport. The record was jointly held with Australian shooter Phillip Adams.

Host country (England)

| Games | Gold | Silver | Bronze | Total | Rank |
|---|---|---|---|---|---|
| (Jamaica) 1966 Kingston | 2 | 1 | 0 | 3 | 3 |
| (New Zealand) 1974 Christchurch | 0 | 2 | 2 | 4 | 3 |
| (Canada) 1978 Edmonton | 0 | 3 | 1 | 4 | 2 |
| (Australia) 1982 Brisbane | 5 | 8 | 6 | 19 | ? |
| (Scotland) 1986 Edinburgh | 7 | 4 | 3 | 14 | ? |
| (New Zealand) 1990 Auckland | 3 | 8 | 5 | 26 | ? |
| (Canada) 1994 Victoria | 2 | 4 | 5 | 11 | ? |
| (Malaysia) 1998 Kuala Lumpur | 6 | 3 | 6 | 15 | ? |
| (England) 2002 Manchester | 5 | 5 | 8 | 18 | ? |
| (Australia) 2006 Melbourne | 5 | 8 | 5 | 18 | 3 |
| (India) 2010 New Delhi | 6 | 6 | 7 | 19 | 2 |
| (Scotland) 2014 Glasgow | 5 | 2 | 8 | 15 | 2 |
| (Australia) 2018 Gold Coast | 2 | 2 | 4 | 8 | 3 |
| Total | 49 | 60 | 67 | 176 | 3 |

Rankings based on overall number medals, tie-break by counting Gold/Silver/Bronze

== See also ==
- England at the Commonwealth Games
- Shooting at the Commonwealth Games
