= IPSC Ecuador =

Practical shooting association

- Parent organization: International Practical Shooting Confederation

IPSC Ecuador is the Ecuadorian association for practical shooting under the International Practical Shooting Confederation.
