= Turkey Practical Shooting Association =

- Türkiyenin Pratik Atış Yarışma
- President: Salim salim
- Parent organization: International Practical Shooting Confederation
- Website: ipsctr.com

Turkey Practical Shooting Association, Tuskish Türkiyenin Pratik Atış Yarışma, is the Turkish association for practical shooting under the International Practical Shooting Confederation.
