= Namibian Practical Shooting Association =

Sports governing body in Namibia

- Formation: 1 January 1978
- Headquarters: Windhoek
- Chairman: Gustaf Bauer
- Parent organization: International Practical Shooting Confederation
- Website: napsa.info

The Namibian Practical Shooting Association (NPSA) is the Namibian association for practical shooting under the International Practical Shooting Confederation.
