= International T-Class Confederation =

- Sport: Long range shooting
- Category: Shooting sport
- Abbreviation: ITCC
- Founded: 2014
- Headquarters: Bulgaria

Official website
- t-class.org

The International T-Class Confederation (ITCC), founded in 2014, promotes the shooting sport of T-Class which is mainly focused on competitions with precision rifle systems for various short, medium and long range distances, which may either be known or unknown. Headquarters reside in Bulgaria, and for the purpose of promotion of the sport internationally the organization offers a ruleset which regulates the design and management of competitions.

Competitions consist of several stages, and the competitors have to move between different parts of the stage under a time limitation, quickly assume stable or unstable shooting positions, and use theoretical background to successfully make precise long range shots. The main idea behind T-Class is to create realistic long range shooting competitions which are open to civilian sport shooters, police and military forces. A large emphasis is placed on safe firearm handling.

== Disciplines ==
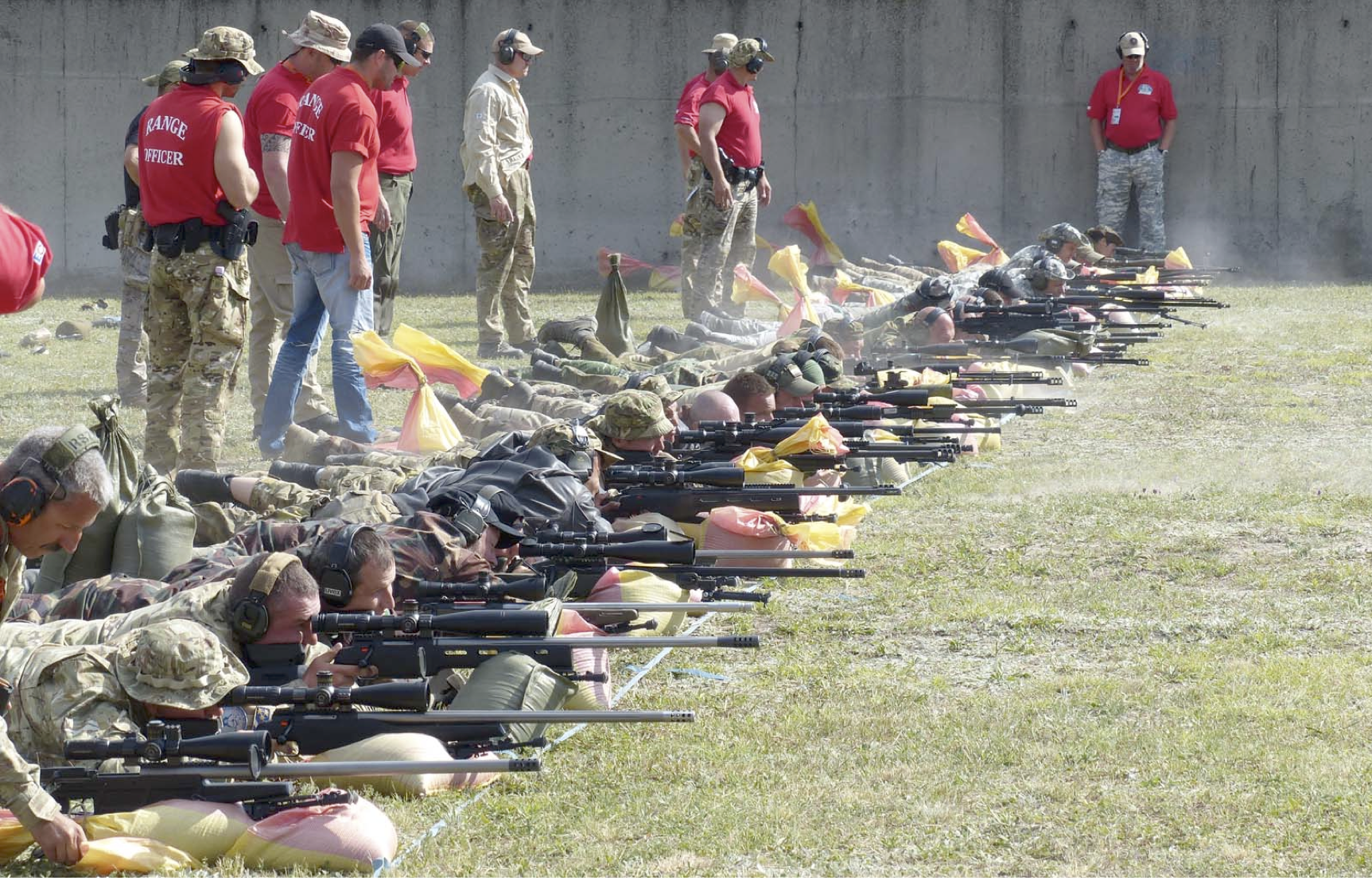
Firing line at a T-Class competition in 2016.

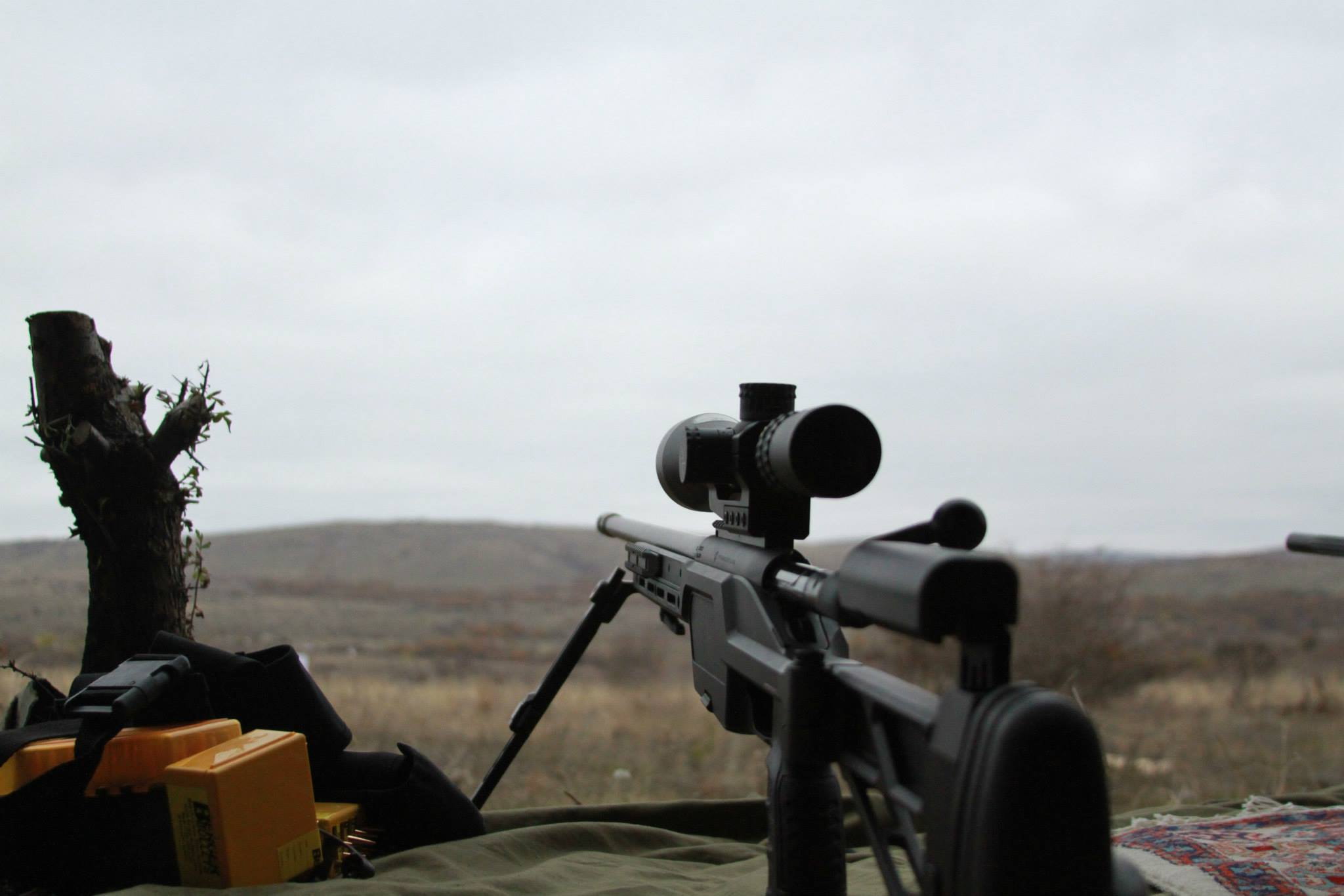
A Steyr SSG 04 or 08 rifle during a T-Class competition in 2016.

Competitions are divided into six major disciplines:

1. Long Range/Tactical Sniper. Precision rifle systems (sniper rifles) are used for reproduced but realistic stages with distances from 10 to 1000 meters.
2. Extreme Long Range. Precision rifle shooting at distances from 1000 to 1600 meters.
3. Ultra Long Range. Precision rifle shooting at very long distances of 1600 meters or more.
4. Multigun. Each of the stages may combine multiple firearms, such as precision rifles, medium range semi-auto rifles and/or pistols.
5. Support and Backup firearms. Shooting with pistols and medium range semi-auto rifles.
6. Rimfire. Target rifle shooting with .22LR caliber rifles.

Each competition is divided into three modules of stages, which test and evaluate the marksmanship qualities of the competitor – precision, speed, physical and mental resilience. Competitions can be held as either individual or teamwork challenges. Teamwork competitions involve two-person teams in which the results and rankings of both competitors are scored together as a team.

== Scoring system ==
Points are awarded by measuring each target in every exercise in milliradians (mrad) which takes into account its size and distance. There are also no-shoot targets which if struck incur penalties. The mrad system allows the usage of virtually all kinds of shooting targets, like paper, steel or clay targets, golf balls, soda cans, etc. Scoring is made with points attributed to the angular measurements of the target according to pre-defined tables. Usually each stage has a fixed time, but for some stages of Module 2 and 3, Comstock (hit factor) scoring is applied instead by taking the score on the targets divided by the time used on that stage.

Scoring of each module is calculated by adding results from all the module's stages. The competitor with highest summarized result is awarded with 100 percent. The scoring for the other competitors is then calculated as the proportional percentage in relation to the highest summarized score, with calculation up to two decimal places. The calculated sum in percentage from all the three modules finally assembles the match ranking and demonstrates the winner.

== Member associations ==
Currently, there are three ITCC licensed regions:

- Region: Baltic States (Lithuania, Latvia, Estonia), Lithuanian Long Range Shooting Federation
- Region: Bylgaria, Bulgarian T-Class Federation,
- Region: Russian Federation, Russian High Precision Shooting Federation,
- Region: SERBIA, SSSU TIRON
- Region: Region: WESTERN BALKANS, WBSA
- Region: POLAND, ARMA https://www.facebook.com/armabrzeg/
- Region: MALTA, MATSAC, website: https://www.facebook.com/MATSACMALTA/

https://t-class.org/regions/

== See also ==
- International Precision Rifle Federation (IPRF)
- International Confederation of Fullbore Rifle Associations (ICFRA)
