= Romanian Dynamic Shooting Association =

- Romania tir Dynamic
- Formation: December 2009
- Parent organization: International Practical Shooting Confederation
- Website: ipsc.ro

The Romanian Dynamic Shooting Association, Romanian Romania tir Dynamic, is the Romanian association for practical shooting under the International Practical Shooting Confederation.
