= IPSC Macau Association =

- Parent organization: International Practical Shooting Confederation
- Website: ipscmacau.org

IPSC Macau is the Macanese association for practical shooting under the International Practical Shooting Confederation.
