= Honduran Association Practical Shooting =

- Asociación Hondureña de Tiro Práctico
- Parent organization: International Practical Shooting Confederation

The Honduran Association Practical Shooting, Spanish Asociación Hondureña de Tiro Práctico, is the Honduran association for practical shooting under the International Practical Shooting Confederation.
