= Bulgarian Dynamic Shooting Federation =

- Formation: 2003
- Chairman: Mr. Mihail Vitanov
- Parent organization: International Practical Shooting Confederation
- Website: ipscbg.org

The Bulgarian Dynamic Shooting Federation (BDSF) is the Bulgarian association for practical shooting under the International Practical Shooting Confederation.
