= IPSC Uruguay =

- Parent organization: International Practical Shooting Confederation

IPSC Uruguay is the Uruguayan association for practical shooting under the International Practical Shooting Confederation.
