= Paraguay Practical Shooting Association =

- Club Paraguayo de Tiro Practico
- Parent organization: International Practical Shooting Confederation
- Website: cptp.org.py

The Paraguay Practical Shooting Association, Spanish Club Paraguayo de Tiro Practico, is the Paraguayan association for practical shooting under the International Practical Shooting Confederation.
