= Amateur Trapshooting Association =

- Jurisdiction: International
- Abbreviation: ATA
- Founded: 1900

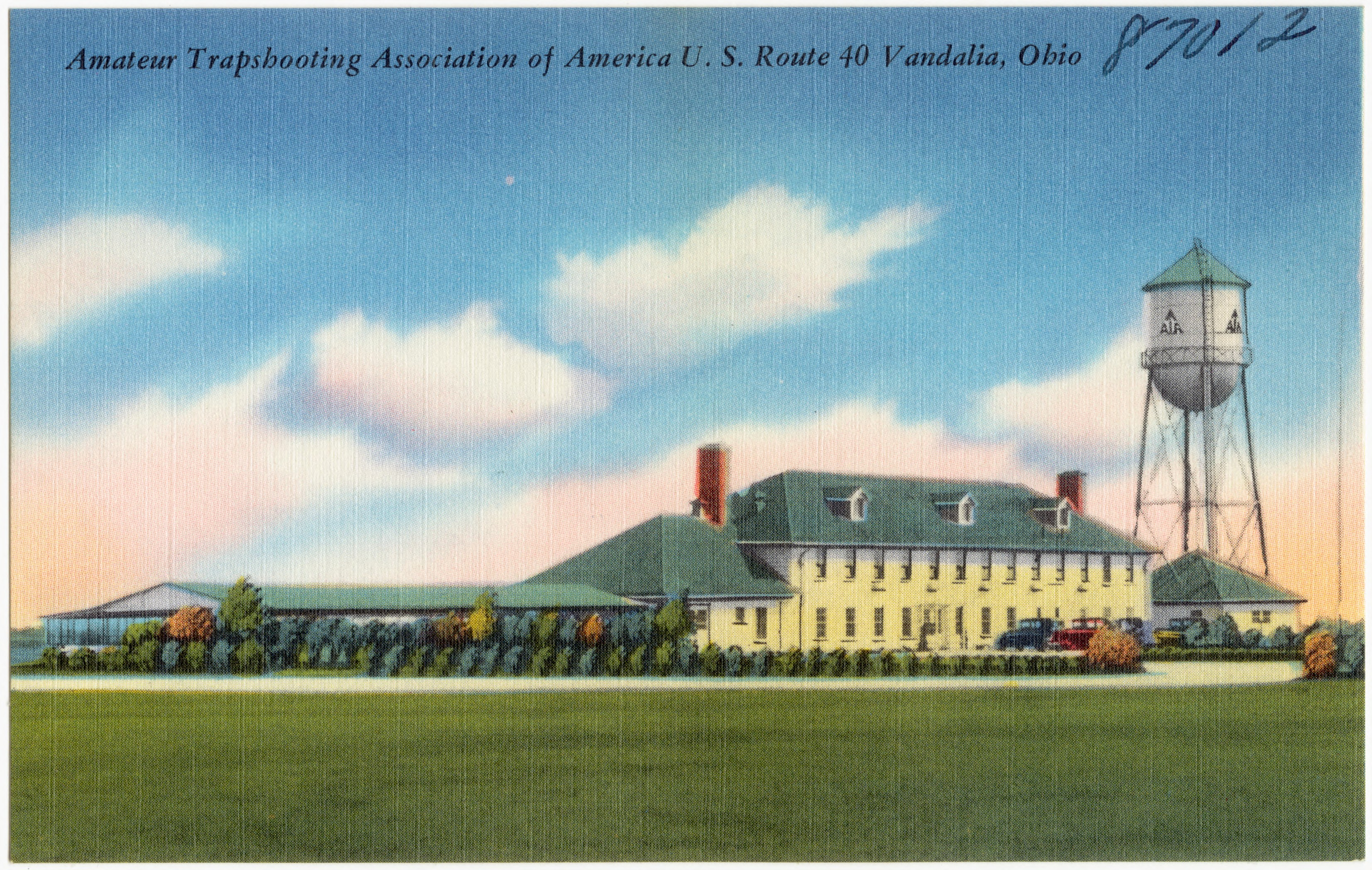
1940s postcard of headquarters in Ohio

The Amateur Trapshooting Association (ATA) serves as the governing body for the sport of American style of trapshooting. The ATA was founded in 1900 and as the American Trapshooting Association. Its first president was John Philip Sousa.

== See also ==
- List of shooting sports organizations
