= Slovenian Association for Practical Shooting =

Organization

- Slovenska zveza za praktično strelstvo
- Formation: 9 March 1994
- Parent organization: International Practical Shooting Confederation
- Website: ipsc.si

The Slovenian Association for Practical Shooting (Slovenska zveza za praktično strelstvo, SZPS) is the Slovenian association for practical shooting affiliated with the International Practical Shooting Confederation (IPSC). The association was founded on 9 March 1994. The association was founded 9 March 1994.
