= Hong Kong Practical Shooting Association =

Hong Kong, China Practical Shooting Association
- Formation: 1989
- Parent organization: International Practical Shooting Confederation
- Website: hkcpsa.org.hk

Hong Kong, China Practical Shooting Association (HKCPSA) is the Hong Kong, China region for practical shooting under the International Practical Shooting Confederation.
