= IPSC Japan =

- Parent organization: International Practical Shooting Confederation
- Website: ipsc-japan.org

IPSC Japan is the Japanese association for practical shooting under the International Practical Shooting Confederation.

== See also ==
- IPSC Action Air
