= IPSC Guatemala =

- Parent organization: International Practical Shooting Confederation

IPSC Guatemala is the Guatemalan association for practical shooting under the International Practical Shooting Confederation.
