= Brazilian Confederation of Practical Shooting =

- Confederação Brasileira de Tiro Pratico
- Abbreviation: CBTP
- Type: Shooting sport
- Parent organization: International Practical Shooting Confederation
- Website: cbtp.org.br
- Formerly called: Associacao Brasileira de Tiro Pratico (ABTP, Brazilian Practical Shooting Association)

The Brazilian Confederation of Practical Shooting, Portuguese Confederação Brasileira de Tiro Pratico (CBTP), is the Brazilian association for practical shooting under the International Practical Shooting Confederation.

In 1996, CBTP hosted the IPSC Handgun World Shoot.
