= IPSC Latvia =

Sports governing body in Latvia focused on practical shooting

- Parent organization: International Practical Shooting Confederation
- Website: ipsc.lv

IPSC Latvia is the Latvian association for practical shooting under the International Practical Shooting Confederation.
