= El Salvador Practical Shooting Association =

- Asociacion Salvadoreña de Tiro Práctico
- Parent organization: International Practical Shooting Confederation
- Website: ipscelsalvador.org

El Salvador Practical Shooting Association, Spanish Asociacion Salvadoreña de Tiro Práctico, is the Salvadoran association for practical shooting under the International Practical Shooting Confederation.
