= IPSC Chile =

- Formation: 1993
- Parent organization: International Practical Shooting Confederation
- Website: tiropractico.cl

IPSC Chile is the Chilean association for practical shooting under the International Practical Shooting Confederation.
