= Portuguese Shooting Federation =

Portuguese association for shooting sport under the IPSC and ISSF

- Federação Portuguesa de Tiro
- Parent organization: International Practical Shooting Confederation, International Shooting Sport Federation
- Website: fptiro.netipscworld.org/por

Portuguese Shooting Federation, Portuguese Federação Portuguesa de Tiro is the Portuguese association for shooting sport under the International Practical Shooting Confederation (IPSC) and the International Shooting Sport Federation (ISSF).
