= Practical Shooting Federation of Argentina =

Sports governing body in Argentina

- Federación de Tiro Práctico de la República Argentina
- Formation: 1986
- President: Claudio Alberto Capra
- Parent organization: International Practical Shooting Confederation
- Website: ipsc.org.ar

The Practical Shooting Federation of Argentina, Argentine Federación de Tiro Práctico de la República Argentina, is the Argentine association for practical shooting under the International Practical Shooting Confederation.
