= Muzzle Loaders Association of Great Britain =

Sports governing body in the United Kingdom

- Sport: Shooting Sports
- Jurisdiction: United Kingdom
- Abbreviation: MLAGB
- Founded: 1952
- Affiliation: MLAIC
- Headquarters: Wedgnock, Warwickshire

Official website
- mlagb.com
- (United Kingdom)

The Muzzle Loaders Association of Great Britain was formed in 1952 and is the governing body for muzzle loading within the UK. It is recognized by the Muzzle Loaders Associations International Committee. Its objectives are to encourage an interest in muzzle loading firearms; to promote, regulate and safeguard their use; and to preserve their freedom of collection. It produces a quarterly magazine called Black Powder.

Until 2014, the Association occupied the Grade-II "Muzzleloader's Association Hut" at the National Shooting Centre, Bisley.

== See also ==
- Black powder
- Muzzle Loaders Associations International Committee
- List of shooting sports organizations
