= Ukrainian Practical Shooting Association =

Sports governing body in Ukraine

- Украинский Практическая стрельба ассоциация
- Formation: 7 December 2003
- Parent organization: International Practical Shooting Confederation
- Website: ipsc.org.ua

The Ukrainian Practical Shooting Association, Russian Украинский Практическая стрельба ассоциация, is the Ukrainian association for practical shooting under the International Practical Shooting Confederation.
