= Croatian Practical Shooting Association =

- Parent organization: International Practical Shooting Confederation

The Croatian Practical Shooting Association is the Croatian association for practical shooting under the International Practical Shooting Confederation.
