= Practical Shooting Association of Panama =

- Club de Tiro Práctico de Panamá
- Parent organization: International Practical Shooting Confederation

The Practical Shooting Association of Panama, Spanish Club de Tiro Práctico de Panamá, is the Panamanian association for practical shooting under the International Practical Shooting Confederation.
