= Puerto Rico Practical Shooting Association =

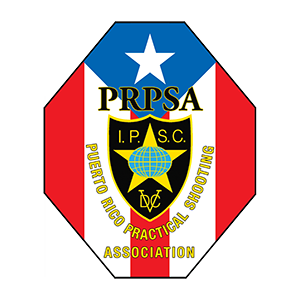
- Logo Puerto Rico Practical Shooting Association
- Parent organization: International Practical Shooting Confederation
- Website: prpsa.org

The Puerto Rico Practical Shooting Association is the Puerto Rican association for practical shooting under the International Practical Shooting Confederation.
