= Trinidad Rifle Association =

Sport shooting organisation

- Formation: 1879
- Parent organization: International Practical Shooting Confederation, International Shooting Sport Federation

Trinidad Rifle Association was founded in 1879 and is the umbrella organization for sport shooting in Trinidad and Tobago, being a member of the international organizations:

- International Practical Shooting Confederation
- International Shooting Sport Federation
- International Confederation of Fullbore Rifle Associations
- National Rifle Association of the United Kingdom
- Commonwealth Games Federation

== See also ==
- Fullbore target rifle
