= Match crossbow =

Target shooting sport

International Crossbow Shooting Union
- Jurisdiction: International
- Abbreviation: ICU
- Founded: June 24, 1956

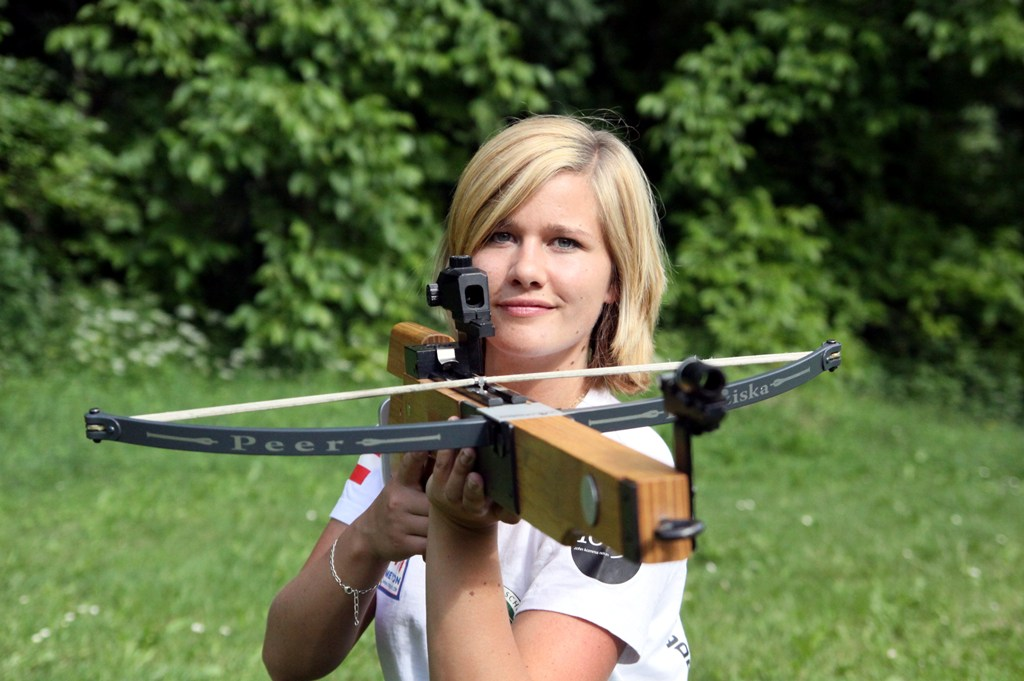
Franziska Peer of Austria, 2012 World Champion

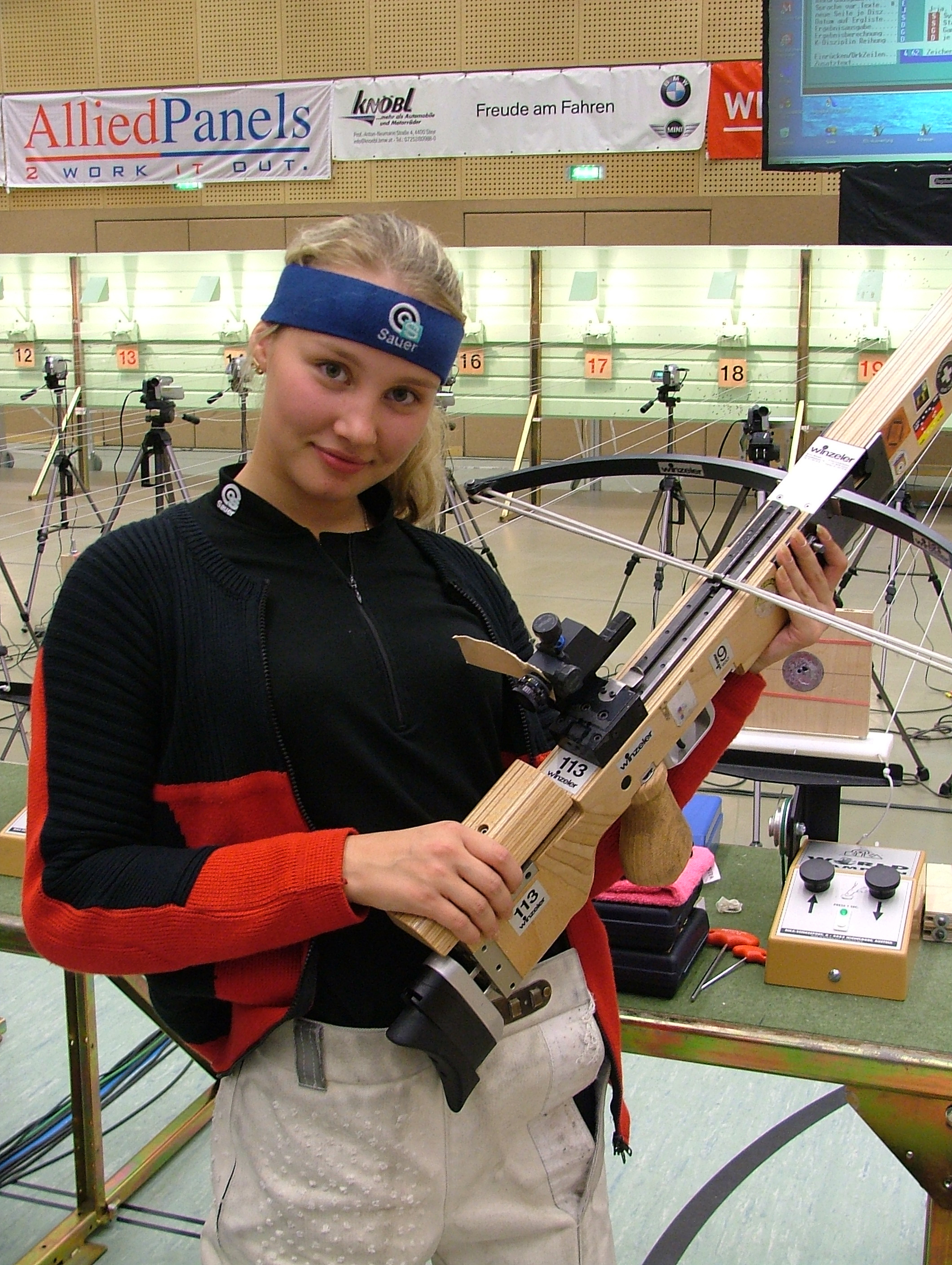
Anna Sushko of Russia, 2006 Junior World Champion, holding an IAU 10 m Match Crossbow

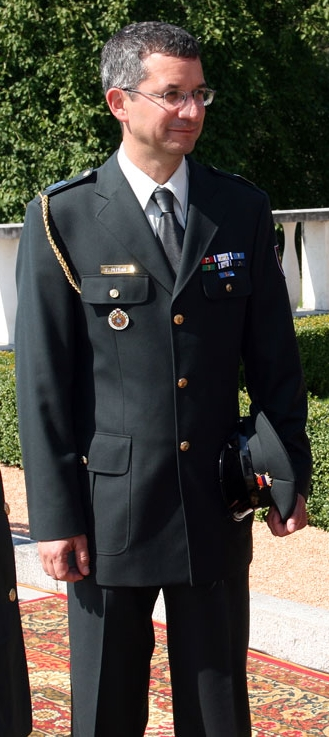
Rajmond Debevec 1991, 1993 and 1997 World Champion

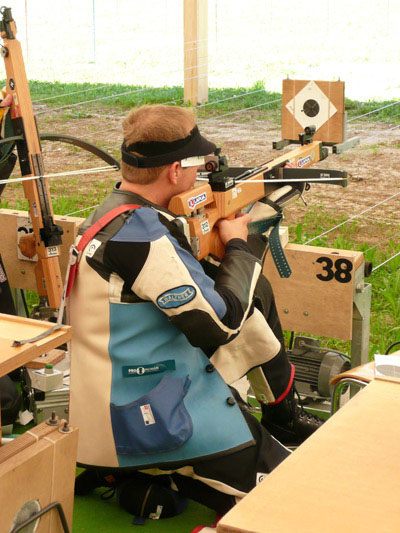
IAU 30 meter Match-crossbow World Championships, Sulgen, Switzerland 2008

Match crossbow is a target shooting sport using crossbows. Unlike field crossbow, match crossbow is quite similar to the Olympic rifle.

The International Crossbow Shooting Union (Internationale Armbrustschutzen Union-IAU) is the world governing body of crossbow target shooting. Founded 24. June 1956 in Landshut, Germany, the IAU supervises World and Continental crossbow championships in the two disciplines 10 m and 30 m Match. World Championships take place every two years, with Continental Championships on intervening years. Other International and IAU-Cup events take place annually.

== Equipment ==
The bolts are designed to have the same diameter as the air rifle pellet (.177) and Small bore caliber rifle cartridge (.22). The end of the bolt is a screw with a blunt end, with the screw swirling pattern helping the shooter to extract the bolt easily by unscrewing the bolt from the target board. To load the bolt, a lever is used. The lever can either be a separate item, or is a built-in mechanism of the crossbow. Match crossbow is not hand drawn. Since the early 1980s the match crossbow commonly use an electronic trigger that can provide dry fire mechanism, along with an electronic lighted level. The entire stock of the match crossbow is similar, if not the same, as an Olympic air rifle or small bore rifle, which is usually made of laminated wood stock.

== Disciplines ==
=== 30 meter Match ===
30 meter Match-crossbow shooting is the IAU's premier discipline and championships entry lists regularly include many Olympic-class small bore and air rifle athletes. Shooting takes place on enclosed outdoor ranges which are equipped with electrically driven match-crossbow target transport systems. Existing small bore ranges can be adapted for 30 m crossbow shooting. In the absence of permanent facilities, shooting can take place on temporary tented ranges using portable target systems.

Athletes shoot from the two positions "standing" and "kneeling". Crossbows are loaded and the bolt is shot at a black and white target card (one shot per card, the same bolt shot repeatedly). The bolt end is .22 in diameter.

At IAU World and Continental championships national federations can enter teams of three (3) competitors (of either gender) in two Categories; Open Class and U-21 Juniors. And by taking part at IAU Cup matches, a nation can win two (2) additional Quota-Spots thereby increasing to five (5) the number of competitors that the federation concerned can register for the next years World or Continental Match-crossbow championships. 30 m competition is a mixed event.

The competition program consists of 60 shots from 30 meters—30 shots "standing" plus 30 shots "kneeling". The Team competitions (60 shots) take place on the first day of championships. On the following day, the highest scoring competitors in the team events (Open Class and U-21 Juniors) will qualify to take part in the Individual championships. The numbers of competitors to qualify will depend on the number of targets available (usually 28). After 60 shots the top eight (8) competitors in each category will go forward to the Championships Finals (standing position, 10 shots on voice command). The winners of the gold, silver, and bronze medals are the three competitors with the highest combined scores (60 shot Qualification plus 10 shot Final). If scores are tied after 10 Final shots the competitors concerned continue shot-by-shot until a winner is declared.

=== 10 meter Match ===
10 meter Match, which was introduced into the IAU program in 1977, has attracted many new nations to the sport. It’s a highly technical event which is appreciated by top-flight air rifle athletes and match-crossbow specialists alike. Shooting takes place on indoor ranges equipped with electric target trolley system. Existing 10 m air rifle ranges can often be adapted, but in the absence of permanent facilities, a temporary shooting range can be set up in large Sports Hall using portable equipment. The Bolt end is .177 in diameter.

Competitors shoot from the standing position, as in ISSF air rifle. The bolt is shot at a black and white target card—one shot per card, the same bolt shot repeatedly. The size of the target is the same as the Olympic air-rifle target; 0.5 mm diameter 10-ring.

The 10 meter competition program is run in separate relays for each category; Men shoot 60 bolts, Women and U-21 Juniors each shoot 40 bolts. Team (3 shooters per team) and Individual competitions are run concurrently. The Team results are decided after 60 and 40 bolts respectively. In the Individual events the eight (8) top scoring competitors in each category qualify for Olympic-style 10-shot finals to decide the medal winners.

== International Crossbow Shooting Union ==
The International Crossbow Shooting Union (International Armbrustschützen Union (IAU) is an international sports organization devoted to crossbow shooting. Established in 1956, it is headquartered in Columbier, Switzerland.

Consisting of 24 nations, its current (as of 2017) president is Charles Méchin.

== IAU Championships Timeline ==
- 1958 1st European Match-crossbow Championships, Ghent, Belgium
- 1979 1st World Match-crossbow Championships, Linz, Austria
- 1982 1st World Field-crossbow Championships, Mikkeli, Finland
- 1989 1st European Field-crossbow Championships Wolverhampton, England
- 1992 1st Asian Field-crossbow Championships, Tainan, Taiwan

The five prominent crossbows brands used in competition are Wacker (Switzerland), Lothar Walther (Germany), Scherrer (Switzerland), Winzeler (Switzerland), and Hafen (Switzerland). Wacker is no longer in business. Lothar Walther no longer produces match crossbows. Scherrer, then known as Gustav Schmid, was the first company to produce a proper match crossbow back in 1951. Winzeler pioneered the electronic trigger and laminated wood and had been the dominant manufacturer since the mid 1980s. Hafen produced customized crossbows using Winzeler parts.

== Other Sanctioning Bodies ==
The sport of field crossbow is governed by both the IAU and the World Crossbow Shooting Association (WCSA). Field crossbow bolts are arrows, which are different from the match crossbow bolts. The target is archery type. Ausbow (Australia), Wolfszeit (Sweden), Pirineos (France) and LBG (France) are the field crossbow manufacturer specialists for this discipline. Target Crossbow is a shorter distance, competition that is similar to field crossbow, frequently held indoors. Again, the target is archery type and the bolts are arrows type. It is exclusively governed by the WCSA. All crossbows from these events must be hand drawn, unless the competitor is handicapped.

== See also ==
- List of shooting sports organizations
