= Philippine Practical Shooting Association =

Organization

- Formation: 11 November 1982
- President: Hon. Juan C. Ponce Enrile Jr.
- Parent organization: International Practical Shooting Confederation
- Website: ppsa.org.ph

Philippine Practical Shooting Association (PPSA) is the Philippine association for practical shooting under the International Practical Shooting Confederation. PPSA was founded in 11. November 1982 by Jack Enrile and other shooting sport enthusiasts, and the first formal match was held in April 1983. PPSA was formally accepted by IPSC as its 23rd member region in 1986.
