= IPSC Peru =

- Parent organization: International Practical Shooting Confederation

IPSC Peru is the Peruvian association for practical shooting under the International Practical Shooting Confederation.
