= Muzzleloading =

Shooting sport

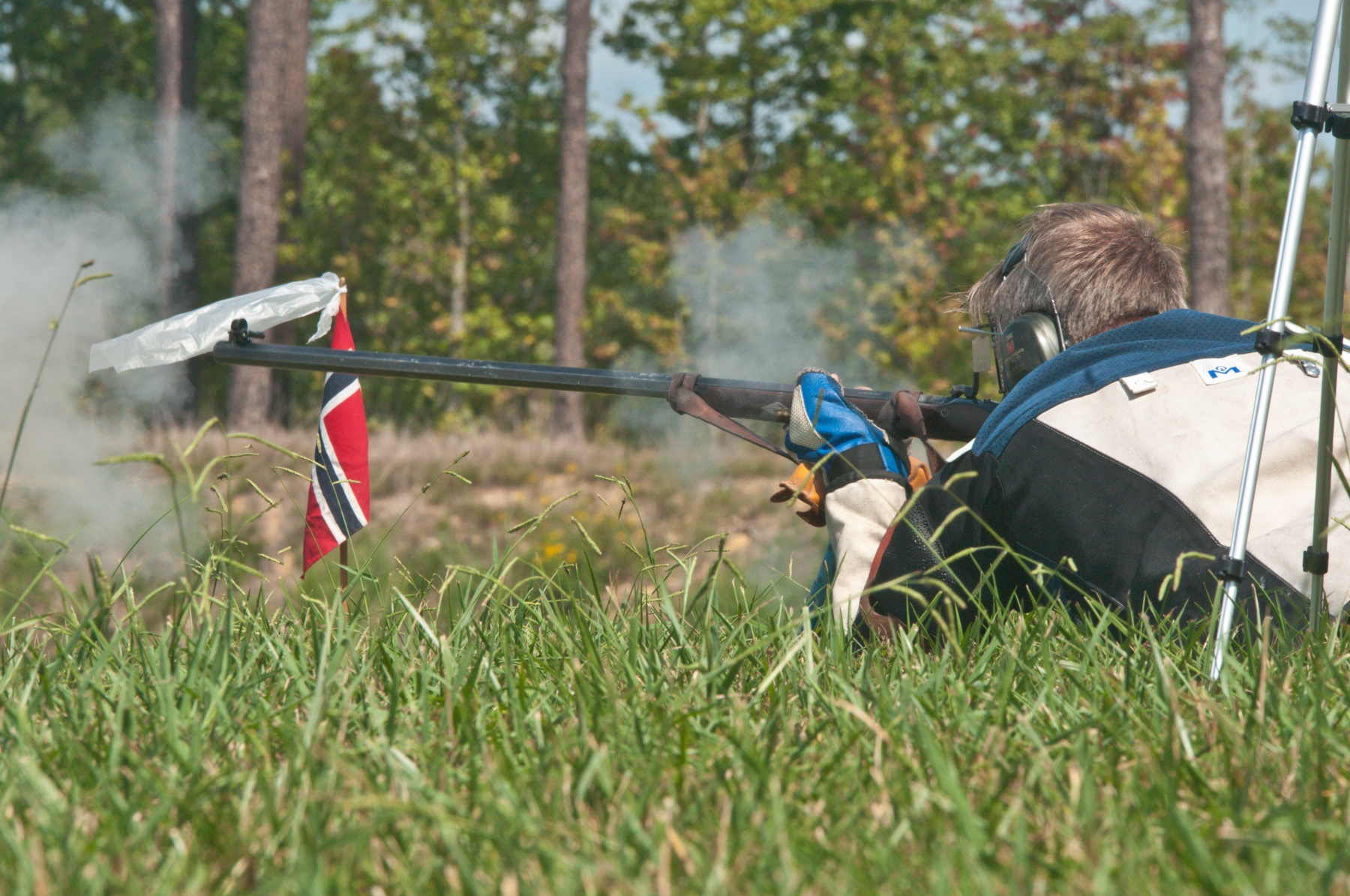
- A Norwegian competitor at the 2015 MLAIC Long Range World Championship
- Highest governing body: Muzzle Loaders Associations International Committee (MLAIC)
- First played: 1930s

Characteristics
- Contact: No
- Mixed-sex: Yes
- Type: Shooting sport
- Venue: Shooting range

Presence
- Country or region: Worldwide

Muzzleloading is the shooting sport of firing muzzleloading guns. Muzzleloading guns, both antique and reproduction, are used for target shooting, hunting, historical re-enactment and historical research. The sport originated in the United States in the 1930s, just as the last original users and makers of muzzleloading arms were dying out. The sport received a tremendous boost in the 1960s and 1970s. The Muzzle Loaders Associations International Committee was formed in 1970 and held its first World Championship in 1971. Since then a flourishing industry manufacturing working reproductions of historic firearms now exists in the United States and Europe, particularly in northern Italy, for example at Gardone Val Trompia, in the Province of Brescia. In the United States muzzleloading guns are, subject to a number of qualifications, generally not considered firearms. Subject to state law they may be possessed by persons who might otherwise not be legally allowed to own a firearm.

The American National Muzzle Loading Rifle Association holds two national tournaments a year in Friendship, Indiana as well as the Western National Shoot Event held in Phoenix, Ariz..

The Muzzle Loaders Associations International Committee (MLAIC) governs international competition with muzzle-loading arms. The MLAIC holds a Short Range World Championship in even-numbered years and a Long Range World Championship (300 to 1000 yards) on odd numbered years (South Africa has won the last 5 Long Range World Championships).

== Modern use ==
Driven by demand for muzzleloaders for special extended primitive hunting seasons, firearms manufacturers have developed in-line muzzleloading rifles with designs similar to modern breech-loading centerfire designs. Knight Rifles pioneered the in-line muzzleloader in the mid-1980s, manufacturing and selling them to this day. Savage Arms has created the 10ML-II, which can be used with smokeless powder, reducing the cleaning required. American Gun Craft have released the ROTO 12 shotgun that uses black powder.

== See also ==
- Cowboy action shooting
