= Italian Dynamic Shooting Federation =

- Federazione Italiana Tiro Dinamico Sportivo
- President: Gavino Mura
- Parent organization: International Practical Shooting Confederation
- Website: fitds.it

The Italian Dynamic Shooting Federation, Italian Federazione Italiana Tiro Dinamico Sportivo, is the Italian association for practical shooting under the International Practical Shooting Confederation. FITDS has been a part of CONI since 2010.
