= Asian Shooting Confederation =

International sports governing body

- Sport: Shooting
- Jurisdiction: Asia
- Membership: 47
- Abbreviation: ASC
- Founded: 1966; 60 years ago as the Pan Asian Shooting Union; 1967; 59 years ago as the Asian Shooting Federation
- Affiliation: ISSF
- Headquarters: Hawally, Kuwait
- President: Salman al-Sabah

Official website
- www.asia-shooting.org

The Asian Shooting Confederation is an association of the International Shooting Sport Federation's member federations from Asia.

== Competitions administered by the ASC ==
- Asian Shooting Championships
- Shooting at the Asian Games
