= Muzzle Loaders Associations International Committee =

Governing body for muzzle-loading firearms competition

Muzzle Loaders Associations International Confederation
- Jurisdiction: International
- Abbreviation: MLAIC
- Founded: 20 June 1971
- Secretary: Gerda Lejeune

Official website
- mlaic.org

The Muzzle Loaders Associations International Committee (MLAIC) is the world governing body for competition with muzzle-loading firearms, both originals (made prior to 1900) and replicas thereof.

MLAIC organises World Championships on even-numbered years, with European and Long Range Championships run in odd-numbered years. In 2022, Deutscher Schützenbund hosted the 29th World Championship in Pforzheim, Germany.

== History ==
According to early secretary general Paul Marchand, the organization was preceded by the Muzzle Loaders Association of Great Britain, founded in 1952, then the French equivalent, Arquebusiers de France, in 1962. Competition between the two, followed by similar organizations popping up in Italy and Germany, led to an initial international championship in Vaudoy-en-Brie, France, in 1971.

From there, a provisory international committee gave way to the foundation of the MLAIC. Its first championship was hosted by the Real Federacion Española de Tiro Olimpico in Madrid on 23 and 24 September 1972.

== Member nations ==
The European Zone consists of Austria, Belgium, Bulgaria, Czech Republic, Denmark, Finland, France, Germany, Great Britain, Hungary, Ireland, Italy, Luxembourg Netherlands, Norway, Poland, Portugal, Slovak Republic, Spain, Sweden, and Switzerland.

The Pacific Zone consists of Argentina, Australia, Canada, Japan, New Zealand, South Africa, and the United States.

Correspondent nations without member status are Brazil, Croatia, Greece, Malta, India and Russia.

== Secretaries general ==
- 1970 – 2002: Capt. Paul Marchand, France
- 2002 – 2003: Andrew Courtney, Great Britain
- 2003 – 2007: Donald (Bucky) Malson, USA
- 2007 – 2008: Kim Atkinson, Australia (Temp)
- 2008 – 2016: David Brigden, Great Britain
- 2016 – 2024: Gerhard Lang, Germany
- 2024 – Current: Gerda Lejeune, Nederland

== See also ==
- List of shooting sports organizations
