= Monaco Shooting Federation =

Sports governing body in Monaco

- Fédération Monégasque de Tir
- Abbreviation: FMTir
- Formation: 15 October 1921
- Official language: French
- President: Christian Zabaldano
- Parent organization: ISSF, IPSC, FITASC
- Website: fmtir.org

The Monaco Shooting Federation, Monégasque Fédération Monégasque de Tir is the Monacan association for shooting sport under the International Practical Shooting Confederation (IPSC), the International Shooting Sport Federation (ISSF) and the Fédération Internationale de Tir aux Armes Sportives de Chasse.

== See also ==
- List of shooting sports organizations
