= Weapon mount =

Apparatus used to affix a weapon to an installation or vehicle

A weapon mount is an assembly or mechanism used to hold a weapon (typically a gun) onto a platform in order for it to function at maximum capacity. Weapon mounts can be broken down into two categories: static mounts and non-static mounts.

== Static mount ==
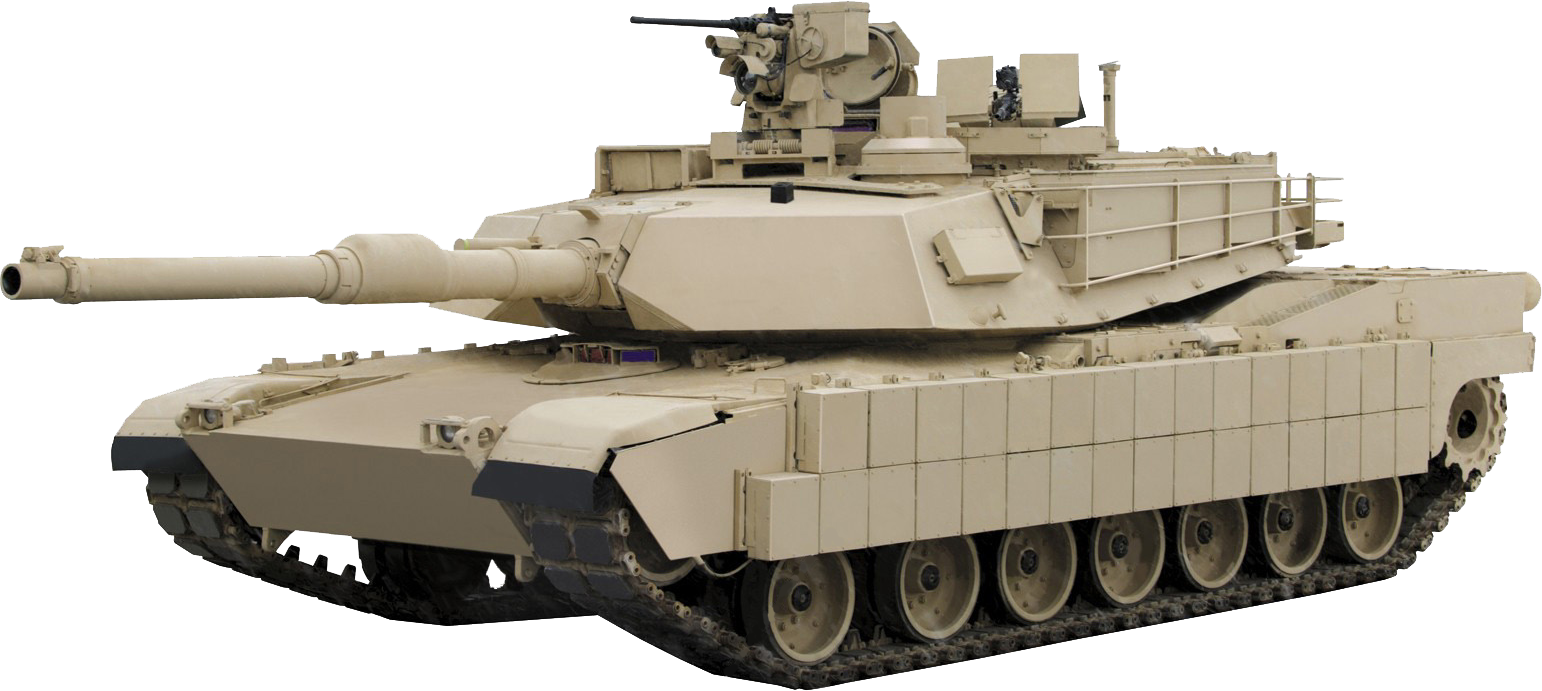
An M1 Abrams with a turret-mounted gun, coaxial machine gun, pintle-mounted loader's machine gun and commander's remote weapon station.

A static mount is a non-portable weapon support component either mounted directly to the ground, on a fortification, or as part of a vehicle.

=== Turret ===
A gun turret protects the crew or mechanism of a weapon and at the same time lets the weapon be aimed and fired in many directions.

A turret is a rotating weapon platform, strictly one that crosses the armour of whatever it is mounted on with a structure called a barbette (on ships) or basket (on tanks) and has a protective structure on top (gunhouse). If it has no gunhouse it is a barbette, if it has no barbette (i.e., it is mounted to the outside of the vehicle's armour) it is an installation.

Turrets are typically used to mount machine guns, autocannons or large-calibre guns. They may be human operated or remotely controlled. A small turret, or sub-turret on a larger one, is called a cupola. The term cupola also describes rotating turrets that carry no weapons but instead are sighting devices, as in the case of tank commanders. A finial is an extremely small sub-turret or sub-sub-turret mounted on a cupola turret.

Typically the gun is fixed on its horizontal axis and rotated by turning the turret, with trunnions on the gun used to allow it to elevate. Alternatively, in an oscillating turret the entire upper section of the turret moves to elevate and depress the gun.

=== Casemate ===
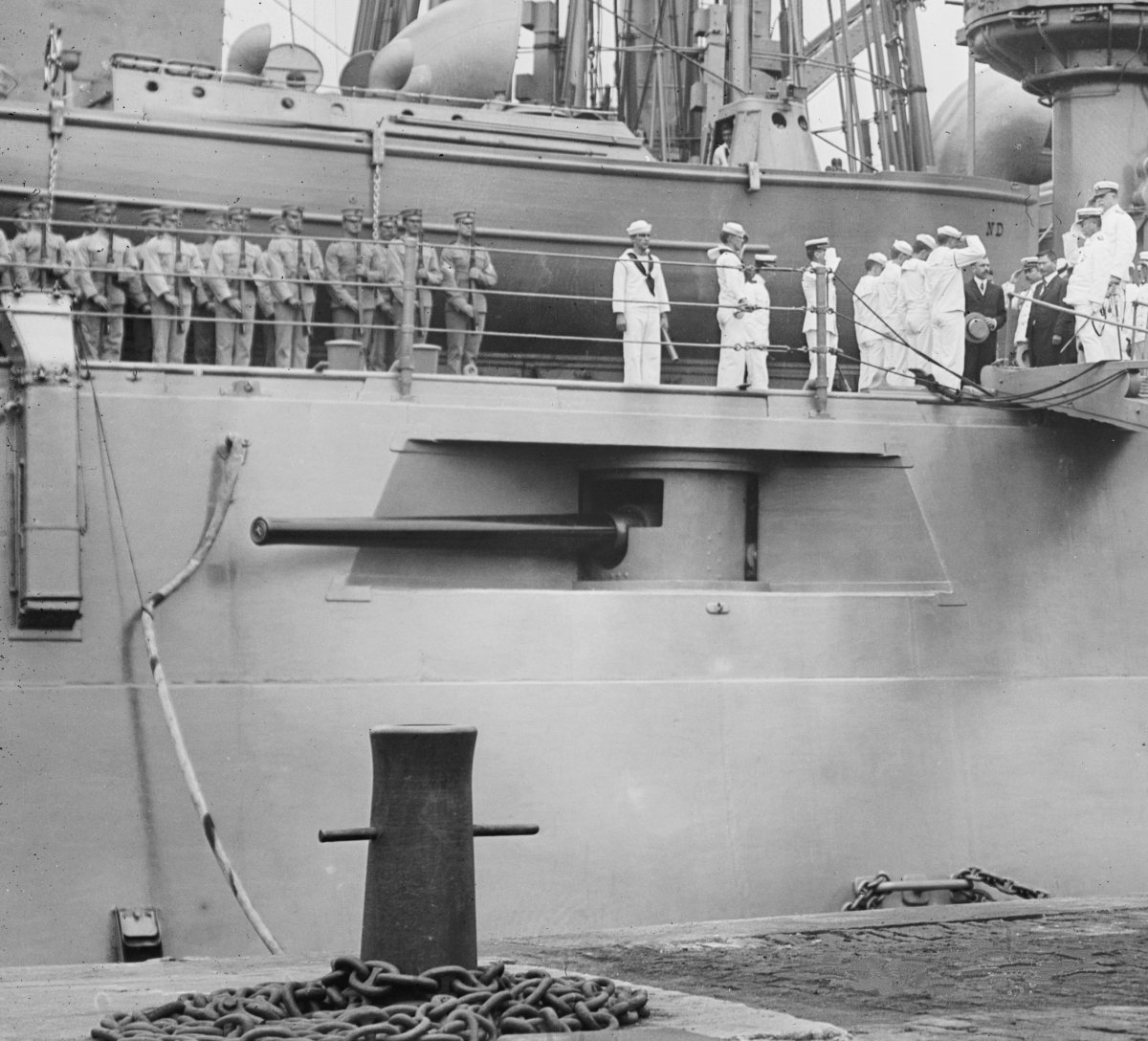
Casemate-mounted 5"/50 caliber gun on the USS North Dakota (BB-29)

A casemate is an armoured structure consisting of a static primary surface incorporating a limited-traverse gun mount: typically, this takes the form of either a gun mounted through a fixed armour plate (typically seen on tank destroyers and assault guns) or a mount consisting of a partial cylinder of armour "sandwiched" between plates at the top and bottom (as with the sponson guns of early tanks and the secondary armament of Dreadnought-era battleships).

=== Coaxial ===
A coaxial mount, pioneered on the T1 Light Tank in the late 1920s and widely adopted by the late 1930s, is mounted beside or above the primary weapon and thus points in the same general direction as the main armament, relying on the host weapon's ability to traverse in order to change arc. The term coaxial is something of a misnomer as the arrangement is strictly speaking paraxial (i.e., parallel axes, as opposed to the same axis), though for ballistic purposes their sight axes are effectively the same in practical terms.

Nearly all main battle tanks and most infantry fighting vehicles have a coaxial machine gun mounted to fire along a parallel axis to the main gun. Coaxial weapons are usually aimed by use of the main gun control. It is usually used to engage infantry or other "soft" targets where use of shots from the main gun would be dangerous, ineffective or wasteful.

Some weapons such as the M40 recoilless rifle and the Mk 153 Shoulder-Launched Multipurpose Assault Weapon have a smaller caliber spotting rifle mounted in coaxial fashion to the barrel or launch tube. These weapons fire special cartridges designed to mimic the ballistic arc of the host weapon's ammunition, using tracer or point-detonating rounds so that a gunner can easily determine where a shot will land in order to place fire accurately. Due to the adoption of more advanced systems such as laser rangefinders, they are rarely used on modern weapons.

=== Ground mount ===
==== Fixed ====
A fixed mount is incapable of horizontal movement (traverse), though not necessarily incapable of vertical movement (elevation). The entire mounting must be moved in order to change direction of fire. Fully fixed mounts (no traverse or elevation) are most commonly found on aircraft, and most commonly direct the weapon forward, along the aircraft's vector of movement, so that a pilot can aim by pointing the nose of the aircraft at the target. Some aircraft designs used different concept of fixed mounts, as found in Schräge Musik or AC-47 Spooky. The Stridsvagn 103 is an unusual turretless main battle tank with a fixed main gun that is aimed using the tank's tracks and suspension.

Military aircraft also often used fixed mounts called hardpoints or weapon stations to attach disposable stores such as missiles, bombs and external fuel tanks: these devices mount a standardised set of locking lugs to which many different types of armament can be affixed.

Fixed traverse mounts capable of only elevation are common on larger self-propelled guns, as well being the mounting method used by virtually all railroad guns.

==== Pintle ====
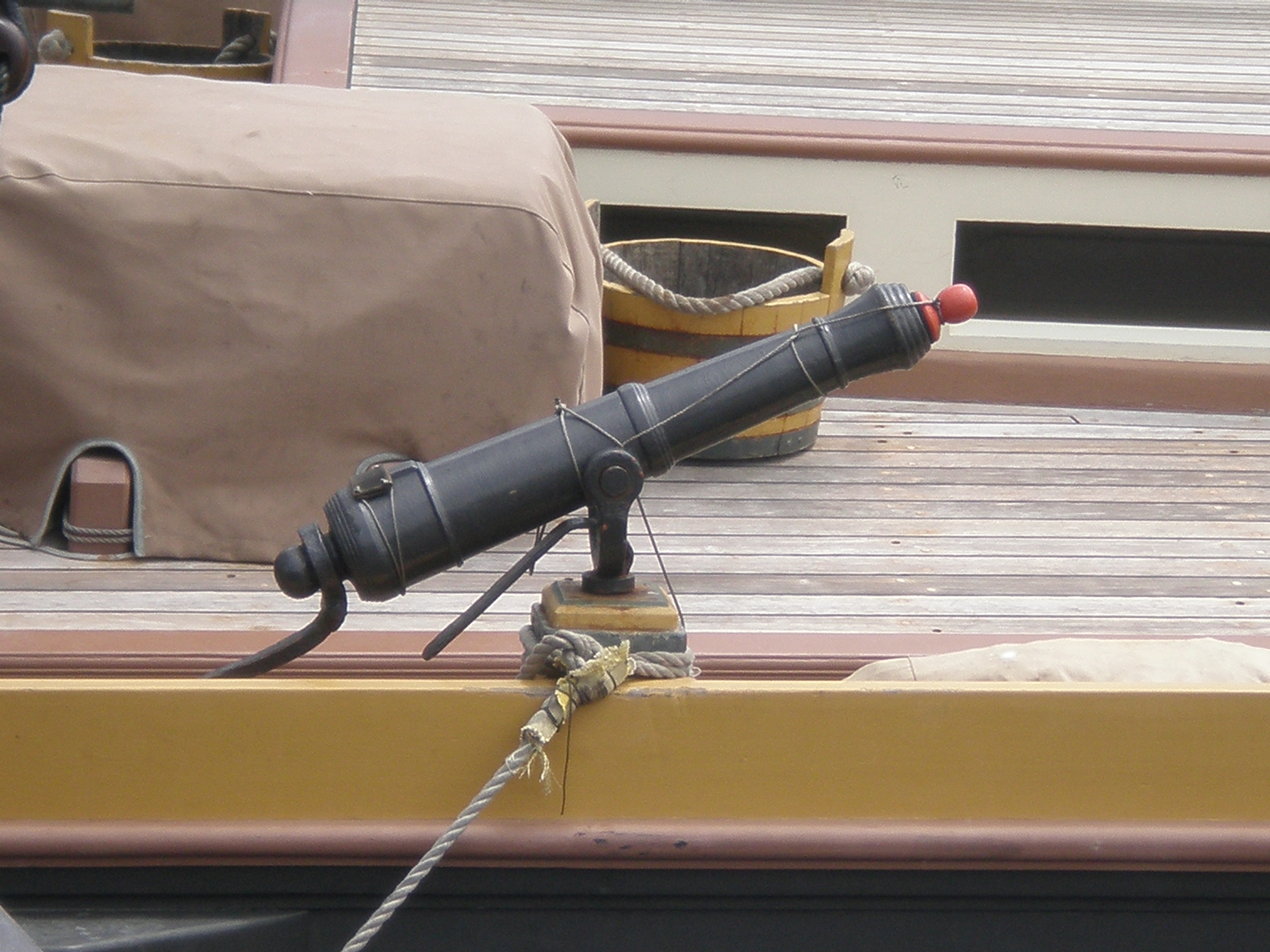
A swivel gun mounted on the American topsail schooner Lynx.

A pintle mount is a swiveling mount that allows the gun to be freely traversed or elevated, while the base of the mount is still fixed keeping the whole system in one stable position: typically the mounting is either a rod on the underside of the gun (a pintle rod) that mates with a socket mechanism, or an intermediary cradle that mounts to the sides of the weapon's barrel or receiver. Due to the stability offered by the mount, the gun typically does not need a shoulder stock, with many modern examples using two-handed spade grips. It is most commonly found on armoured vehicles, improvised fighting vehicles such as technicals, side gun stations on WW2 and earlier-era bomber aircraft, and the door guns of armed transport helicopters. Early single-shot examples referred to as swivel guns were commonly mounted on the deck rails of naval vessels in the Age of Sail to deter boarders at close range.

Larger guns require a heavier mounting referred to as a pedestal, and even larger guns a turntable platform: a pedestal mount may be directly manipulated, but larger guns typically require the use of mechanical handwheels or hydraulic/electric actuator assistance for traversing and elevation adjustments. Very large mounts might also include seats for the crew fixed to the gun cradle or the floor of the turntable.

Unlike a turret, this type of mount typically has little or no armour protection, usually at most a frontal gun shield.

=== Remote weapon station/installation ===
This is a power-assisted mounting on the outside of whatever it is mounted on, usually bolted down to the surface and with only the control wires crossing the armour. Such mountings are typically used on armoured fighting vehicles for anti-personnel weapons to avoid exposing a crewmen to return fire, and on naval vessels for self-contained CIWS systems.

=== Swing arm ===
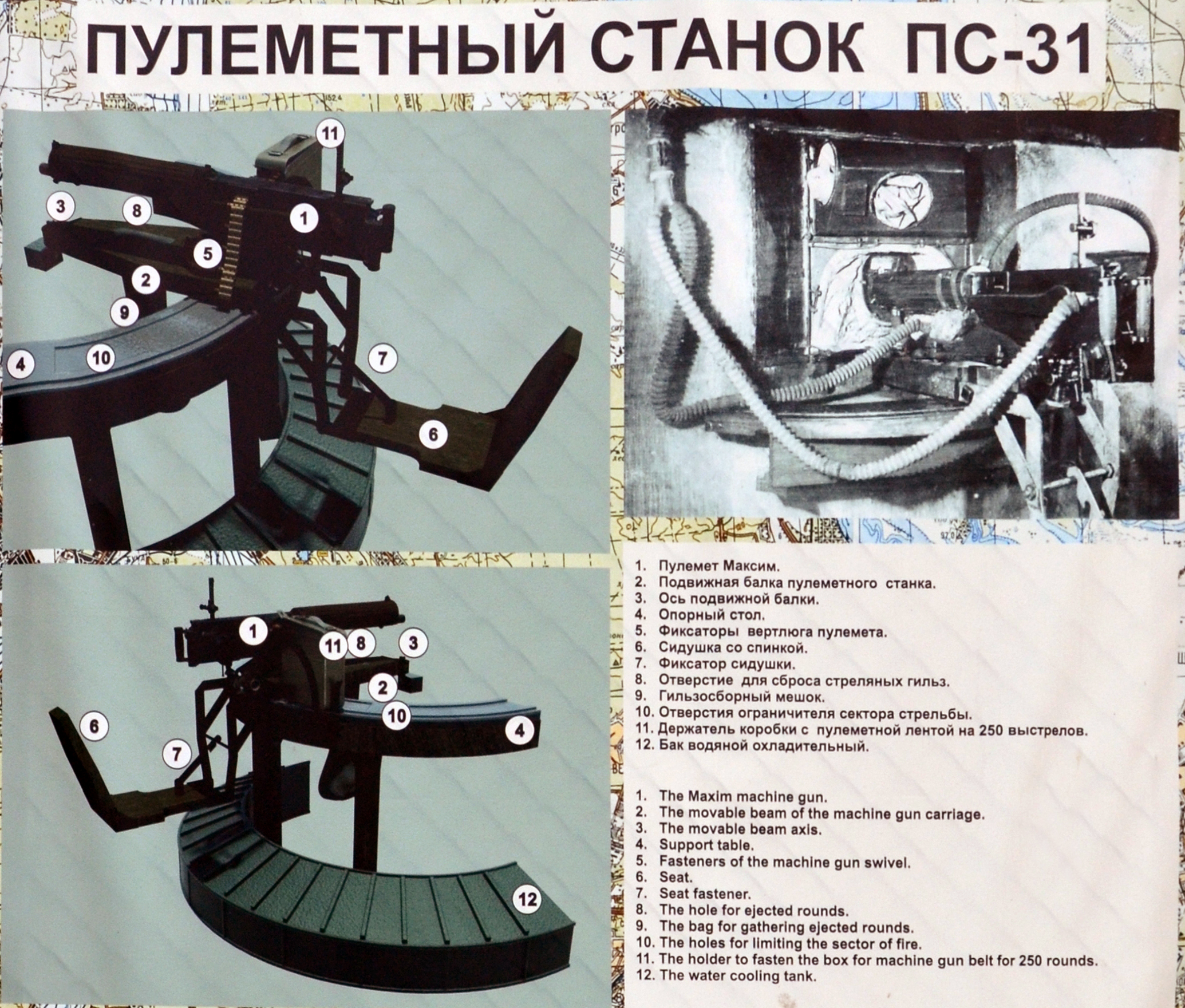
Maxim gun mount type PS-31 from pillbox No. 186 of the Kiev Fortified Region. The mount includes elements of the machine gun cooling system.

A swing mount is a fixed mount that allows a far greater and more flexible arc of fire than the simple pintle mount system. Utilising a system of one or two articulated arms the gunner can swing the weapon through a wide arc even though the gunner's position is fixed relative to the mount. These systems vary in complexity from a simple arm, to a double arm with the ability to lock the weapon in any firing position.

== Non-static mount ==
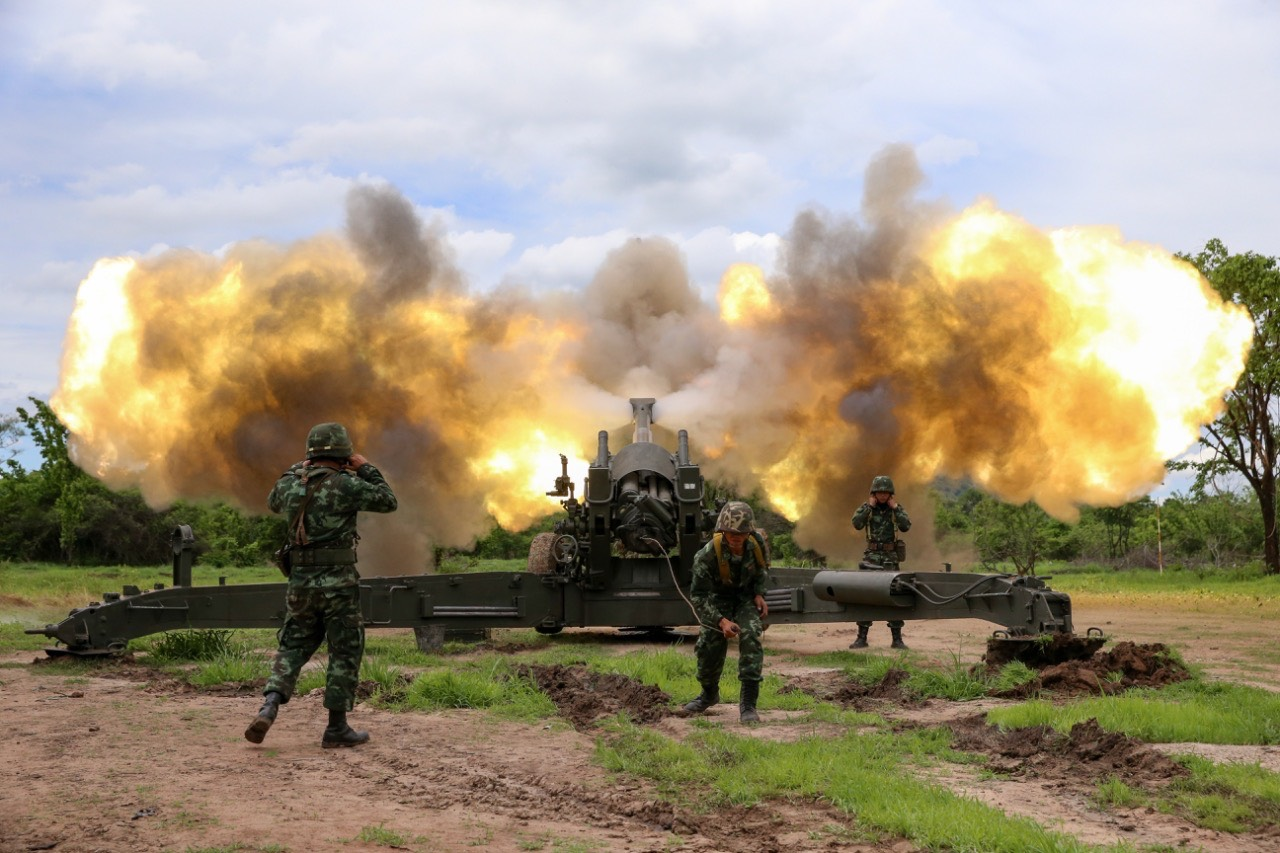
M198 Howitzer, an example of a wheeled split-trail carriage mount.

A mobile mount is a weapon mount that is portable or can be transported around by infantry.

=== Carriage ===
Large weapons that cannot easily be lifted by infantry require a platform that can be moved around when mobility is needed. Wheels are typically used to allow maneuverability, although skids are sometimes preferred in cold climates where icy/snowy surfaces become problematic for wheels, and some particularly heavy guns have historically used unpowered tracks. Small carriages can be pushed/pulled by hands in the manner of a small cart or wheelbarrow, while larger ones require traction by animals or vehicles. Large weapons often use a deployable base to make them easier to transport and more stable in their firing position: split-trail mounts (where two long "trails" can be brought together to make a towing bar) and cruciform bases with two folding legs are examples.

"Pack howitzers" are a special case where the carriage can be completely dismantled and split into a series of loads for transport over rough terrain, typically by mules.

=== Baseplate ===
Typically used by infantry mortars, this is a flat plate mounted to the weapon directly or using a ball joint. The plate is usually square, rectangular or circular, and designed to spread out the weapon's recoil force to prevent it from being piledriven into the ground: it is often, though not always, used with a two-legged stand to elevate the barrel at a desired angle.

=== Monopod ===
A monopod has one leg and does not provide stability along the coordinate axis of motion. Monopods have the advantage of being light and compact although when used in firing mode it does not have enough stability to be used with large firearms. Monopods are typically used on short-barreled, precision-fire firearms. Many sniper rifles feature a monopod integrated into their stock, providing the effect of a tripod when it is combined with a frontal bipod.

=== Bipod ===
A bipod has two legs and provides stability along the left-to-right coordinate axis of motion.

The bipod permits the operator to rest the weapon on the ground, a low wall, or other object, reducing operator fatigue and permitting increased accuracy.

Bipods can be of fixed or adjustable length, and can either be an accessory mounted to the weapon or integral to it. Those of higher quality can be tilted and also have their tilting point close to the bore central axis, allowing the weapon to tilt left and right a small amount, allowing a quick horizontal sight picture on uneven ground and keeping the operator close to the ground.

=== Tripod ===
A tripod has three legs and provides stability along the left-to-right and fore-and-aft coordinate axis of motion. Tripods have the disadvantage of being heavy and bulky, but provide far superior stability and do not require the user to exert any force in order to keep the mount balanced. Tripods are typically used on support weapons such as heavy machine guns, repeating grenade launchers, recoilless rifles and large infantry anti-tank missiles systems such as BGM-71 TOW. These tripods are often much larger than the weapon itself and may have mechanical elevation and traverse controls for indirect fire.

The tripod permits the operator to rest the weapon on the ground and thus the gun feels lighter to the shooter and accuracy is increased.

=== Shooting saddle ===
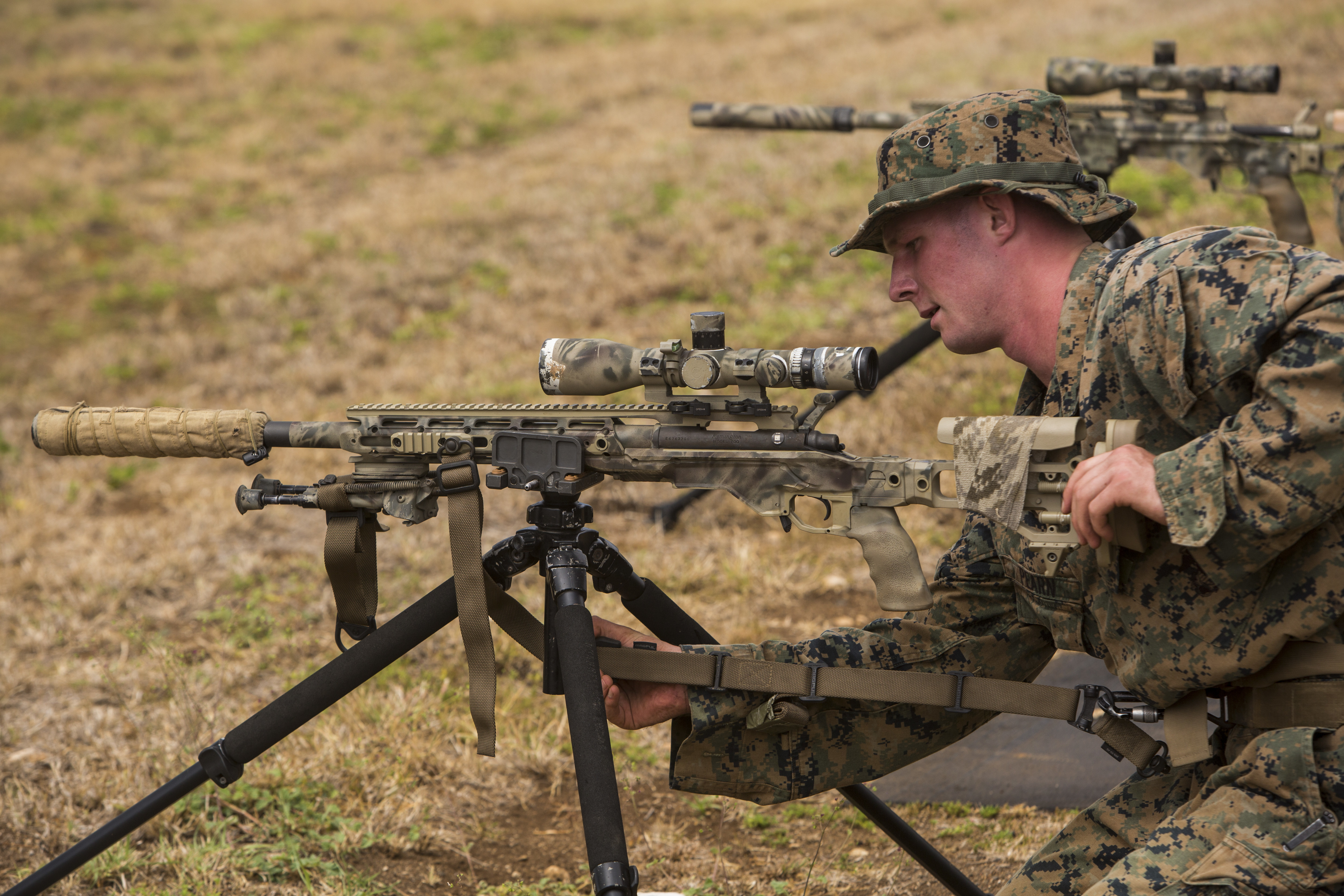
An M40A6 sniper rifle secured in a Hog Saddle mount

A shooting saddle typically uses a tripod head but, instead of mounting the weapon directly to the tripod, the saddle is mounted to the tripod head and the rifle is cradled within the saddle. These saddles began to appear in the late 2000s as a solution to provide a stable shooting platform for snipers and marksmen who may need to take a shot from somewhere other than the prone position. Prior to their introduction, snipers had only shooting sticks or jury-rigged setups to use.

=== Fork rest/shooting sticks ===
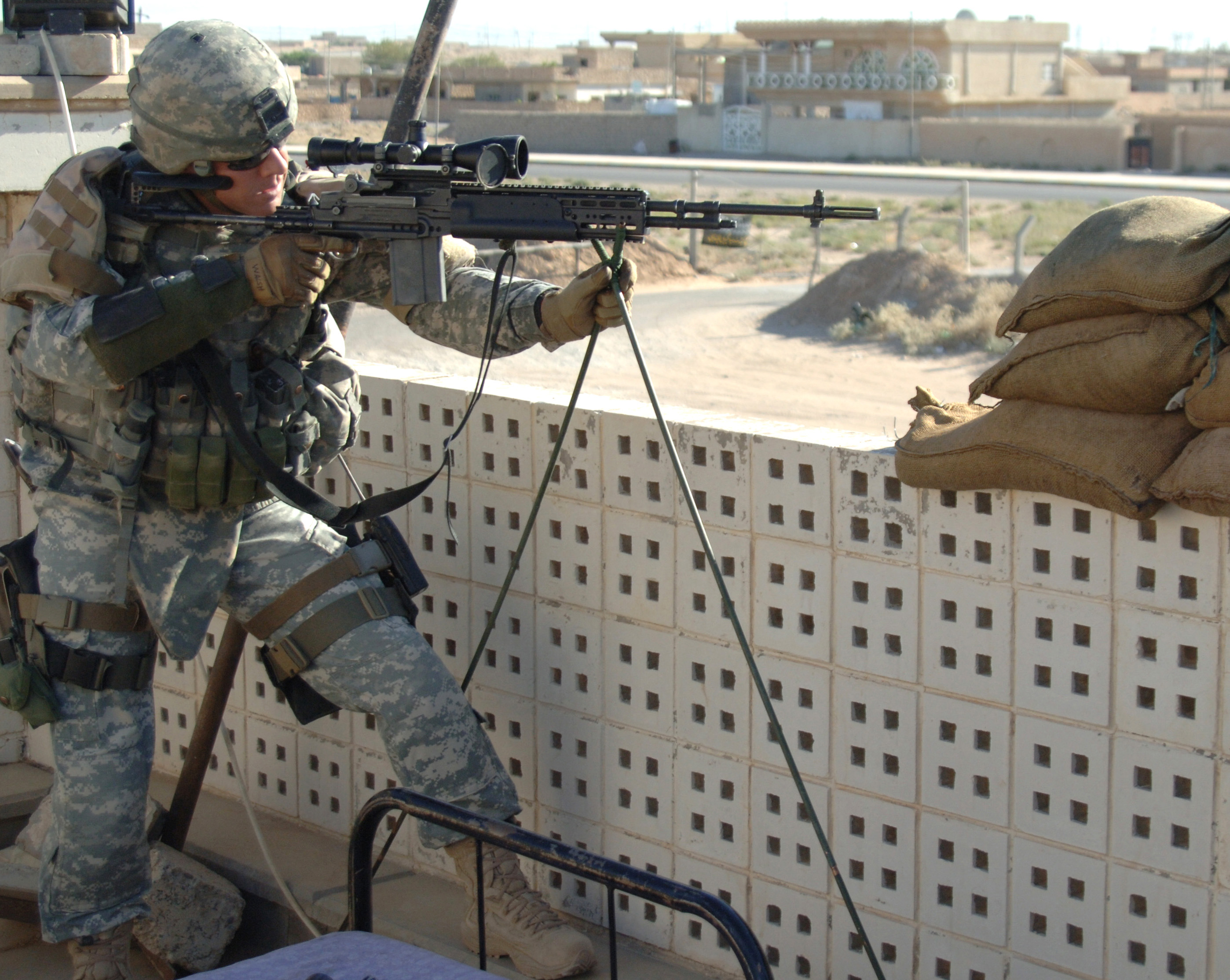
US Soldier using an M14 rifle equipped with a Sage M14ALCS chassis stock resting on two legged shooting sticks.

Shooting sticks are portable weapon mounts used by field shooters, like hunters, snipers and metallic silhouette black-powder rifle shooters. They can be anything from purpose-built rests to constructions made from actual sticks, and have between one and three legs. They have existed since the days of early arquebusiers, when they would typically be a long thin stake with a U-shaped rest at the top, referred to as a fork rest.

On firearms, shooting sticks are commonly used on rifles to provide a forward rest and reduce motion. Shooting sticks permit the operator to rest the weapon on the ground, a low wall, or other object, reducing operator fatigue and permitting increased accuracy.

=== Underbarrel ===
This type of infantry weapon mount is used to mount a weapon beneath the barrel of a larger one, using either special mounting equipment or an accessory rail. This allows the user to have two weapons ready in hand and a simple change of grip is all that is needed to fire the accessory weapon. It is most commonly used to mount a single-shot grenade launcher to a rifle or a cut-down shotgun to breach doors.

=== Individual ===
Various forms of weapon mounts have existed for individual use, or experimented with for military trials to ease the handling of heavy weapons and reduce fatigue on the battlefield. An example is the affusto d'assalto (assault carriage) or "bari mount" that was devised by the 139° e 140° Reggimento Fanteria Brigata "Bari" in 1917 and used on the Villar Perosa aircraft submachine gun for walking fire tactics. This allowed the user not only to fire the spade grip weapon but also throw grenades at the same time during combat. The Bari mount was used in trench raids, and was integral to the doctrinal purpose of the so-called 'pistollettieri' sections who were effectively grenadier-submachine gunners.

Another example is the Third Arm Weapon Interface System and REAPER weapon support system.

== See also ==
- Free gun
- Firing port
- Gun pod
