= Hunter Field Target =

Target shooting sport

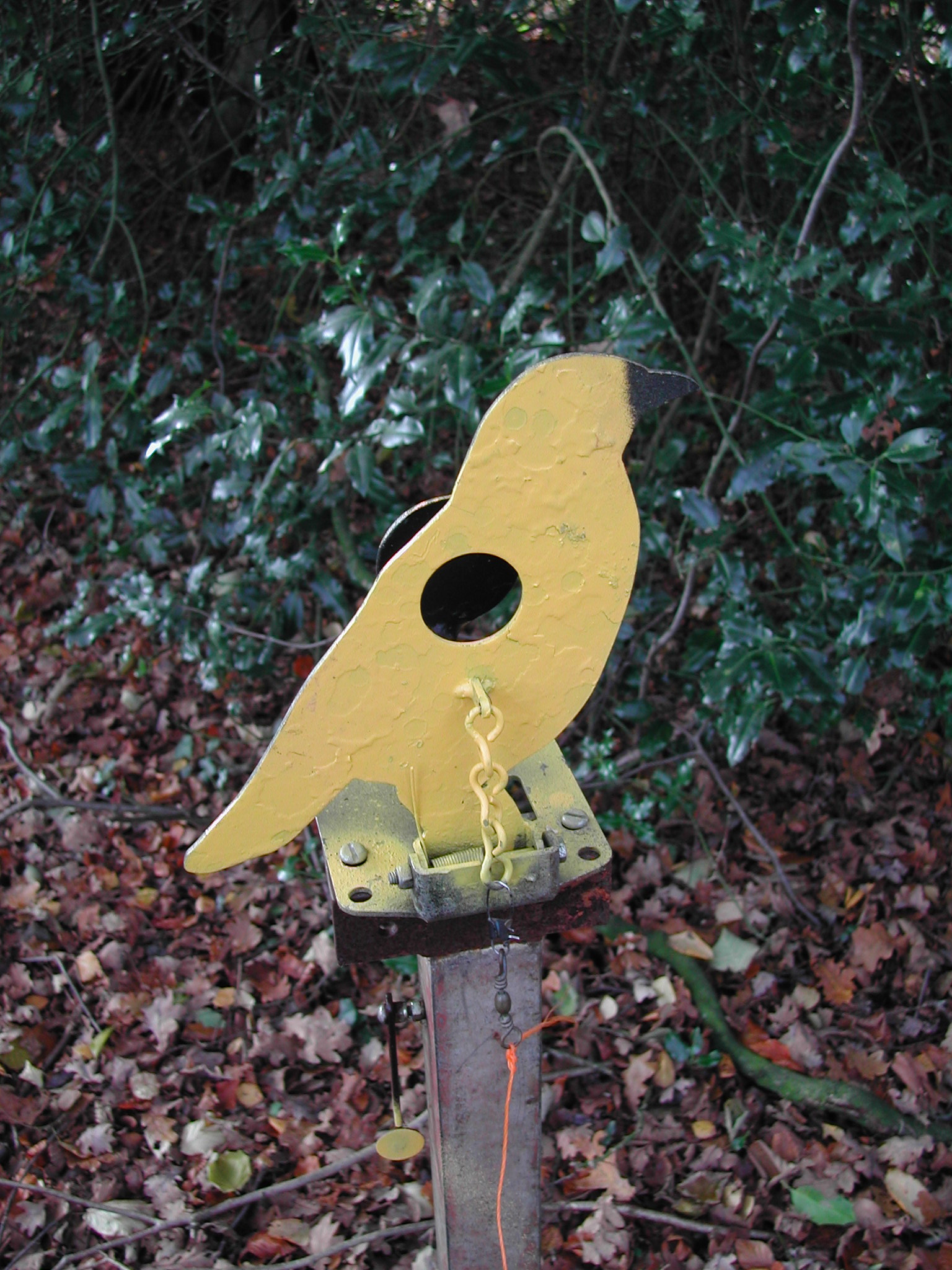
A typical field target competition target painted in contrasting colours, with a 40 mm hit zone and orange reset cord

Hunter field target (HFT) is a target shooting sport which started as an off-shoot of the Field Target shooting discipline. It is mainly an outdoor sport practiced with air rifles equipped with optical sights. The rifles have a maximum energy of 16.3 J (12.0 ft⋅lbf).

A typical competition consists of 30 targets placed at unknown distances to the shooter between 8 and 42 m (8.7 and 45.9 yd). Each target lane consists of a peg, as well as a metal knock-down target. The peg marks the point of fire, and while firing the shooter must touch the peg with either a part of their body or rifle. The time starts as soon as the shooter touches the peg.

During the competition, shooters are not allowed to use supplementary technology, they may not adjust the zoom of the scope, adjust their scope turrets or use any other tools to detect the angle of the rifle and distance to the targets.

There are three official shooting positions in the hunter field target:

- Standing position
- Kneeling position
- Prone position

Hunter field target is normally practiced in wooded areas or open countryside and in any weather conditions.

== Equipment ==
A typical HFT rifle set-up consists of an air rifle fitted with a telescopic sight. The rifle can vary from the very basic break-barrel spring-powered rifle to the most advanced electronic recoil-less pre-charged pneumatic (PCP) rifle. The most popular calibre for HFT is 4.5 mm (.177 inches) because of its flat trajectory, and telescopic sights capable of 10× magnification are favored. The maximum output power of the rifle must be limited to 16.3 joule.

Participants in HFT competitions may compete in different categories, typically Open, Recoiling,.22, Veterans, Ladies & Juniors.

Class	Description
Open	Any shooter. Primarily contains shooters using pre-charged pneumatic rifles (PCP) in 4.5 or 5.5 mm (0.177 or 0.217 in) calibre.
Junior	Shooters aged between 9 and 16 years. (Sometimes further divided into separate classes for 9-13 and 14-16 years).
Recoiling	Spring-powered or gas-ram air rifles (any calibre).
22	Any rifle in 5.6 or 6.4 mm (.22 or .25 in) calibre.
