= BFTA =

BFTA may refer to:

- Baltic Free Trade Area, a former free trade agreement, between 1994 and 2004
- Bradshaw Field Training Area, an area used for training by the Australian Army
- British Field Target Association, the governing body of field target shooting in England, Scotland and Wales
