= Winchester Hotchkiss =

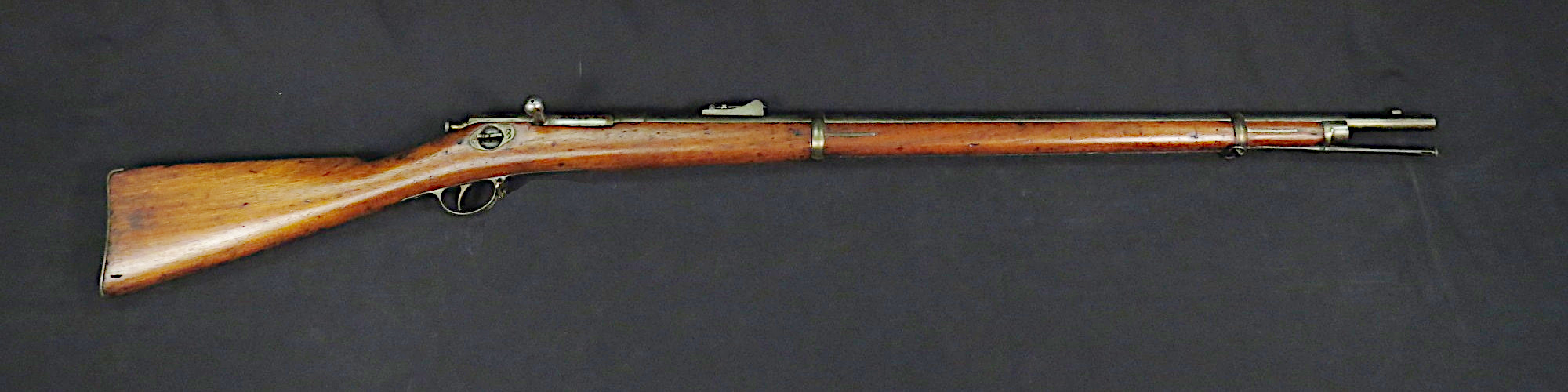
- Type: Service rifle
- Place of origin: United States

Service history
- Used by: Chinese Empire; Costa Rica; Mexico; United States Army; United States Navy; Various US state militias

Production history
- Designer: Benjamin B. Hotchkiss
- Designed: 1876
- Manufacturer: Winchester Repeating Arms Company; Springfield Armory
- Produced: 1878
- Variants: M1879; M1883

Specifications
- Barrel length: 28.75 inches (73.0 cm) or 32.25 inches (81.9 cm)
- Cartridge: .45-70 Government, .43 Spanish
- Action: Bolt-action repeating rifle
- Feed system: Tubular buttstock magazine

The Winchester Hotchkiss was a bolt-action repeating rifle patented by Benjamin B. Hotchkiss in 1876 and produced by the Winchester Repeating Arms Company and Springfield Armory from 1878. The Hotchkiss, like most early bolt-actions, had a single rear locking lug integral with the bolt handle, but was unique in feeding multiple rounds from a tubular buttstock magazine similar to the Spencer rifle. The .45-70 Hotchkiss was acquired in limited numbers by the US Navy as the M1879, and (in a slightly modified version) by the US Army and several state militias as the M1883, making it the first center-fire bolt-action repeater to be adopted by any major military (the distinction of first bolt-action repeating rifle to be issued in great numbers as a standard military arm was the Swiss Vetterli 1869, which utilized very large rim-fire metallic cartridges).

== United States military history ==
A joint production program was undertaken after the Winchester design passed United States Army Ordnance Department tests in 1878. Springfield Armory was to assemble rifles from Winchester actions and hardware with barrels and stocks manufactured at the armory. Sights, cleaning rods, and stock hardware were nearly identical to contemporary production for the single-shot "trapdoor" Springfield Model 1873. The Army ordered 513 Hotchkiss First Model Rifles for infantry units stationed on the western frontier including Texas and Fort Abraham Lincoln in the Dakota Territory. The first large delivery of contract material from Winchester to Springfield, in June 1879, included 498 sets of rifle parts, and two complete "pattern" arms assembled (actually converted from commercial muskets) at New Haven by Winchester using Springfield parts, in the reverse scenario. Serial numbers of the two assembled rifles were 101 (in a private collection) and 162 (in the Springfield Armory Museum). Springfield subsequently modified 501 of these rifles to First Model and Second Model Carbines for testing by cavalry units. Carbines have a shorter barrel and stock, and the rear sight is marked HC for Hotchkiss Carbine. The United States Navy ordered 1,474 First Model Rifles with 28.75 inches (73.0 cm) barrels rather than the 32.25 inches (81.9 cm) barrels on Army rifles.

Hotchkiss First Model Rifles are identified by the circular knob safety and magazine cutoff on the right side of the stock. The knob weakened the stock and was replaced by two levers atop the receiver on Hotchkiss Second Model Rifles. The Navy purchased 999 Second Model Rifles in 1880 and 1881; and Springfield Armory converted most of the Army First Model Rifles to Second Model Carbines. A few rifles were manufactured for the Army with two piece stocks variously identified as the Model of 1883 or Third Model Hotchkiss Rifles. Army Hotchkiss rifles were withdrawn from service after the Springfield Model 1873 was judged superior to the Hotchkiss in 1883 field trials; but the Navy rifles remained in service until replaced by the M1895 Lee Navy.

== Other production ==
The Chinese Empire purchased 15,000 Winchester-Hotchkiss rifles in 1881. Many of these rifles were also used by the Boxers in the Boxer Rebellion.

Between 1881 and 1887, the Mexican army purchased enough Model 1879 Winchester Hotchkiss rifles to equip two regiments of elite cavalry and the Presidential guard; those were chambered in the .43 Spanish cartridge. In 1888 the Mexican government purchased a 100 Model 1883 Winchester Hotchkiss rifles

In the 1880s, Costa Rica purchased a small quantity of Winchester-Hotchkisss M1880 rifles and carbines chambered in 43 Spanish.

Winchester also produced a civilian sporting version of the Hotchkiss, likewise in caliber .45-70 Government, until 1899.

1884 Winchester catalog lists an option to chamber the M1883 in ".40-65 Hotchkiss" cartridge (which may or may not be .40-65 Winchester introduced in 1887), but it's not clear if this variant was ever actually produced.
