= Thompson/Center Ugalde =

Ammunition cartridge family

The Thompson/Center Ugalde, or TCU family of wildcat cartridges, was developed by Wes Ugalde of Fallon, Nevada, by necking up .223 Remington brass to accept larger bullets. The cartridges were developed for the Thompson Center Arms Contender single shot pistol, and are widely used in handgun metallic silhouette competition and handgun hunting.

== History and motivation ==
The Contender pistol, with its break action, provides a very versatile platform for experimenting with cartridges, since all that is needed to change calibers is to change barrels. While not as strong as bolt action designs, such as the Remington XP-100, the Contender is capable of handling medium power cartridges, and many wildcats appeared based on cartridges such as the .30-30 Winchester and the .223 Remington. The TCU family is formed by necking up the .223 to the new diameter, and fire forming to reduce case taper and increase shoulder angle. The 7 mm version first appeared around 1980, with the .25 caliber appearing in 1987. The larger calibers provide more downrange energy, and resist wind deflection better than the original .22 caliber (5.56mm) bullet, and the moderate case capacity of the .223 Remington works well in the short pistol barrels.

== Variants ==
The cartridges in the TCU family include:

- 6 mm TCU (.243 caliber)
- .25 Ugalde, also known as .25 TCU (6.35 mm)
- 6.5 mm TCU, also known as 6.5×45 mm (.264 caliber, really a 6.7 mm bullet)
- 7 mm TCU (.284 caliber)
- .30 TCU (.308 caliber)

== Popularity ==
The TCU family of cartridges is still going strong in competition, with top shooters at the 2007 IHMSA championship shooting 6.5 mm and 7 mm TCU from both Contenders and other pistols.

== Methodology ==
Generally, only new, unfired .223 Remington brass is used for handloading TCU cartridges to avoid the premature case neck splits that can occur when resizing previously-fired .223 Remington brass with TCU reloading dies. Done this way, TCU sized brass generally becomes as reliable for multiple reloadings as any other handgun cartridge case.
