= .40-65 Winchester =

Rifle cartridge

- Type: Rifle
- Place of origin: United States

Specifications
- Case type: Rimmed, straight
- Bullet diameter: .406 in (10.3 mm)
- Neck diameter: .423 in (10.7 mm)
- Shoulder diameter: .560 in (14.2 mm)
- Base diameter: .504 in (12.8 mm)
- Rim diameter: .604 in (15.3 mm)
- Case length: 2.1 in (53 mm)
- Overall length: 2.48 in (63 mm)
- Rifling twist: 1:20 in (510 mm) to 1:26 in (660 mm)
- Primer type: large rifle

Ballistic performance
| Bullet mass/type | Velocity | Energy |
|---|---|---|
| 260 gr (17 g) | 1,500 ft/s (460 m/s) | 1,308 ft⋅lbf (1,773 J) |
| 260 gr (17 g) | 1,720 ft/s (520 m/s) | 1,708 ft⋅lbf (2,316 J) |
| 260 gr (17 g) | 1,420 ft/s (430 m/s) | 1,165 ft⋅lbf (1,580 J) |
- Sources: Barnes & Amber

The .40-65 Winchester (also called the .40-65 Winchester and Marlin) was an American rifle cartridge.

Introduced in 1887 for the Winchester Model 1886, and available in Winchester single shots and in the Marlin Model 1895, it was "a further effort to put more steam" in repeating rifle cartridges. In the modern era, the cartridge has gained favor for metallic silhouette shooting and Black Powder Cartridge Rifle matches where it serves as a low-recoil alternative to the common 45–70.

It was commercially available in black and smokeless varieties until around 1935, and can be handloaded by reforming .45-70 brass.

== Nomenclature ==
The nomenclature of the period was based on several properties of the cartridge:

- .40: nominal caliber in inches: 0.40 inches (10.2 mm); actual caliber was .406 in ( mm)
- 65 : weight of propellant (black powder) charge, in grains: 65 grains (4.2 g)

== See also ==
- List of cartridges by caliber
- List of rifle cartridges
- Marlin Model 1895
- 10 mm caliber
