= Shooting sticks (weapon mount) =

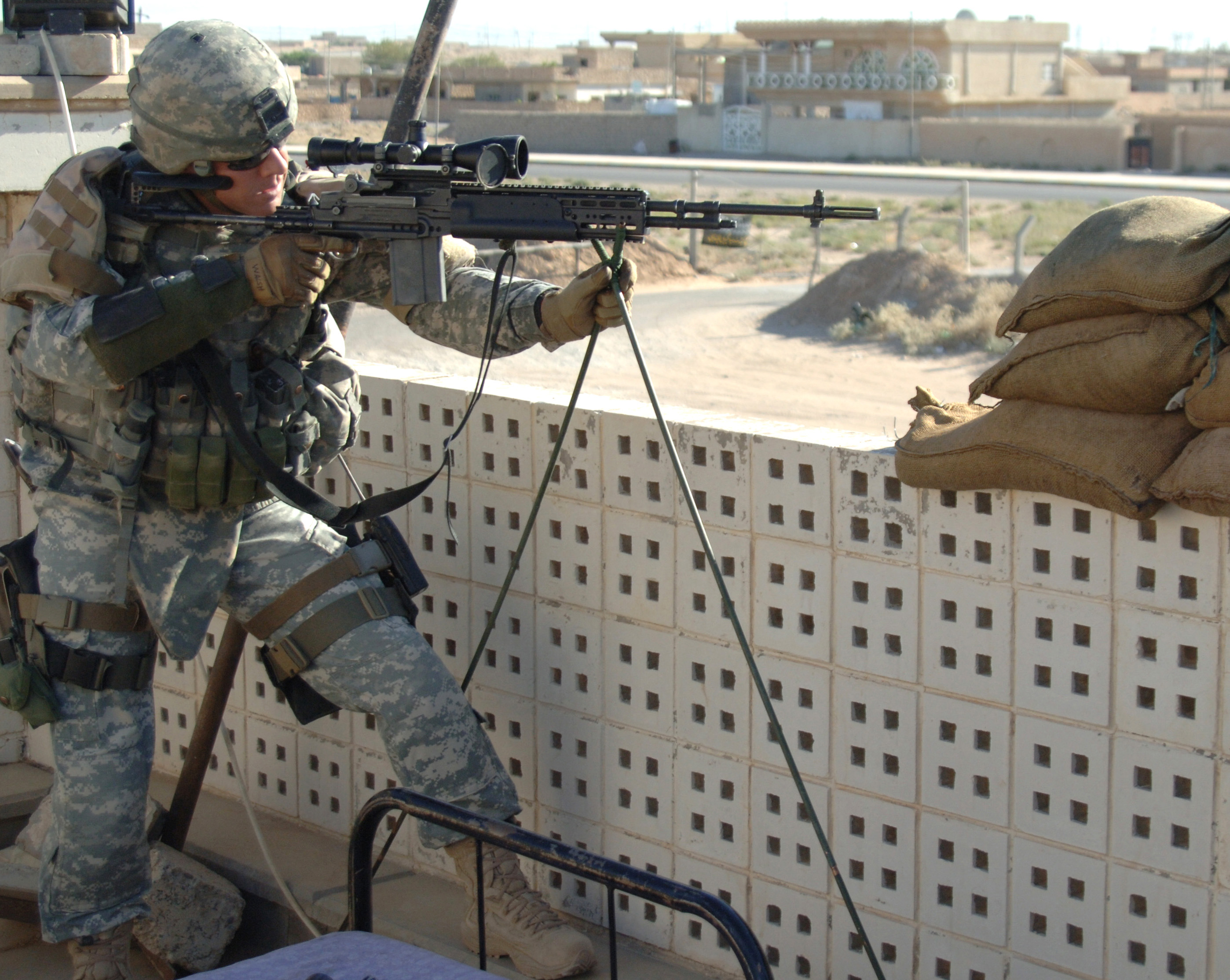
US Soldier using an M14 equipped with a Sage M14ALCS chassis stock resting on two-legged shooting sticks

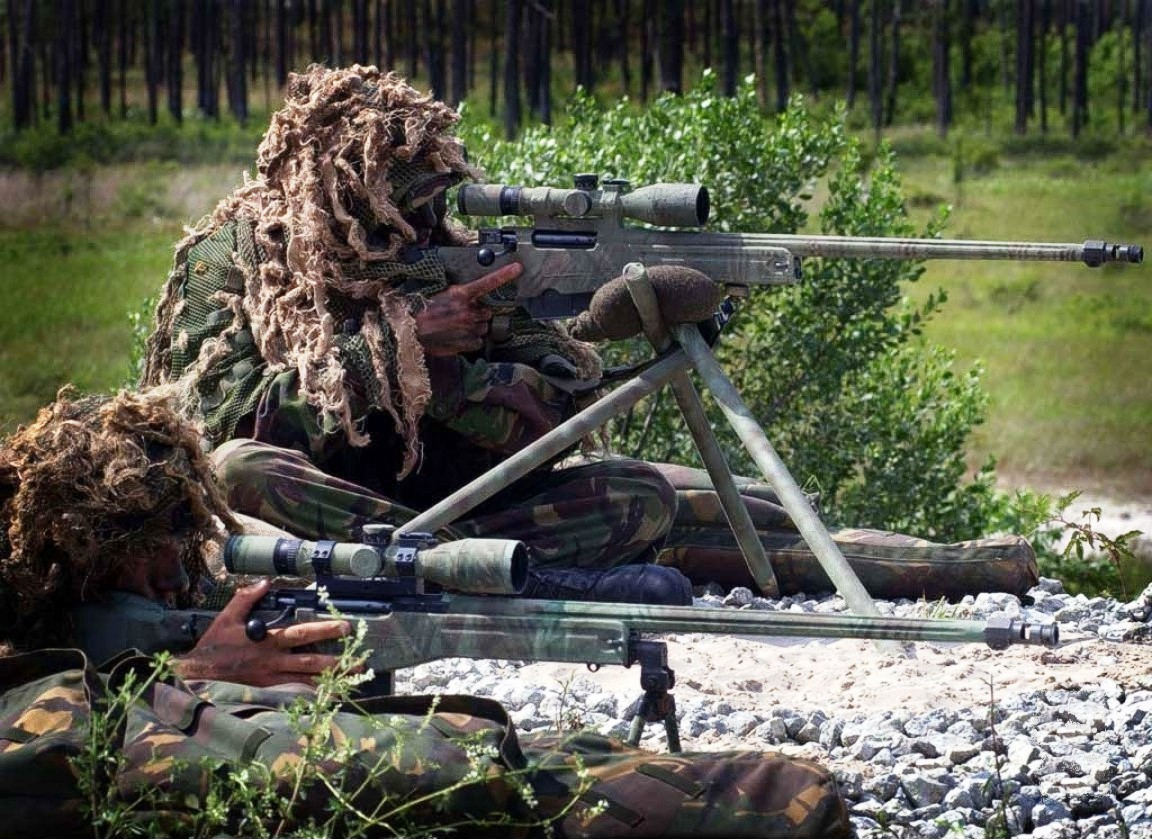
Royal Marines sniper displaying his L115A1 rifle resting on three-legged shooting sticks

Shooting sticks are portable weapon mounts commonly used with rifles to brace the weapon on the ground, walls, and other features of the local terrain in order to provide a stable resting position to shoot from; reducing user fatigue and increasing potential accuracy. They are popular with field shooters, such as hunters and snipers, and with metallic silhouette competition shooters using blackpowder rifles.

Like monopods, bipods, or tripods, shooting sticks can have one to three legs and be of fixed or adjustable length. However, unlike the aforementioned shooting aids, shooting sticks are not directly attached to the firearm and consequently many stick designs are multi-functional. Some can also serve as, for example, tent supports and trekking poles. Shooting sticks can be anything from homemade DIY solutions made from local vegetation to factory-manufactured commercial products made of carbon fiber.

== See also ==
- Monopod
- Bipod
- Tripod
