= British Field Target Association =

Governing body of field target shooting

The British Field Target Association (BFTA) is the governing body of field target shooting in England, Scotland and Wales.

== Management and Officers ==
The BFTA elects the positions of chairman, secretary and treasurer at its Annual General Meeting whom hold the position for a period of one year.

== Competitions ==
The BFTA runs several competitions throughout the year and maintains national gradings based on performance at nominated events.

- Grand Prix Series
- British Championships
- Inter-Regionals
- Masters & Showdown
- European Championships

== Grading ==
Shooters are graded on a rolling average of their previous 20 scores from national or regional Field Target events shot to BFTA rule and the grades are banded as follows:

- AA grade shooters are those with an average score of 85% or above.
- A grade shooters are those with an average score greater than or equal to 75% and less than 85%.
- B grade shooters are those with an average score greater than or equal to 65% and less than 75%.
- C grade is for shooters with an average score less than 65%.

A shooter may elect to be placed into a specific group above the one they are currently graded in, but can only move down as a result of regrading at the start or either the winter or summer season.

== Champions ==
=== Grand Prix Series ===
The GP series rankings are calculated by taking the scores achieved by each shooter in the series and dropping the lowest X scores (Dependent on number of GP's held in the season) and adding their GP percentage based score. There are champion across 6 categorisations of shooter AA, A, B, C, P and Open.

In 2014 the already shorter series was reduced by a further GP due to the after effects of Hurricane Bertha.

==== AA ====
Year	GP's Held	Counting GP's	Winner	Region	Final score
1987	?	?	Richard North	?	?
1988	?	?	Nick Jenkinson	SWEFTA	?
1989	?	?	Nick Jenkinson	SWEFTA	?
1990	?	?	Andy Taylor	?	?
1991	?	?	Nick Jenkinson	SWEFTA	?
1992	?	?	Nick Jenkinson	SWEFTA	?
1993	?	?	Nick Jenkinson	SWEFTA	?
1994	?	?	Tim Finley	?	?
1995	?	?	Mick Dakin	?	?
1996	?	?	Andy Calpin	NEFTA	?
1997	?	?	Tim Finley	?	?
1998	?	?	Martin Hutchinson	?	?
1999	?	?	Martin Hutchinson	?	?
2000	?	?	Martin Hutchinson	?	?
2001	?	?	Dave Baines	?	?
2002	?	?	Josh Garwood	?	?
2003	?	?	Stu Hancox	?	?
2004	?	?	James Woodhead	CSFTA	?
2005	?	?	James Osborne	MFTA	?
2006	?	?	Tim Finley	?	?
2007	?	?	James Osborne	MFTA	?
2008	?	?	James Osborne	MFTA	?
2009	?	?	Andrew Gillott	MFTA	?
2010	?	?	John Costello	NEFTA	?
2011	?	?	Neil Daniels	MFTA	?
2012	9	7	John Costello	NEFTA	581.2
2013	9	7	Andy Calpin	NEFTA	591.4
2014	6	4	Andy Calpin	NEFTA	391.41

==== A ====
Year	GP's Held	Counting GP's	Winner	Region	Final score
2012	9	7	Colin Richardson	FFTA	527.4
2013	9	7	Steve Wilson	NWFTA	525.6
2014	6	4	Chris Keyworth	WAFTA	366.0

==== B ====
Year	GP's Held	Counting GP's	Winner	Region	Final score
2012	9	7	Paul Dunwoody	NWFTA	522.9
2013	9	7	Robert Long	MFTA	491.8
2014	6	4	David Williams	WAFTA	352.1

==== C ====
Year	GP's Held	Counting GP's	Winner	Region	Final score
2012	9	7	Gary Fisher	MFTA	354.5
2013	9	7	Andrew Gough	MFTA	411.3
2014	6	4	Ian Burton	MFTA	287.3

==== P ====
Year	GP's Held	Counting GP's	Winner	Region	Final score
2012	9	7	Steve Privett	CSFTA	485.7
2013	9	7	Brian Samson	NEFTA	503.5
2014	6	4	Brian Samson	NEFTA	341.7

==== Open ====
Year	GP's Held	Counting GP's	Winner	Region	Final score
2012	9	7	Richard Baker	FFTA	437.2
2013	9	7	Ian Challis	SEFTA	590.9
2014	6	4	Ian Challis	SEFTA	400.0

== See also ==
- World Field Target Federation
