= Black powder cartridge rifle =

Black powder cartridge rifle (BPCR) refers to modern shooting sports which employ black powder cartridge rifles. These firearms, often of the type referred to as "buffalo rifles", are single-shot firearms using a fixed metallic cartridge containing black powder, which launch heavy projectiles at relatively low velocities.

== History ==
The sport was first formalized in 1985, in an NRA "Black powder cartridge rifle silhouette" match at the NRA Whittington Center in New Mexico. In 1987, a national championship was held, and also local clubs began to arrange matches.

== Equipment ==
The sport requires single-shot breech-loading cartridge rifles, such as were used in the United States in the late 1800s (NRA rules stipulate a type invented prior to 1896); replicas of the Sharps Rifle and Remington Rolling Block are widely popular. While cartridges as light at .38-55 Winchester are occasionally used, gunwriter Mike Venturino notes that "three black powder rounds have come to dominate the sport. In order of popularity they are .45-70, .40-65, and .45-90." The first being an "everyman's" round, the next for those who are averse to recoil, and the last for those willing to tolerate greater recoil to achieve more power.

These firearms are usually used to compete at relatively long-range (up to 1000 meters (1094 yards)), and generally with iron sights rather than telescopic sights (scopes). The challenge of the sport lies in the slow loading of the individual cartridge, and the low velocity resulting in a very arched trajectory.

Frequently, the targets at a BPCR match are silhouette targets: large steel cutouts in the shape of animals which often must be knocked to the ground for the hit to count.
