= Metallic silhouette shooting =

Target shooting discipline

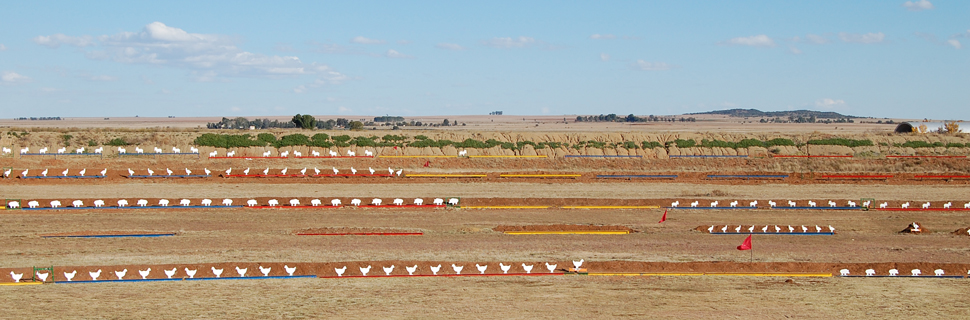
- Highest governing body: International Metallic Silhouette Shooting Union (IMSSU)

Characteristics
- Contact: No
- Team members: Yes
- Mixed-sex: Yes
- Type: Shooting sport
- Equipment: Pistol, revolver or rifle
- Venue: Shooting range

Presence
- Olympic: No
- World Championships: Yes
- Paralympic: No

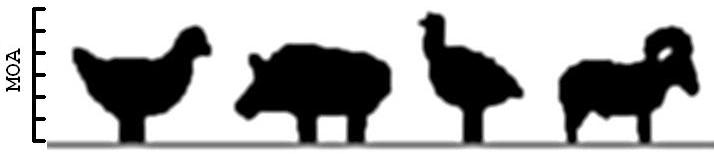
Target sizes of the chicken, pig, turkey, and ram targets, scaled to their angular sizes as they would appear if placed at the correct distances from the shooter during the fullbore rifle event with target heights of approximately 4-5 MOA (1.2-1.5 mrad). In the fullbore handgun event the angular target heights are approximately three to four times larger, or 12-20 MOA (3.5-5.6 mrad).

Metallic silhouette shooting is a group of target shooting disciplines that involves shooting at steel targets representing game animals at varying distances, seeking to knock the metal target over. Metallic silhouette is shot with large bore rifles fired freehand without support out to 500 meters, and with large bore handguns from the prone position with only body support out to 200 meters. Competitions are also held with airguns and black-powder firearms. A related genre is shot with bow and arrow, the metal targets being replaced with cardboard or foam. The targets used are rams, turkeys, pigs, and chickens, which are cut to different scales and set at certain distances from the shooter depending on the specific discipline.

== History ==
Metallic silhouette is descended from an old Mexican sport, dating back to the early 20th century, wherein live game animals were staked out at varying distances as targets. By 1948, metal cutouts of the animals were used instead of live animals, birthing "siluetas metalicas." The first metallic silhouette match was held in Mexico City. Because of the sport's Mexican roots, in the United States the silhouettes are often referred to by terms from several varieties of American Spanish, namely gallina (chicken), jabali (pig), guajalote (turkey), and borrego (ram).

The first silhouette range constructed in the United States was in 1967 at Nogales, Arizona. Growth was steady until 1973, when the NRA became involved in the sport. By the mid-1980s it was the fastest-growing gun sport in the United States. It is a sport that appeals to hunters, plinkers, and serious target shooters without the financial barriers of some other competitive shooting sports. Jim Carmichel called it the "common ground on which to unite."

== Governing bodies ==
The International Metallic Silhouette Shooting Union (IMSSU) is the international federation controlling metallic silhouette competitions for both rifle and pistol. As of 2020, the IMSSU has 26 member regions.

=== North America ===
There are two major US-based bodies: The United States Metallic Silhouette Association (USMSA) covers all types of silhouette shooting in the United States, and the International Handgun Metallic Silhouette Association (IHMSA) covers only silhouette pistol shooting. There are some minor differences between the international IMSSU rules and those used in domestic competitions, but it is generally possible to compete in all with the same equipment. USMSA domestic competitions typically use the silhouette shooting rules developed by the National Rifle Association of America.

Silhouette shooting is growing in popularity in Canada. The Silhouette Rifle Association of Canada (SRAC) is the governing body for silhouette rifle shooting and sanctions the Canadian National Rifle Silhouette Championships hosted each year by one of the participating provincial silhouette associations. The Canadian Championship adheres to the U.S. NRA silhouette competition ruleset.

=== Europe ===
The European Metallic Silhouette Shooting Association (AETSM) (French name Association Européenne de Tir sur Silhouettes Métalliques) is the European regional body of the IMSSU. AETSM was founded in 1989 and was a founding member of IMSSU in 1992, after which it was incorporated into the newer organization. As of 2020, 17 European countries are represented by AETSM.

== Course of fire ==
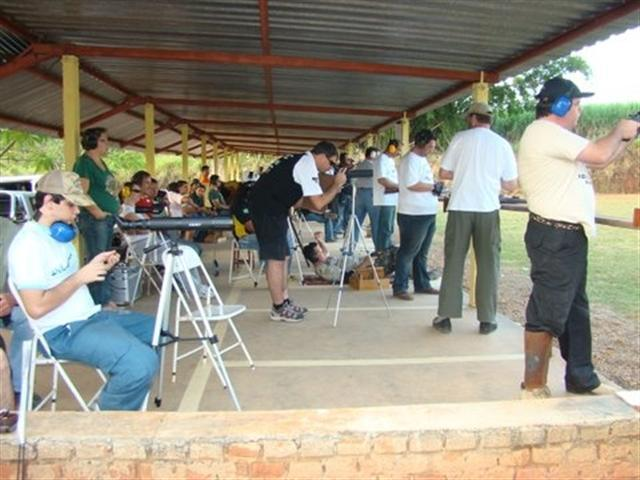
Metallic silhouette competition in Brazil, 2008.

Targets are set up in groups of five of each kind, with a silhouette's width between targets, laid out at the required distances for the given match. Each group of targets must be shot left to right; if a target is missed then the next shot is taken at the next target. Any target hit out of order is considered a miss. Targets are engaged in order of distance: chickens, pigs, turkeys, rams. The target must be knocked down or pushed off the target stand in order to score a hit; even a shot ricocheting off the ground in front of the target will count if it takes down the correct target. Shooters are allowed to have a spotter with them, who watches where the shots land and advises the shooter on corrections to make.

All disciplines require a minimum of 10 shots at each type of target, for a minimum of 40 shots per match; normal matches are 40, 60, 80, or 120 shots. To score a hit, the target must be knocked off its stand, so each cartridge used must provide sufficient momentum to knock the heavy metal targets over. Scores are recorded as the number of hits per rounds fired, so 30 hits with 40 shots is a score of 30x40=1200.

A tie can be broken in one of two ways: a sudden death shoot-off, used at all national and large regional competitions and for the overall match winner. Master Class and AAA shooters shoot at turkeys, AA Class shoot at rams, A Class shoot at chickens and B Class shoot at pigs. To save time and effort, a reverse animal count can also be used (number of hits on hardest animal to easiest), with whoever hits the most turkeys being the winner. If a tie still exists, whoever hit the most rams is the winner. This continues to chickens and finally pigs.

For IHMSA competition, tie scores are broken by either reverse animal count, or by shootoffs, as determined by the match director, however, for state, regional and international championships, shootoffs are used to determine the winners in all categories and classes. For reverse animal count, scores are compared starting at rams; the shooter with the most rams is the winner. This procedure is used sequentially down through turkeys, pigs and chickens. If a tie still exists, a shootoff is used to determine the winner. Shootoffs are in banks of five targets and can be any type or size, placed at any distance out to the maximum ram distance for the competition. Shooting strings continue until all ties are broken. Sudden death shootoffs are not allowed.

== Positions ==
Rifle silhouette shooters generally shoot from an unsupported standing position, though black-powder rifles may use shooting sticks in some competitions.

Handgunners may be required to shoot from an unsupported standing position (two hands may be used), or from a "freestyle" position. Freestyle includes some unusual positions, such as the Creedmore position, which is shot lying on the back, legs bent and feet flat on the ground, with the pistol resting on the shooter's right leg. In a freestyle position the pistol may only contact the shooter's body, no rests may be used (not even, in the case of the Creedmore position, the top of a boot).

There are informal matches for special classes, like cowboy rifles and pistols and vintage military surplus rifles.

All rifle shooting is done standing, with the firearm unsupported. The exception to this is black-powder rifles; the ranges are the same as large-bore rifles, but only chickens must be shot unsupported; all other targets may be shot from any position, including crossed sticks, a bench may not be used. Pistol shooting, unless in a designated standing event, can be shot from any unsupported position. Like the any-position pistol shooters, standing pistol shooters adopt odd positions in their quest for the most stable possible shooting position. Standing pistol is the most difficult discipline; no one has yet shot a perfect 40x40. Standing big-bore any-sight pistol matches are often tied with perfect scores, and decided by a tiebreaker.

== Target layouts ==
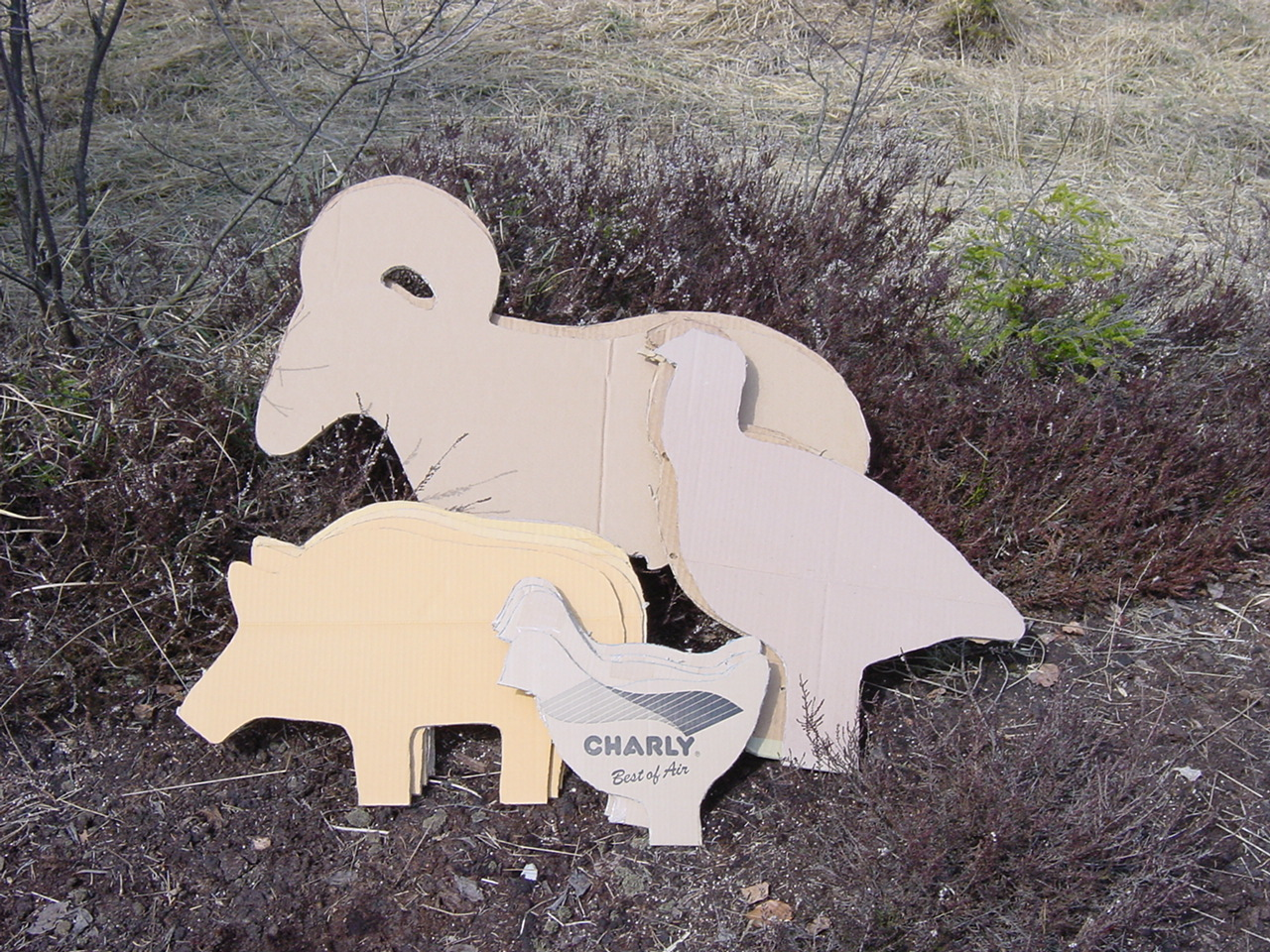
Cut cardboard targets of the same shape and sizes which are used for IMSSU metal targets in metallic silhouette shooting

Silhouette sizes
| | Chicken | Pig | Turkey | Ram |
|---|---|---|---|---|
| Width | 33 cm (13 in) | 56 cm (22 in) | 48 cm (19 in) | 81 cm (32 in) |
| Height | 28 cm (11 in) | 36 cm (14 in) | 58 cm (23 in) | 69 cm (27 in) |

To allow shooting at ranges which may not have space for a full target layout, NRA rules allow the use of reduced scale pigs, turkeys and rams placed at the same distance as chickens. The scale is reduced proportional to the change in distance, so the targets will cover the same angular distance as they would if set up at full range. Reduced scale matches fired at paper targets are also popular for informal competitions, especially for Internet-based matches where the shooters may reside in different countries. These are generally fired with rimfires or airguns.

Targets for large-bore use are 9.5 to 13 mm (3/8 to 1/2 in) thick hardened steel; small bore targets are 5 to 6 mm (3/16 to 1/4 in) steel, and airgun targets are 3 mm (1/8 in) steel, although some aluminum targets are produced.

Ranges are measured in meters only. The exception is the new IHMSA air pistol discipline, which is in yards only.

Standard ranges (always measured meters, except for airguns)
| Equipment | Chicken | Pig | Turkey | Ram | Scale |
|---|---|---|---|---|---|
| Large bore rifle | 200 m | 300 m | 385 m | 500 m | full |
| Small bore rifle | 40 m | 60 m | 77 m | 100 m | 1/5 |
| Air rifle | 20 m | 30 m | 36 m | 45 m | 1/10 |
| Cowboy rifle | 50 m | 100 m | 150 m | 200 m | Full |
| Cowboy pistol caliber and small bore | 40 m | 50 m | 75 m | 100 m | 1/2 |
| Large bore pistol | 50 m | 100 m | 150 m | 200 m | Full |
| Small bore pistol | 25 m | 50 m | 75 m | 100 m | 3/8 |
| Field pistol | 25 m | 50 m | 75 m | 100 m | 1/2 |
| Air pistol (yds. only) | 10 yd (9.1 m) | 12.5 yd (11.4 m) | 15 yd (14 m) | 18 yd (16 m) | 1/10 |

== Handgun categories ==
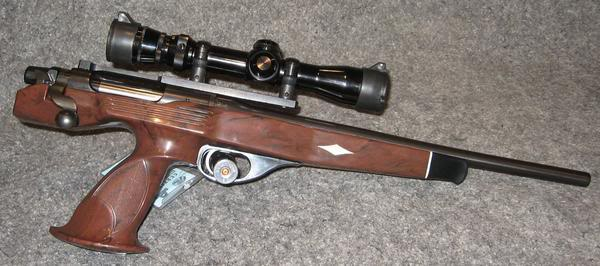
Remington XP-100.

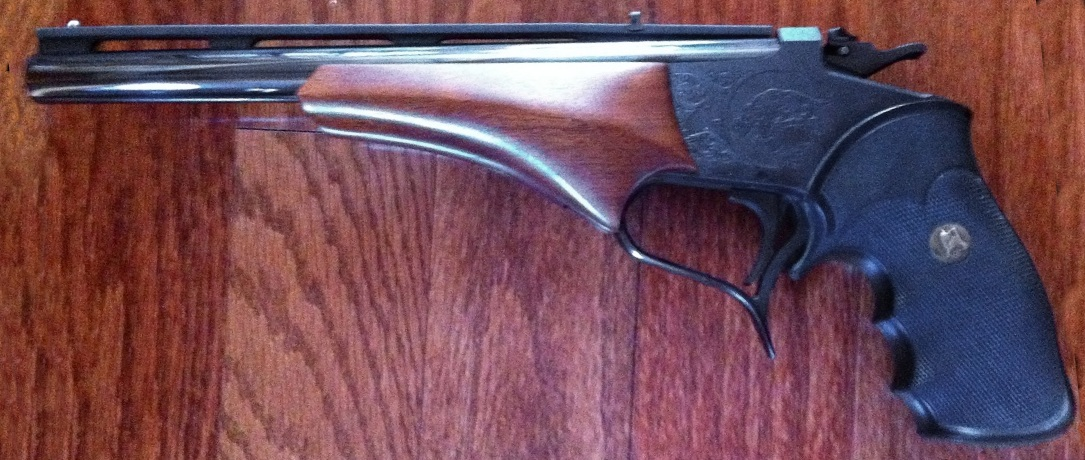
Thompson Contender.

Both bolt action and break action pistols are common in metallic silhouette shooting, as well as revolvers. Pistols usually either have a center grip or rear grip, and which is favored depends on shooting position and personal preference. Examples of pistols used for metallic silhouette shooting are the Remington XP-100, Thompson/Center Contender, Savage Striker and Tanfoglio Thor.

Metallic silhouette handguns most often have iron sights, although there are some national divisions where scope sights are used. Handgun scopes are usually rifle scopes with normal eye relief (especially for the standing position), but sometimes extended eye relief (EER) scopes are used (also called "scout" sights), especially when used for a lying position.

All long range handgun metallic silhouette events are fired with targets at the distances 50, 100, 150 and 200 meters.

=== International handgun categories ===
The four international fullbore handgun divisions sanctioned by IMSSU are: Unlimited, Production, Standing, and Revolver.

IMSSU Unlimited
Iron sighted pistols and revolvers with a maximum barrel length and sight radius of 381 mm (15 in), and a maximum weight of 2,041 g (4.5 lb). The sight radius is measured from the rear of the sight blade to the highest portion of the from sight. The overall length of the firearm can no more than 635 mm (25 in). The bullet diameter must be minimum 6 mm (.240"). The shooting position is freestyle, and most opt to shoot lying. The iron sights are usually open, but diopter and hooded sights are also permitted. Muzzle brakes are not permitted. Revolvers are uncommon due to a having a higher degree of difficulty, i.e. longer lock time. Examples of popular handguns for IMSSU Unlimited are the XP-100 and Thompson/Center Contender.

IMSSU Production
Stock iron sighted pistols and revolvers. The handgun model must be readily available, and modifications are not permitted as a rule of thumb. The maximum barrel length is 273 mm (11 in), the maximum sight radius is 342 mm (13 in), and the maximum weight is 1,814 g (4.0 lb). The overall length of the firearm can be no more than 406 mm (16 in) for pistols and 457 mm (18 in) for revolvers. Only open iron sights are permitted, and diopter sights are thus not permitted. The rulebook also further specifies any permitted modifications as well as accepted grip shapes. The shooting position is freestyle, and most opt to shoot lying. An example of a popular handguns for IMSSU Unlimited is the Thompson/Center Contender, as well as production bolt action pistols such as Loppo and Jalonen.

IMSSU Standing
Same technical rules as IMSSU Production. The only difference to IMSSU Production is that the class is shot from the standing position.

IMSSU Revolver
Only revolvers. Otherwise the class follows the same technical rules as IMSSU Production. The shooting position is freestyle, and most opt to shoot lying. Examples of popular revolvers include Ruger Single Six and Ruger Super Blackhawk, as well as models from Freedom Arms and Smith & Wesson.

IMSSU also has smallbore variations of the fullbore classes which follow the same rules, except that the only cartridges permitted are .22 Short, .22 Long, or .22 Long Rifle, that the target distances are halved, and that diopter sights are permitted in standing smallbore.

=== U.S. national handgun categories ===
As of 2020 most competitions in the U.S. are shot under NRA or IHMSA competition rules instead of using the international IMSSU rules, except for World Championships which are held according to IMSSU rules. The NRA rules lies closer to IMSSU, since NRA is the U.S. representative of IMSSU through the United States Metallic Silhouette Association (USMSA). The National Rifle Association of America (NRA) has a total of 7 categories, which can be divided into 3 Conventional categories and 4 Unlimited categories. IHMSA has a total of 8 categories, which can be divided into 3 Production categories and 5 Unlimited categories. The NRA Conventional and IHMSA Production categories are very similar, and the same can be said for the NRA Unlimited and IHMSA Unlimited categories. There are some minor differences and overlaps between the different three different competition rulesets, with the most important outlined below.

NRA Conventional Pistol and IHMSA Production classes

In the NRA Conventional and IHMSA Production classes, the handgun must be a stock, unmodified and readily available factory gun with a maximum barrel length of 273 mm (10 3/4 in). As a rule of thumb, bolt action pistols are not permitted in NRA Conventional, which excludes bolt action pistols and therefore makes revolver and break action pistols competitive. Bolt action pistols are however permitted in IHMSA Production, except in IHMSA Production Revolver which is restricted to revolvers. Other differences between the classes are listed in the table below:

| NRA Conventional Pistol, IHMSA Production | Freestyle position. *Similar to: IMSSU Production |
| NRA Conventional Standing, IHMSA Production Standing | Standing position. *Similar to: IMSSU Standing |
| NRA Conventional Revolver, IHMSA Production Revolver | Must use a revolver. Freestyle position. *Similar to: IMSSU Revolver |

NRA Unlimited and IHMSA Unlimited classes

The NRA Unlimited and IHMSA Unlimited classes permit any gun type (including bolt guns) with a maximum barrel length of 381 mm (15 in). Differences between the classes are listed in the table below:

| NRA Unlimited Full Size, IHMSA Unlimited Full Size | Iron sights only. The NRA weight limit is 2.0 kg (4.5 lb), while the IHMSA weight limit is 2.5 kg (5.5 lb). *Similar to: IMSSU Unlimited (2 kg) |
| NRA Unlimited Half Size, IHMSA Unlimited Half Size | Iron sights only. Targets are scaled to half size, but placed at the same distance. Freestyle position. Weight limit is 2.0 kg (4.5 lb) for both NRA and IHMSA. |
| IHMSA Unlimited Any Sight | Optical sights are permitted. Freestyle position. The NRA weight limit is 2.0 kg (4.5 lb) while the IHMSA weight limit is 2.5 kg (5.5 lb). |
| NRA Unlimited Standing, IHMSA Unlimited Standing | Optical sights are permitted. Standing position. Weight limit 2.5 kg (5.5 lb) for both NRA and IHMSA. |

== Rifle divisions ==
Metallic silhouette rifles most often have scope sights.

=== International divisions ===
IMSSU Silhouette Rifle
Also called High power silhouette rifle. A rifle, caliber 6 mm or larger, provided no belted cartridges or magnums are allowed. The maximum permitted weight is 4.6 kg (10 lb), including sights. Any sights may be used, whether telescopic or metallic. Scopes may not be more than 50 mm (2 in) above the rifle as measured from the top of the receiver to the underside of the scope tube, nor may the scope be offset from the top center line of the receiver (i.e. no canted sights). Any sighting device programmed to activate the firing mechanisms is prohibited. The stock must be traditionally styled and may not be bent or twisted so as to deviate from conventional configurations such as factory rifle stocks or silhouette stocks as manufactured by Fajen, McMillan, H-S Precision, and others. The barrel may be no longer than 760 mm (30 in). Exceptions to this in U.S. competitions include U.S. rifles in caliber .30 such as the M1, M14, and M1A. These rifles only may exceed the weight limit, and telescopic sights are not permitted on these rifles. The magazine of the M1A or M14 may not be used as a palm rest.

IMSSU Hunting Rifle
Also called High power hunting silhouette rifle. A hunting style rifle having a maximum weight of 4.1 kg (9 lb), including sights and if applicable, an empty magazine or clip. The intent is to describe a common hunting rifle. Caliber 6 mm or larger, provided that no belted cartridges or magnums are allowed. Sights can be any telescopic or metallic sight. Scopes may not be more than 38 mm (1.5 in) above the rifle. Exception: for rifles that eject the empty cartridge case straight up and that normally use an offset scope, the scope may be offset. Any sighting device programmed to activate the firing mechanism is prohibited. Stocks can be hunting style; thumbhole-type stocks are not permitted. Trigger pull can not be less than 910 g (2 lb). Rifles must be equipped with a functional safety, and all safety features must be functional. A hunting style contoured barrel that tapers from chamber to muzzle must be used, while bull barrels are not permitted. Factory tuners that do not act as a muzzle brake or compensator is permitted. Maximum barrel length is 660 mm (26 in), including tuner. Magazines may not be loaded with more than five rounds.

Anschutz is the manufacturer which totally dominates the smallbore silhouette rifle field. At the 2007 NRA Smallbore Rifle Silhouette National Championship 71% of all of the standard rifles were Anschutz rifles, 67% of the hunter rifles were Anschutz rifles.

IMSSU Silhouette Rifle Small Bore
Also called smallbore silhouette rifle. Identical to the description of the high power silhouette rifle, except that the rifles are chambered for only factory loaded .22 caliber (5.6 mm) short, long or long rifle rimfire cartridges. Hyper velocity rounds are not allowed.

IMSSU Hunting Rifle Small Bore
Also called smallbore hunting silhouette rifle. Identical to the description of the high power hunting silhouette rifle, except that the rifle may be a single-loading rifle, the weight may not exceed 3.9 kg (8.5 lb), the rifles are chambered for only factory loaded .22 caliber (5.6 mm) short, long or long rifle rimfire cartridges, and barrel tuners or additional weights are not permitted.

=== U.S National divisions ===
Competitions in the United States are held by the United States Metallic Silhouette Association (USMSA), which follow NRA rules in the U.S. and IMSSU rules in World Championships.

NRA Cowboy lever action silhouette
Any lever action center fire rifle .25 caliber (6.4 mm) or larger with a tubular magazine of original manufacturer or replica thereof. Only rimmed cases loaded with round or flat nosed bullets are used. Exception: .30 Remington and .35 Remington are allowed.

NRA Smallbore cowboy rifle silhouette
Any lever action, pump, or semi-auto rimfire rifle with a tubular magazine. Only .22 long rifle ammunition is allowed. Hyper velocity ammunition is prohibited.

NRA Pistol cartridge cowboy lever action silhouette
Any lever action rifle with a tubular magazine. Only rimmed pistol cartridges loaded with round or flat nosed bullets are used, i.e. .25-20 Winchester, .32-20 Winchester, .38 Special, .357 Magnum, .38-40 Winchester, .44 Special, .44-40 Winchester, .45 Colt, .22 Magnum, and .22 Long Rifle.

NRA High power semi-automatic military rifle
Any center fire, selfloading rifle, as issued for general service by the armed forces of any nation, or the same type and caliber of commercially manufactured rifle, having not less than 2,000 grams (4.5 lb) trigger pull, with standard type stock. In all courses, the standard box magazine is attached. Hinged butt plates, if installed, are only used in the folded position. Rubber recoil pads may be used. Gas systems, if any, are fully operational. External modifications are not allowed. The application of synthetic coatings, which includes those containing powdered metal, to the interior of the stock to improve bedding is authorized provided the coating does not interfere with the function or operation of safety features. The front and rear sights must be of original design, but may vary in dimensions of rear sight aperture and front sight blade. The internal parts of the rifle may be specially fitted and include alterations which will improve the functioning and accuracy of the arm, provided such alterations in no way interfere with the proper functioning of the safety devices as manufactured. (6 mm or larger caliber. Any magazine may be used and may be included in the grasp).

== Cartridges ==
=== Rifle silhouette cartridges ===
NRA rules for high power (silhouette and hunter) permit rifles in caliber 6 mm or larger, provided no belted cartridges or magnums are allowed. Common calibers can be thought of as in the deer hunting, target shooting and bench rest range. .243 Winchester, 6mm Remington, 6mm BR, .260 Remington, 6.5mm Creedmoor, 6.5×55mm, 6.5x47, 6.5 TCU, .270 Winchester, 7mm-08 Remington, 7mm BR Remington, 7mm TCU, 7x57mm, .30 TC, .308 Winchester, and .30-06 Springfield. The limiting factor is the balance between amount of recoil and the ability to retain enough energy to knock the rams over at 500 meters.

=== Handgun silhouette cartridges ===
Handgun cartridges aim to find a balance between comfortable recoil and being able to knock down the ram targets at 200 meters. Some common cartridges in Production are .357 Maximum, .300 Blackout, 7mm TCU, 7mm BR, .44 Magnum, .30-30 Winchester and .30 Herrett, while some common cartridges in Unlimited are 6mm BR, 7mm BR, 6mm TCU, 6,5mm TCU, 7mm TCU, 6×45 mm Rem and 6.5 mm Grendel.

== Other equipment ==
Ear protection and eye protection is mandatory. Spotting scopes and binoculars are commonly used. Gloves are only used for extra warmth when conditions require.

Many shooters prefer to have their own personal timer to show a countdown of the remaining time of a shooting period. To aid in sight adjustment, many use a notebook or other aid to show an overview of relevant ballistics. Any tools needed for sight adjustment should be brought along. Elbow pads are commonly used to reduce impact to the elbows against the ground and recoil. A leg garther is often used to store ammunition, and a blast shield (also called leg shield) is normally used, especially for revolver shooters due to the blast from the revolver cylinder. A carrier box or shooting box can be of great help for convenient transporting of the firearm from station to station on the range.

Clothing such as commercial-type trap and skeet vests (sleeveless) and shotgun shooting shirts are permitted as well as clothing normally suitable for existing climatic temperatures. Shooting coats, unnecessarily heavy clothing, or anything that would provide artificial support such as clothing having excess padding or stiffening material or which restricts or supports the body in the shooting position may not be worn. In black powder cartridge rifle competitions only period costumes are permitted.

== See also ==
- Bowling pin shooting
- Field target, similar sport for air guns
