= Field target =

Outdoor airgun field shooting sport

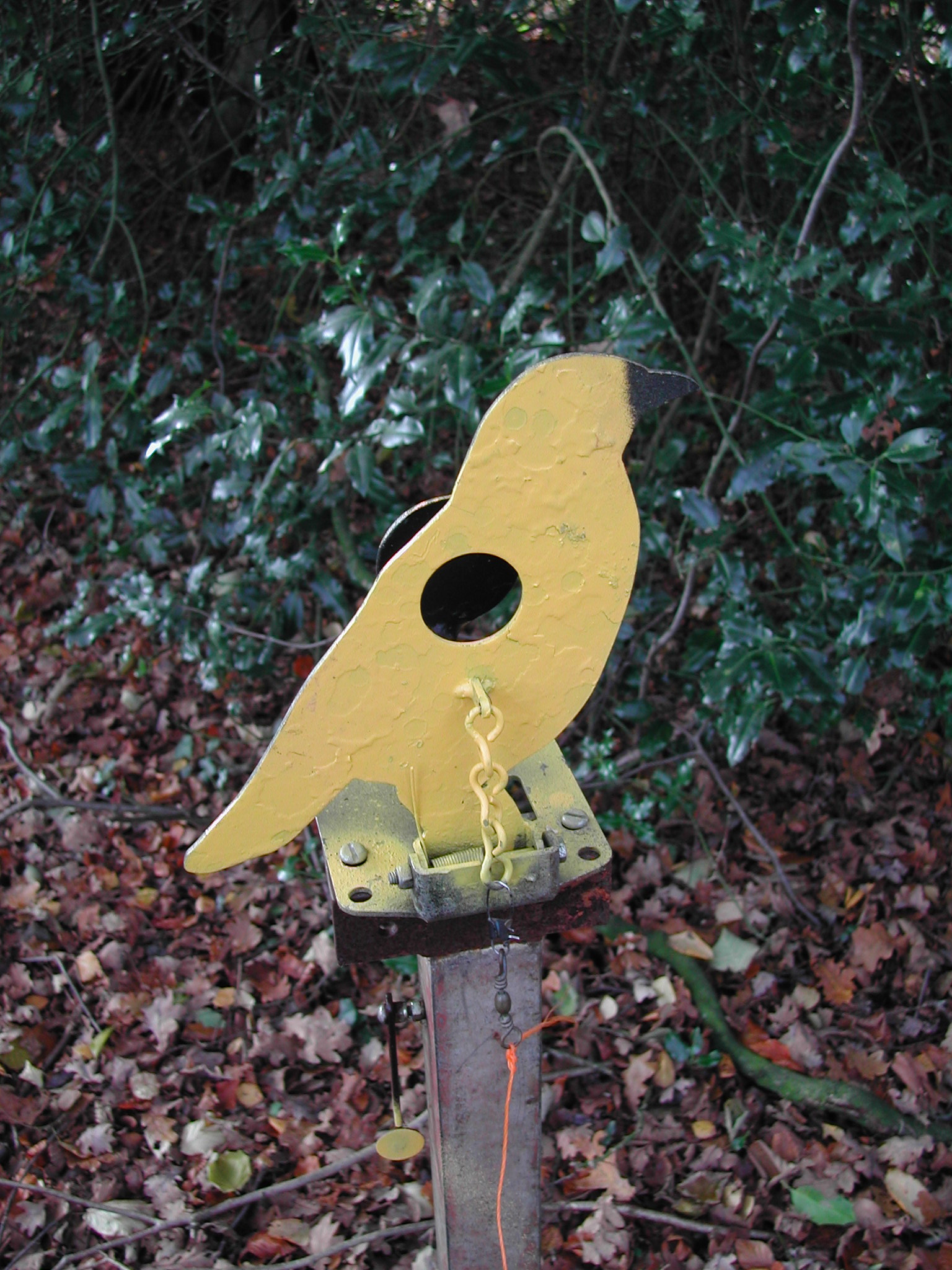
- A typical UK competition target painted in contrasting colours, with a 40 mm "kill" zone and orange reset cord
- Highest governing body: World Field Target Federation (WFTF)

Characteristics
- Contact: No
- Mixed-sex: Yes
- Equipment: Air rifle
- Venue: In the terrain

Presence
- Olympic: No
- World Championships: Yes
- Paralympic: No

Field target is an outdoor airgun field shooting sport. Competitions are usually fired at self indicating steel targets placed between 9 and 50 m (9.8 and 54.7 yd). There are two classes; Piston for spring-piston air guns, and PCP for pre-charged pneumatic air guns. In sanctioned competitions, the same competition rule set is used around most of the world. A small match can consist of 40 to 60 rounds, while the world championship consists of 150 rounds. It is common to use scope sights with high magnification and a short depth of field such that an adjustable parallax knob can be used to precisely determine the target distance. The target kill zones have three standardised sizes, which are 15 mm (placed between 12 and 23 m), 25 mm (placed between 7 and 37 m) or 40 mm (placed between 7 and 42 m).

== History ==
The sport originated by the National Air Rifle and Pistol Association in the United Kingdom in 1980, and spread to the USA during the mid-1980s. In 1987, the American Airgun Field Target Association (AAFTA) was formed. During this time, the competition rules differed between the two countries. The first Field Target World Championship was held in 1991 with athletes from the United States and Great Britain. The sport spread to Norway during the 1990s, and to Germany shortly after. In 2011, the World Field Target Federation (WFTF) consisted of 30 national member associations. As of 2020, WFTF consists of over 40 member associations.

== Equipment ==
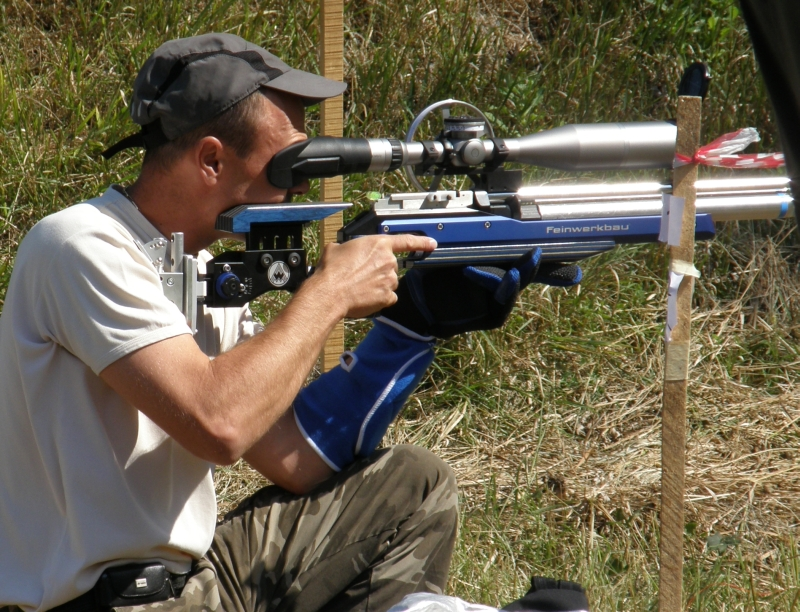

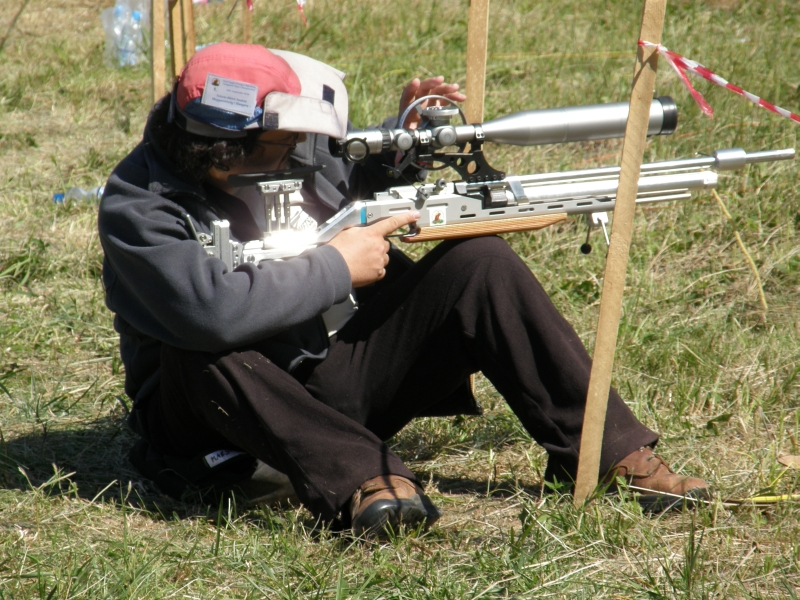

Pistols are far less common than rifles in FT, and they are shot in special events designed to accommodate the differences in shooting style.

In the UK, 0.177 inch (4.5 mm) caliber rifles are the most popular, as the higher velocity (relative to a .22" rifle of the same power) of the pellets means they fly with a flatter trajectory over the distances involved. One downside is that .177" pellets are very light and can be affected more by light crosswinds than the heavier pellets of a .22" (5.6 mm) rifle, in cases where .177 pellets and .22 pellets are traveling at the same initial muzzle velocity.

Pre-charged pneumatic (PCP) rifles are more popular than spring guns as the much lower recoil provides more confidence in aim for most people. There are some FT shooters who compete at very high levels with spring guns, and a well-engineered gun, shot with some skill will be no less accurate than a PCP. There are some "dedicated" FT designs available, with the main features being deep stocks or adjustable platforms ("hamsters") to rest on the knee while shooting seated, high or adjustable cheek-pieces to suit the large telescopic sights, and often adjustable butts or butt hooks. Many experienced shooters have chosen to use made-to-measure custom stocks for their rifles, and there are a small number of stockers in the UK who compete in FT and have a good understanding of the specific requirements of the sport.

Telescopic sights are favored for obvious reasons – it is impossible to see the kill zone of the furthest targets clearly with the naked eye. Another advantage of high-magnification scopes is their ability to act as simple range-finding tools. At very high magnifications, most scopes have very shallow depths of field, and one can accurately focus on a series of targets at known distances and mark the scope for future reference. In competition the focus is on the target and deducing the distance from the marks made on the scope's focus control. Some scopes use side-wheel parallax adjustments to control focus (rather than a camera-like focus ring on the objective bell of the scope), and this allows the use of large diameter wheels to increase the distance between range markings and effectively improve ranging resolution.

== Physics and technique ==
Pellets from a .177 inch rifle running near the UK legal limit of 16.27 joules (12 ft.lbf) will drop around 11 cm over 55 yards (50 m) – more than enough to miss the kill of a target completely – so it becomes necessary to compensate for range by adjusting the elevation of the barrel. Two common methods used are: moving the crosshairs above the center of the target by a lesser or greater degree (hold-over), often using markings on the reticle of the scope for reference, or adjusting a knob (turret) on the scope to drop the crosshairs onto the point of impact for a given range such that the pellet appears to go exactly where you point the gun (windage excepted). Competitors will often carry a small printed table of different ranges with their appropriate drop compensation or calibrate their elevation knob (often using an enlarged knob) – combined with the range-finding ability of the scopes, this allows for very accurate vertical placement of the pellets.

Wind presents probably the largest challenge for an FT shooter – while it is not too difficult to hit even the furthest targets on a perfectly still day with a little practice, mastering shooting in wind can take many years. Pellets can be blown sideways by even a light breeze. At longer distances this can start to cause misses, as the pellet will often be blown onto the faceplate if aimed centrally. In stronger winds it is not uncommon to have to aim completely off the faceplate in order to score a hit, and judging the amount of compensation to apply takes a lot of practice and experience. Head and tail winds can also have an effect on the trajectory of the pellets, causing them to hit high or low. It is common to fit a "windicator" to the barrel of the rifle – a piece of light cord with a feather on the end will provide a good indicator of general direction in light winds when it may not be entirely obvious, but it does not indicate what the wind will be doing on the way to the target. Competitors may choose to lift the reset cord of a target off the ground to get a feel for this wind – it will arc gently in a steady crosswind, and may even reveal changes in wind direction caused by nearby trees and foliage. Although many scopes have mechanical adjustment for horizontal offset, it is primarily used to ensure the rifle is shooting straight ahead in still conditions. The variable nature of the wind means it is often easier to aim off target (sometimes called "Kentucky windage" in the US) than to try to adjust the calibration of the crosshairs.

One measure of the difficulty of a field target shot is the Troyer (named after Brad Troyer). At its simplest, a Troyer is the distance to the target in yards divided by the kill zone diameter in inches. (This can be adjusted to meters/millimeters by multiplying by 2.32.) Thus, if a target is at 45 yds and the kill zone is 2 in, the difficulty is 45/2 or 22.5T. In practice, there are additional multipliers for various conditions such as targets over 45 yards, wind, "extremely" dark or bright conditions, standing or kneeling positions, and uphill or downhill shots. A typical course has a difficulty averaging about 25T with a spread of difficulties from as low as 10T to as high as 60T. A well-designed course can be used for all field target classes although the PCP shooters will typically outscore the piston shooters.

== UK rules ==
In the United Kingdom rules, competitors aim to shoot the small "kill" zone that forms part of a larger metal faceplate. These face plates are often shaped to resemble small game animals, although there is currently a move towards simple geometric shapes. On most competition targets, the kill zone forms the end of a short lever that tips the faceplate backwards when successfully hit. These targets have to be reset by tugging on a length of cord attached to the faceplate above the hinge.

Targets are shot from open "gates" in a firing line, and are divided into "lanes" of two targets each. Many competitions impose a time restriction of two minutes to shoot both targets after a competitor first looks through his or her sights.

Targets may be placed at any distance between 10 yards (9 m) and 55 yards (50.3 m) from the firing line. Targets are often placed at about the same height as the shooter, but it is not uncommon for them to appear high up banks or in trees, or down steep slopes.

The hit or "kill" zone of a target is always circular, and nominally 40 mm in diameter, although "reducer" targets as small as 25 mm diameter may be employed for seated shots up to 35 yards (32 m).15 mm kill zones at close range are also becoming popular. The targets are painted with the kill a contrasting color to aid visibility, although the paint is quickly removed by hits during competitions, making it harder to distinguish.

The majority of shots may be taken in any stance, but the seated position is the most popular due to its stability and often the need to see over logs or long grass that would preclude prone shooting. Most competitors carry a small beanbag or cushion to sit on while shooting and they are often used as a protective rest for guns while competitors wait their turn to shoot.

In competition, 20% of the lanes are designated as compulsory standing or kneeling, and there must be as even a split as possible between the two. Most competitions have 40 targets arranged in 20 lanes, so it is usual to have 2 standing lanes and 2 kneeling lanes. Grand Prix events have 25 lanes, so there are 2 lanes of one position and 3 of the other. Standing or kneeling targets must be no more than 45 yards (41 m) from the firing line.

Points are scored with 1 for a hit (resulting in the faceplate falling), and 0 for a miss (whether it strikes the surrounding faceplate, misses it, or "splits" on the edge of the kill but fails to down the target). The highest score of a competition forms the benchmark for all the other scores – they are calculated as a percentage of this score rather than the total number of targets.

Members of the British Field Target Association (BFTA) are graded according to their performance every six months. The average percentage score over this period determines which of the four grades is given – (in ascending order of skill) C, B, A and AA. Prizes at shoots are awarded by grade

== Rules in other countries ==
=== Argentina ===
In Argentina there is no limit to the power of an air rifle. Anyone can legally buy one with no age restriction. Field Target in Argentina is shot in two categories - PCP and Springer of up to 16.3 Joules (12 ft-lbf) for the "International" category and one national high power category "Argentina" for pneumatic weapons with muzzle energy of up to 40 Joules (29.5 ft-lbf) and springers from 19 Joules. Target are located at ranges from 9 m (9.84 yards) to 50 m (55 yards). Argentina has the AAFT ("Associacion Argentina de Field Target") which is a member of the World Field Target Federation.

=== Colombia ===
In Colombia there is no limit to the power limit of an air rifle. Anyone can legally buy one with no age restriction. Field Target in Colombia is shot in three categories - WFTF of up to 16.3 Joules (12 ft-lbf) for the "International" category and one national high power category "Open" for pneumatic weapons with muzzle energy of up to 40 Joules (29.5 ft-lbf) and Springers Category. Targets are located at ranges from 9 m (9.84 yards) to 50 m (55 yards). Colombia has the ACTP which is a member of the World Field Target Federation.

=== Estonia ===
Estonian Weapons Act stipulates that pneumatic weapons of a caliber of up to 4.5 mm (inclusive) and irrespective of muzzle energy are in unrestricted commerce for persons of at least 18 years of age. Field Target in Estonia is shot in two international categories - PCP and Springer of up to 16.3 Joules for PCP and spring/piston rifles accordingly - and in one national HP category for pneumatic weapons with muzzle energy of up to 27 Joules. WFTF Core Rules are followed as far as the European homologated Rulebook and ENFTA shooting rules permit it.

=== Germany ===
The weapon laws are very similar to the Hungarian laws, they also have separate categories for the 7.5 J (5.5 ft⋅lbf) rifles. They shoot only up to 25 meters but most of their killzones are 15 or 20 mm.

=== Hungary ===
The energy limit in Hungary is 7.5 joules (5.5 foot-pounds force), all air rifles above count as a firearm and the owner must have a licence in order to have one. There is no energy limit for these rifles by law but they are used at maximum 16.3 J (12.0 ft⋅lbf) according to the international and Hungarian competition rules. The competitors with 7.5 J energy rifles shoot in their own categories only up to 40 meters. The maximal distances for the different killzone diameters are: 20 m for 15 mm, 35 m for 25 mm and 50/40 m for the 40 mm kills. Positional shots (kneeling/standing) can have reduced size killzones, too.

=== Malta ===
In Malta, air rifles irrespective of their power are subject to a target shooting license. The sport actually began with no power limit as FT open competitions. In 2009 the governing body for FT in Malta was passed over to MAAC. It was decided to change the policy and keep national and grading competitions within the international FT power limit of 12 ftlbs. Shooters who take this sport on the competitive edge geared up and accepted this decision and for the 1st time in 2009 a team of 8 shooters attended the world championships in South Africa. However MAAC still organizes the "open competitions up to 20 ftlbs max" to attract airgun shooters to this sport. Minimum distance is 10 m and maximum distance is 50 m. Both calibers 0.177 and 0.22 can be used. Rules follow the core rules as originally designed by BFTA. Reducers were introduced in 2009 and follow the SAAFTA regulations for reducers. There are only variations in the shoot-off procedures for national competitions that qualify shooters for the worlds.

=== Netherlands ===
In the Netherlands there is no limit to the power of an air rifle. Anyone above the age of 18 can legally buy one.

However, in order to comply with the World Field Target Federation rules (as well as to limit damage to the targets), Field Target in the Netherlands is shot with rifles with a maximum muzzle energy of 16.3 Joule (12 ft-lbs).

=== New Zealand ===
In New Zealand there is no legal maximum power limit for ordinary air gun use, however a Firearm Licence is now required to possess any precharged air rifle

The general guideline is that the power of an Air Rifle used in a Field Target match must not damage the targets. All Field Target competition is "open class", and 12 ft⋅lbf (16 J) competitors participate in their own official "International" class, as do spring/piston air rifle competitors. Maximum/minimum distances are 10 m to 50 m. Membership of NZAFTA; the RGB to WFTF, consists of eight member clubs Nationally.

=== Norway ===
In the Norway there is no limit to the power of an air rifle. Anyone above the age of 18 can legally buy one, providing the caliber does not exceed .177" (4.5mm). Larger calibers require written approval from the police.

However, in order to comply with the World Field Target Federation rules (as well as to limit damage to the targets), Field Target in Norway (NFTAC events) are restricted to rifles producing a maximum muzzle energy of 16.3 Joule (12 ft-lbs).

=== Poland ===
In Poland the energy limit for air guns is 17 joules (air guns above this limit must be registered and may be used only on shooting ranges). Therefore, the PFTA (Polish Field Target Association) has adopted the British limit of 16.3 joules (12 ft⋅lbf) for competitions.

=== Spain ===
In Spain the maximum rifle power is the legal limit of 24.2 joules. This power allows the use of .22 caliber without problems. The range of the targets must be between 9 meters and 50 meters. "Kentucky windage" and scope adjustment are used.

=== Sweden ===
The energy limit for a license fre air gun in Sweden is 10 joules, hence there are three classes. National (10J), International (16.3J) and full power (45J, formerly unlimited but has been limited due to damages on the targets), the two later classes required a firearms licence.

=== United States ===
In the United States, the American Airgun Field Target Association (AAFTA) rules set a maximum rifle power of 20 ft·lbf (27 J) primarily to limit damage to targets — there are no laws limiting airgun power in the United States. Individual competition rules may impose limits on power and/or other criteria at the discretion of the local match director. The increased velocity of the pellets from these higher power rifles primarily reduces the effects of distance (pellet drop) and windage (time of flight determines wind effects) but the game is, otherwise, quite similar to that of Britain and other countries.

In the US, kill zone diameters vary from a minimum of 0.375 inches (9.525 mm), to a typical kill zone diameter at distance of 1-1/2 inches (3.81 cm). Occasionally, kill zones to the maximum allowed 2 inches (5.08 cm) are used. The ranges of the targets must be between 10 yards (9.1 m) and 55 yards (50.3 m), and they are arranged in lanes of 1 to 3 targets. Kneeling and standing shots are also the norm at every match but not as large a percentage of the match as in the UK. Hunter class has also started with a very strong following.

Precision shooting at such small targets lends itself to dialing in elevation adjustments and for the most part when shooting at high power 20 ft⋅lbf (27 J) Kentucky windage a bit less of a factor than with 12 ft⋅lbf (16 J) although time-of-flight is the primary factor for windage and, while the power of guns used may be lower, lighter pellets are also used in such guns and the speed of a pellet at the muzzle is only a bit slower (7.2 grains at 825 ft/s (251 m/s) versus 10.2 grains (0.66 g) 890 ft/s (270 m/s), for example). Hence, windage is a similar problem for those shooting at either power in most instances.

In recent years, a pistol version of Field Target has taken hold in the U.S. Limited to 12 ft·lbf (16 J), this game uses the same targets as the rifle game. A pistol game is shot at shorter ranges, from 10 yards (9.1 m) and 35 yards (32.004 m), at target kill zones from .5 inch (12.7 mm) to 2 inches (5.08 cm) in diameter.

== Sources ==
- British Field Target Association Rules Archived 2012-08-25 at the Wayback Machine
- AAFTA Field Target Primer by Joe McDaniel Archived 2009-01-06 at the Wayback Machine
- Canadian Airgun Field Target Association rules Archived 2011-12-16 at the Wayback Machine

https://web.archive.org/web/20130817163656/http://uksarc.org.uk/index.html

== See also ==
- World Field Target Federation
- Hunter Field Target
- 10 metre air rifle
- British Field Target Association
