= Steel target =

Shooting target made from hardened steel

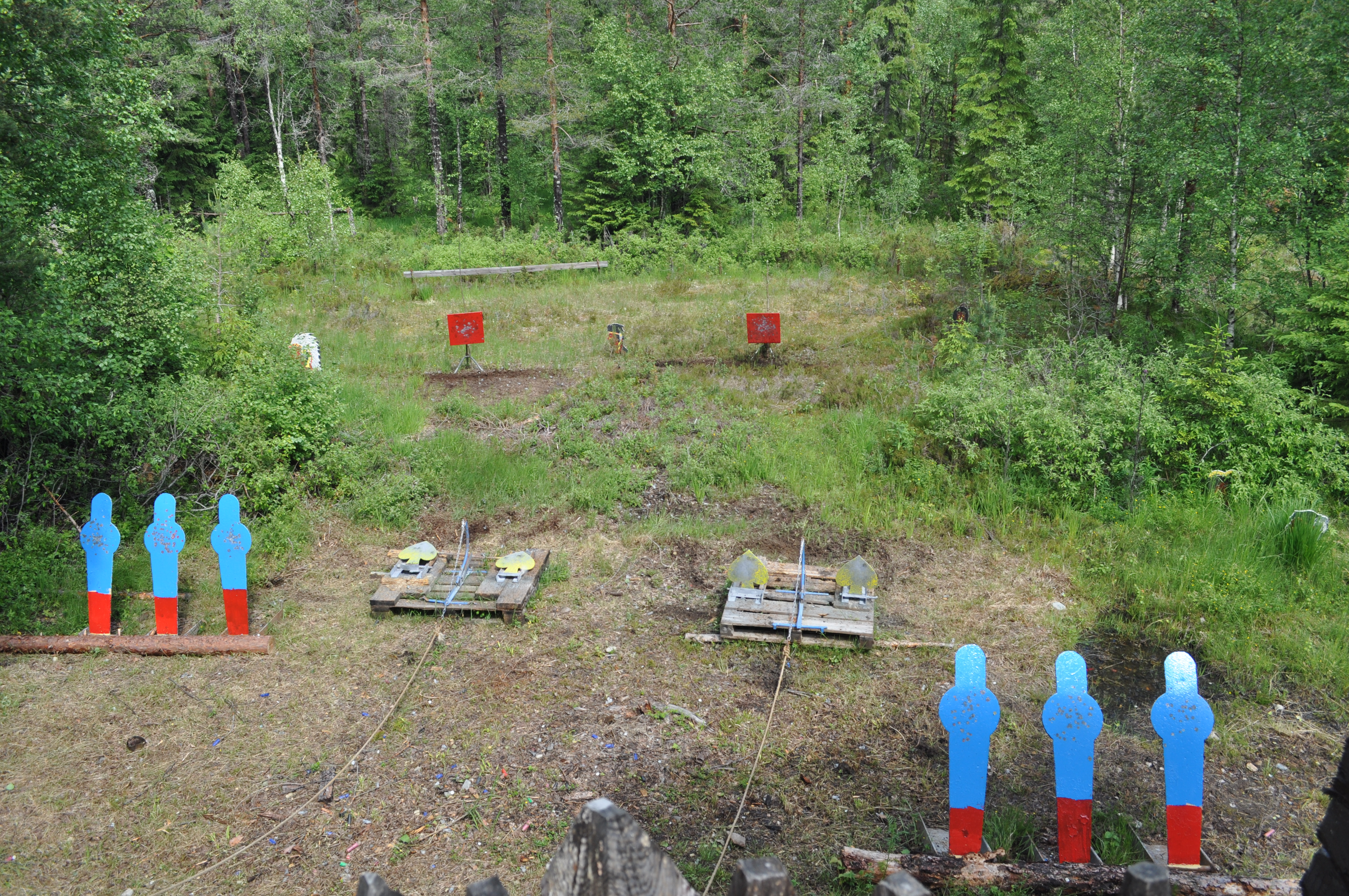
Steel targets used in cowboy action shooting

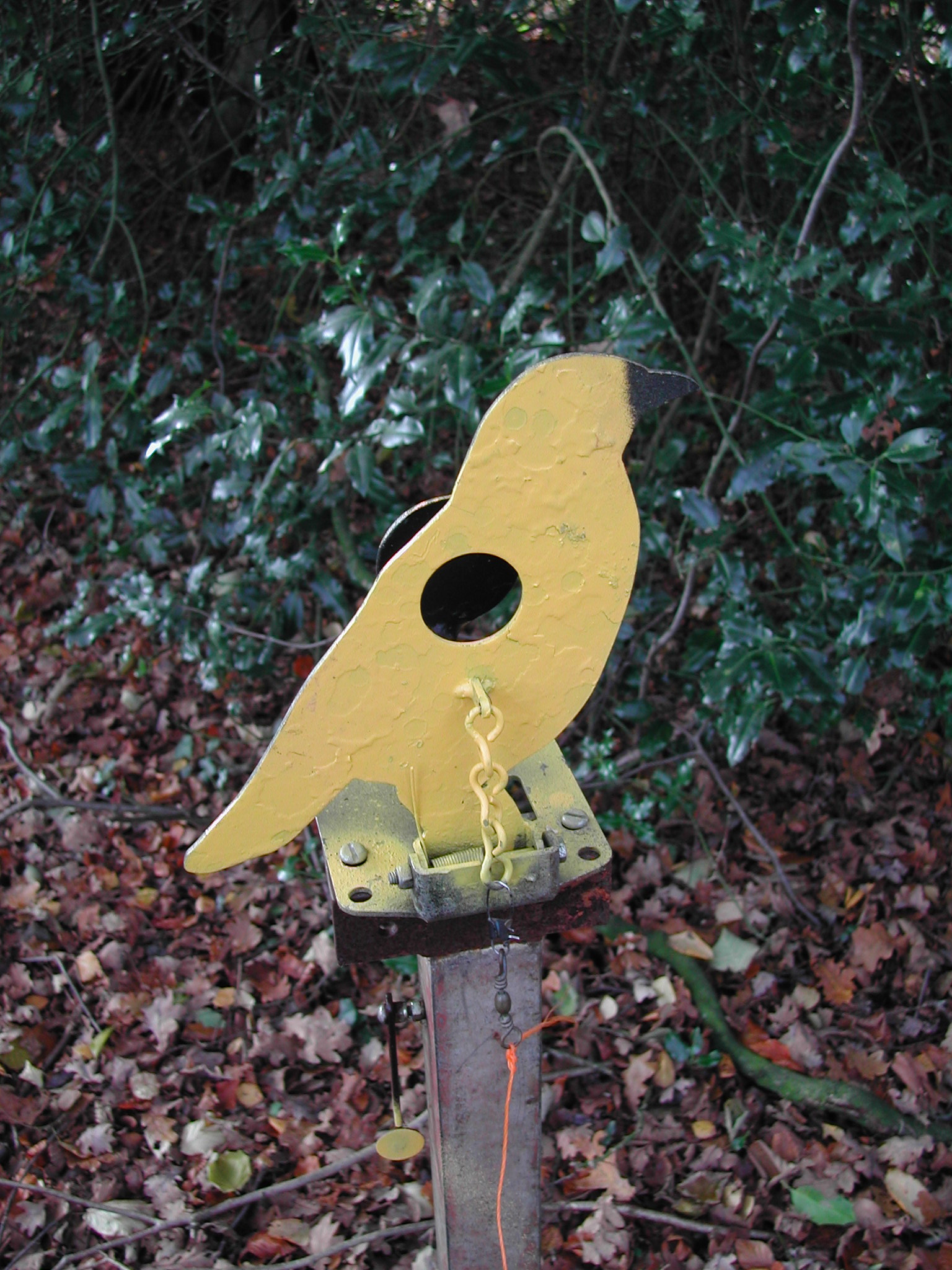
A smaller steel target used for airguns

Steel targets are shooting targets made out of hardened (martensitic) steel, and are used in firearm and airgun sports such as silhouette shooting, cowboy action shooting, practical/dynamic shooting, long range shooting and field target, as well as recreational plinking. They are popular in both training and competitions because the shooter gets instant acoustic feedback on a successful impact, and can often also visually confirm hits by seeing the bullet getting pulverized, leaving a mark on the surface paint, or moving/knocking down the target. Hanging steel plates (colloquially called "gongs") or self-resetting steel targets also have the advantage that the shooter does not need to go forward downrange to tape the targets, making it a good option for shooting ranges that otherwise have electronic targets. Steel targets also are weatherproof, contrary to paper targets, which do not hold up in rain and wind gusts.

== Precautions regarding ricochets ==
If correct precautions are taken, the chance of ricochets when shooting at steel targets are minimal. The materials of which both the target and bullets are constructed should be chosen to cause the bullets to pulverize on impact, and therefore hardened steel targets and regular lead core bullets or copper jacketed bullets should be used. Unhardened steel should be avoided for use in targets, and ammunition with armor-piercing properties (i.e. steel cores) should also be avoided.

Furthermore, it is important always to shoot steel targets at an angle in both vertical and horizontal direction so any ricochet immediately strikes the ground away from the shooter. This angling of the target also reduces distortion of the steel target and prolongs its lifetime. Localized heating, causing loss of hardness, is also reduced. Additionally, not mounting the targets solidly but allowing swinging or moving when shot reduces stress on impact. However, it has a downside in that shooters should only shoot at targets that are not moving to avoid accidentally reducing the angle of impact and thus possibly causing ricochets.

=== Target material ===
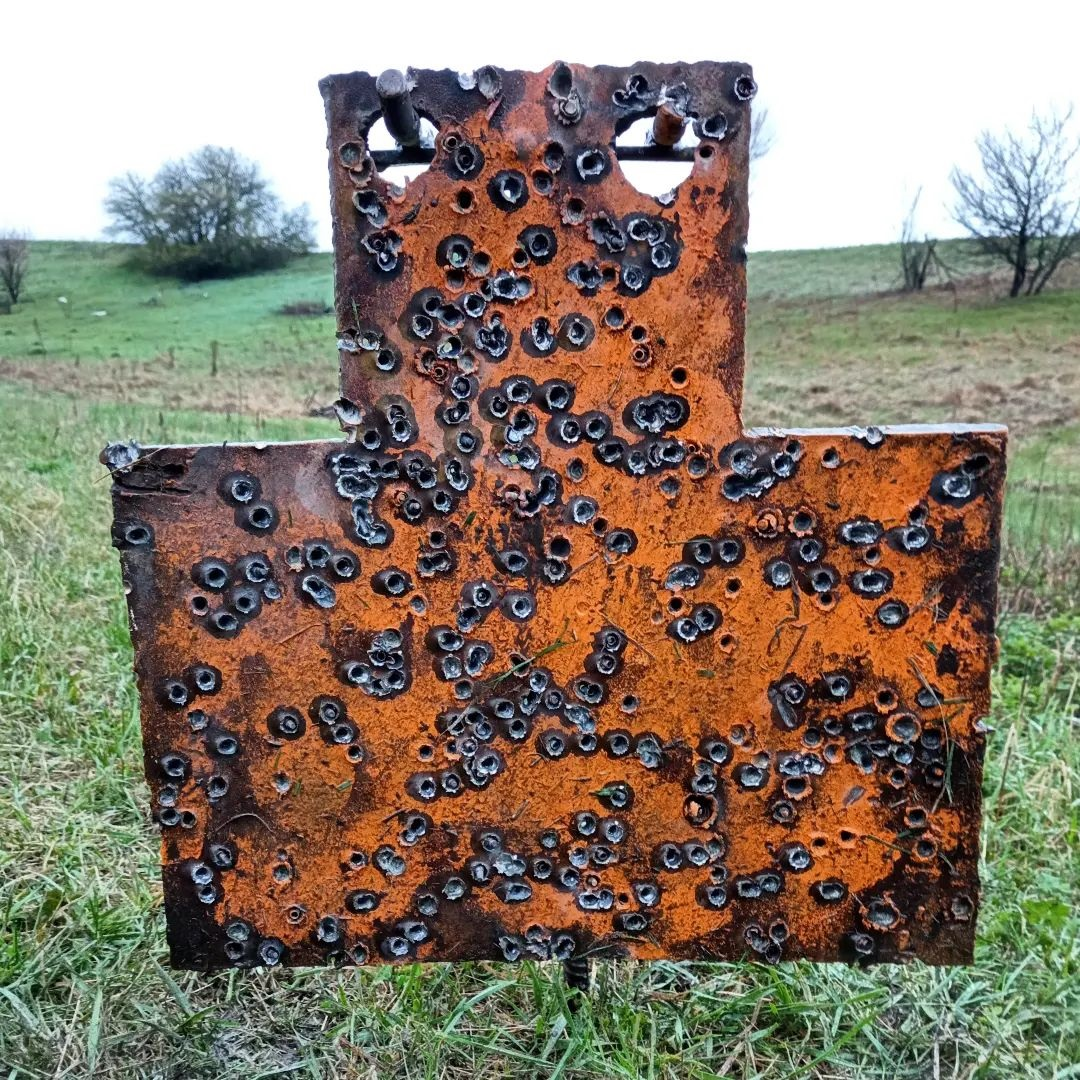
hanging gong from steel plate

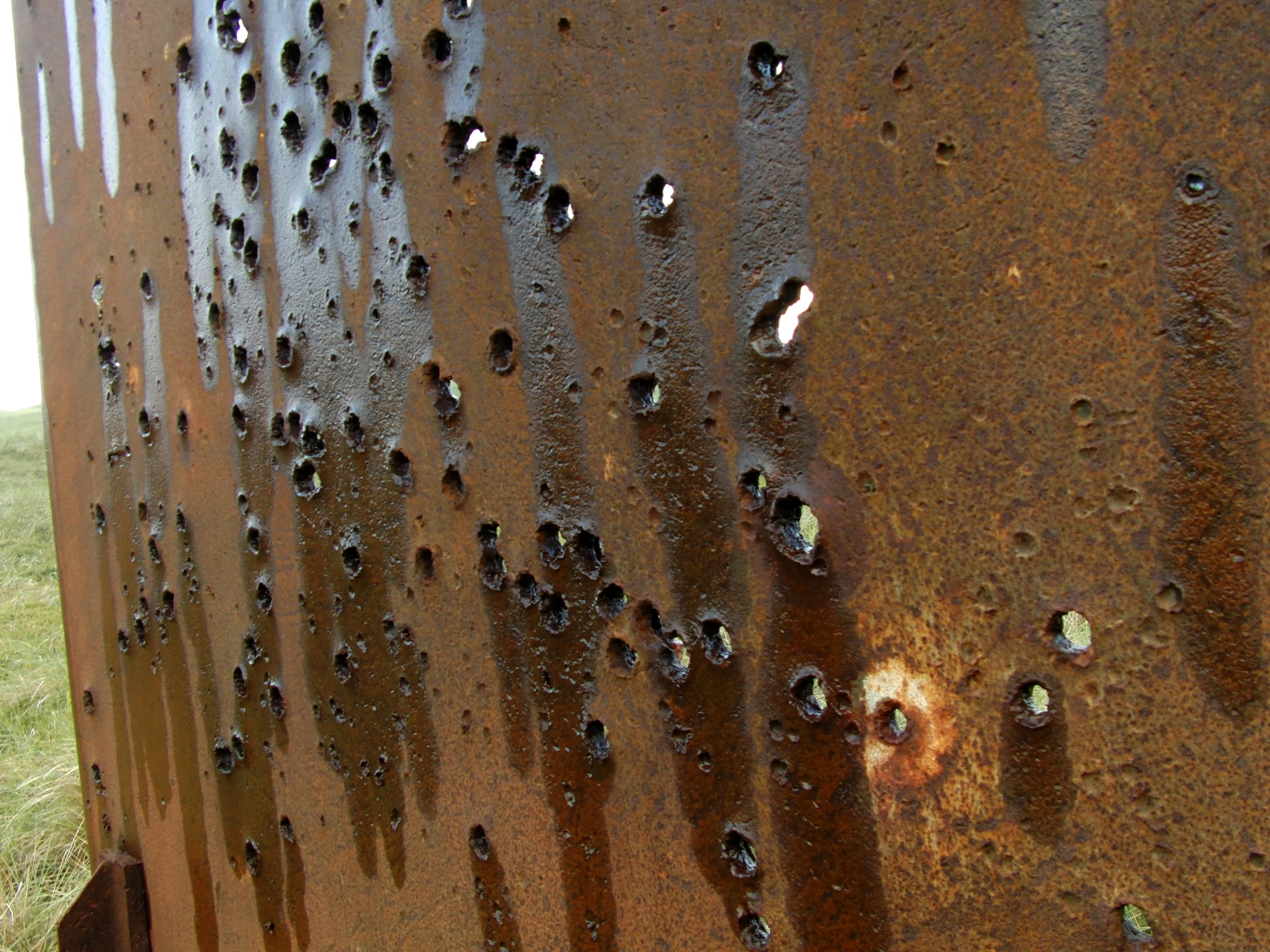
Steel targets made out of ordinary soft steel are quickly worn and are dangerous to use.

As a safety precaution, steel targets must be made out of hardened steel, which is more resistant to plastic deformation than regular, soft steel. For steel targets, the steel should have a Brinell value of 500 or slightly more. One American producer of steel targets claims to use only steel with a hardness greater than 500, most often between 515 and 540. They also claim that the steel gets too brittle if higher Brinell values are used. Hardened steel is available in different Brinell values or thicknesses, and stainless variants are also available. A common trademark in the United States for hardened steel is AR500.

Regular steel is too soft, resulting in bullets either punching through the target or making a crater whereupon subsequent bullets may bounce back toward the shooter or spectators, often with great force. Even thick plates quickly get holes and craters if they are made of regular steel.

==== Processing of the steel target ====
Many workshops have the tools to manufacture steel targets out of hardened steel, but it is important that it be done correctly. For instance, water jet cutters or laser cutters are preferred, but plasma cutters can be used. In contrast, angle grinders or normal welding damages the hardening. Hardened drill bits with floods of cooling medium, laser or water jets are needed to cut holes in hardened steel targets.

=== Thickness and distance to the target ===
The required thickness of the target depends on the distance intended for shooting, steel quality, caliber, bullet type, and bullet speed. High velocity rounds more easily penetrate steel targets, meaning that faster bullets even of relatively small calibers or diameter are more likely to punch through a target.

Manufacturers recommends at least 1/4" thickness (6.35 mm) with 500 Brinell value for pistol shooting with common calibres such as 9 mm, .40 S&W and .45 ACP, with a safety distance of 10 yards (approx. 10 m). For rifle shooting, manufacturers recommend at least 3/8" (9.525 mm) 500 Brinell steel, and different distances according to what caliber is used. For calibers like .223 and .308 at least 100 yards are required for long target life. For larger and faster calibers such as 22-250, 30-06, 300 Win Mag or .338 Lapua 200 yards or farther is recommended. Nevertheless, the targets can often been shot at from much closer without any problems, provided proper angles are maintained.

=== Bullet choice ===
Lead core or frangible bullets are preferred, since they are pulverized upon high-velocity impact, and the dust will then be spread out to the sides of the target. However, bullets with hard cores (like steel, or "bi-metal") are not pulverized and can either penetrate or ricochet, causing them to be potentially dangerous. Since lead isn't magnetic, competition organizers may use a magnet to check for the presence of a ferromagnetic core. Copper jacketed bullets work fine with steel targets, provided that minimal distance guidelines are followed.

== Fixing ==
Chains and shackles make the most sound and are the most popular methods for fixing hanging targets. Sections of old fire department hose are also popular, for reasons of longevity. Ropes are quickly torn, but another alternative that lasts for quite a long time are the inner tubes of tires.

== Competition use ==
=== Practical shooting ===
In practical shooting, administered by IPSC, both cardboard and steel targets are used. Standardized steel targets, called "poppers", are often used, but other forms and shapes can be used as long as they comply with the rules. The smallest sizes for respectively circular and square targets, both for rifle and pistols, are 15 cm Ø/ 15x15 cm, while the largest targets allowed for pistols are 30 cm Ø/ 30x30 cm and for rifles 30 cm Ø/ 45x30 cm.

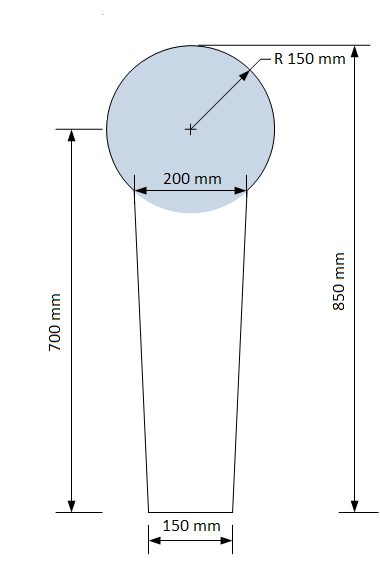
IPSC Popper (formerly known as the Classic Popper).

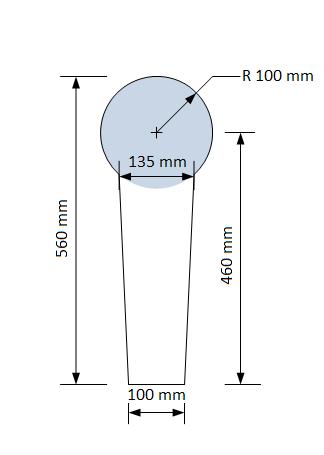
IPSC Mini Popper (formerly known as the Classic Mini Popper).

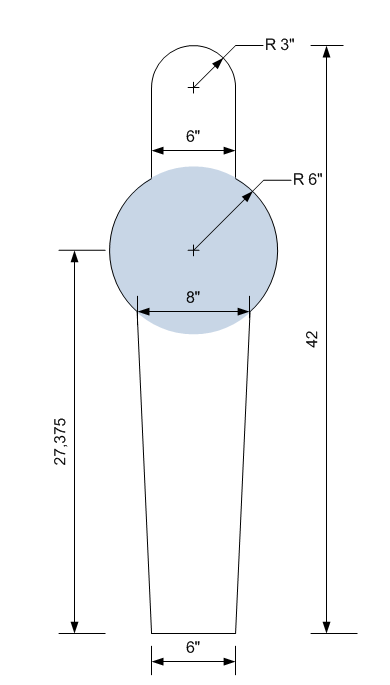
Pepper Popper, now obsolete.

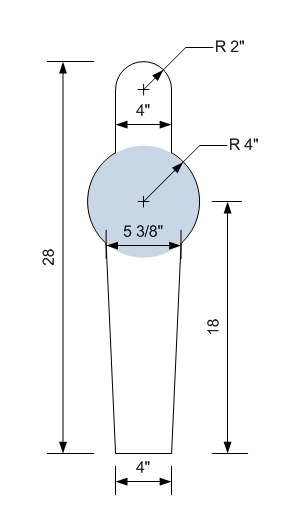
Mini Pepper Popper, now obsolete.

=== Biathlon ===
In biathlon, self-indicating steel targets are used that flip from black to white when hit, giving both the biathlete and spectators instant visual feedback for each shot fired. The target is placed at 50 meters, and has a diameter is 45 mm when shooting in the prone position, and 115 mm when shooting in the standing position. This translates to angular target sizes of about 1 and 2.5 mrad respectively.

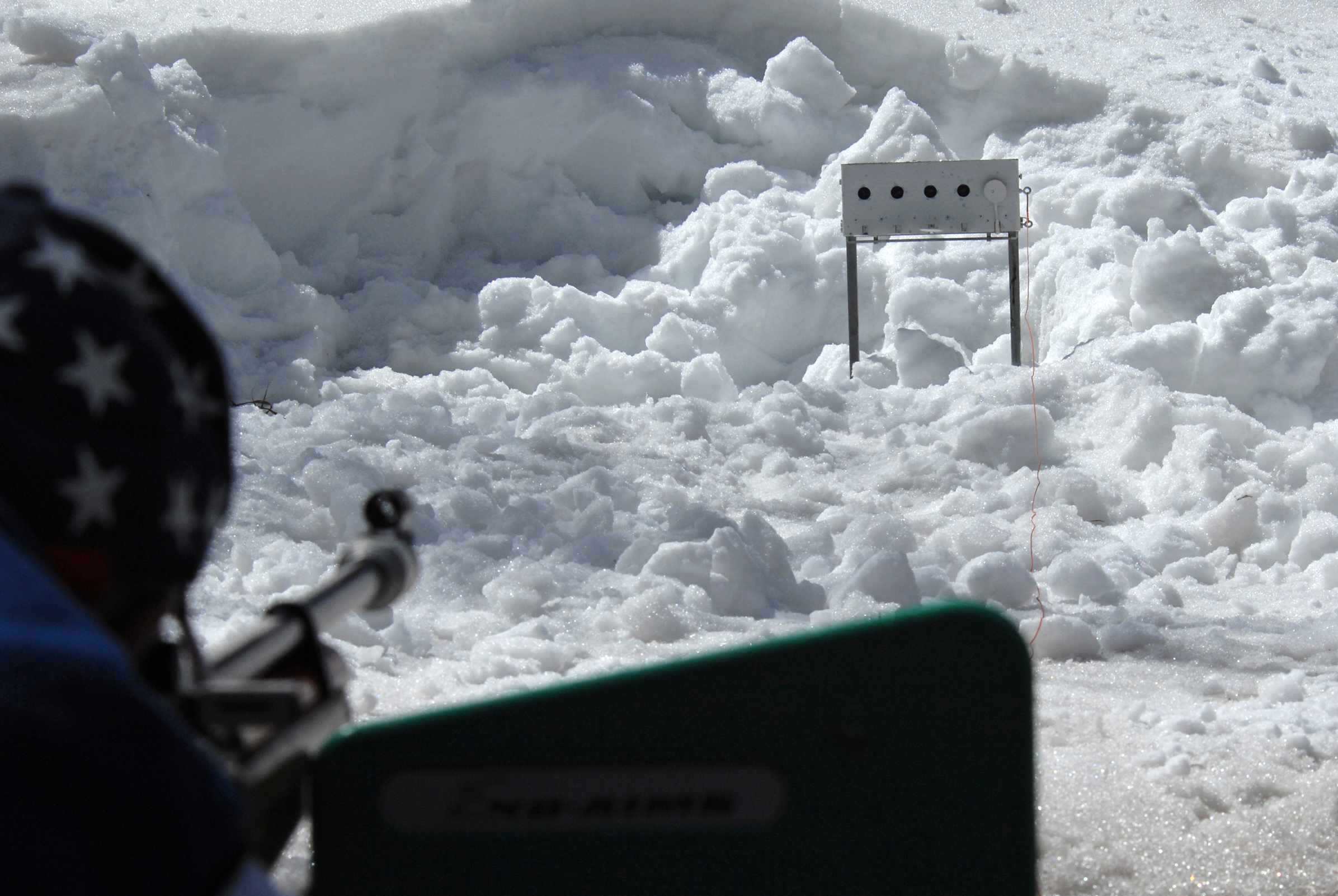
An example of the mechanical self-indicating targets used in biathlon since 1980.

== See also ==
- Steel Challenge
- Vickers hardness test
