= World Field Target Federation =

International shooting sports governing body

- Sport: Shooting sport
- Category: Field target
- Jurisdiction: International
- Membership: 43 regions
- Abbreviation: WFTF

Official website
- www.world-field-target-federation.org

The World Field Target Federation (WFTF) is the governing body for the shooting sport discipline of Field target. The WFTF specifies and regulates World Championship, International or other major field target events. The WFTF has 43 member federations spread across all 6 continents.

== Administration ==
The WFTF is managed by a president elected by nomination and majority vote from representatives of each National Governing Body (NGB) who serves for a period of three years.

Management of the world championship is the responsibility of the chairman of the hosting countries NGB and will act as Vice-President of the federation until the end of the hosted championship.

== World Championships ==
=== Categories ===
Field target is contested on an open competition basis, with all competitors eligible to win the overall championship in their class. There are two classes of shooting:

- Precharged (for competitors using PCP air rifles)
- Spring (for those using Spring-piston air rifles)

Each class offers the following placings:

- World Champion and 2nd to 10th
- 1st Lady
- 1st Veteran
- 1st Junior
- 1st to 3rd Teams

=== Host country ===
The location of the championships is based on rotation between the 43 member countries of the WFTF, a country via its NGB, has the opportunity to decline hosting of the event in which case the opportunity to host passes onto the next member country in sequence.

=== Results ===
==== Men's PCP Category ====
Year	Location	Champion	Second place	Third place
2009	Pretoria, South Africa	James Woodhead (ENG)	John Costello (ENG)	Mark Bassett (WAL)
2010	Debrecen, Hungary	Jose Redondo (ESP)	Andy Calpin (ENG)	Craig McDonald (ENG)
2011	Velo d'Astico, Italy	Conor Mc Flynn (NIR)	Simon Ayers (ENG)	James Osborne (ENG)
2012	Isfjorden, Norway	Andrew Gillott (ENG)	Daniel Eley (ENG)	Simon Evans (WAL)
2013	Ebern, Germany	John Costello (ENG)	Simon Ayers (ENG)	Sergey Zubenko (RUS)
2014	Wellington, New Zealand	Stefan Viljoen (South Africa)	Richard Beaugie (WAL)	Paul Plauche (USA)
2015	Dubingiai, Lithuania	Sergey Zubenko (RUS)	Jack Harris (WAL)	Ian Taylor (ENG)
2016	Lisbon, Portugal	Jack Harris (WAL)	Sergey Zubenko (RUS)	Andrew Calpin (ENG)
2017	Glanusk Park, Wales	Jack Harris (WAL)	Dorian Falconer (WAL)	John Costello (ENG)
2022	Italy	Jose Benito (ESP)	Jack Harris (WAL)	Gianni Fabianelli (ITA)

==== PCP Category Firsts ====
Year	Location	1st Ladies		1st Veteran		1st Junior	
1991	USA						
1992	England	Janet Milne (SCO)	115				
1993	USA	Kate Longbottom (ENG)					
1994	England	Janet Milne (SCO)	130				
1995	USA	Norma Almond (ENG)					
1996	England	Paula Schofield (ENG)	102				
1997	USA	Kath Thomas (WAL)	124				
1998	England	Angela Grim (ENG)	133				
1999	Norway	Eleanor Sherratt (ENG)	134				
2000	USA	K Southerland (USA)	108				
2001	England	Angela Grim (ENG)	121				
2002	Norway	Angela Grim (ENG)	140				
2003	Northern Ireland	Davinia Wainwright (ENG)	84				
2004	Germany	Jenny Taylor (ENG)	100				
2005	England	Beryl Noon (ENG)	115				
2006	Poland	Galina Yakushina (RUS)	119				
2007	USA	Rosie Smith (USA)	142				
2008	Northern Ireland	Paula Schofield (ENG)	122	Terry Almond (ENG)	127	Craig McDonald (ENG)	129
2009	Pretoria, South Africa	Erica Fourie (SAF)	95	Alan Keyser (SAF)	88	Francois DuToit (SAF)	92
2010	Debrecen, Hungary	Paula Schofield (ENG)	115	Chris Briscoe (ENG)	115	Craig McDonald (ENG)	137
2011	Velo d'Astico, Italy	Galina Yakushina (RUS)	119	Greg Suave (USA)	123	Francois DuToit (SAF)	128
2012	Isfjorden, Norway	Ana Pereira (POR)	131	Greg Suave (USA)	135	Francois DuToit (SAF)	132
2013	Ebern, Germany	Natali Terblanche (SAF)	132	Greg Suave (USA)	132	JP De Jager (SAF)	130
2022	Italy	Lauren Parsons (USA)	103	Guido Kuppens (BEL)	100	Lucas Wessman (SWE)	103

===== Team PCP Category =====
Year	Location	1st Team		2nd Team		3rd Team	
1991	USA	Great Britain	1334	USA	1264		
1992	England	Great Britain	408	USA	322		
1993	USA	Great Britain	1296	USA	1246		
1994	England	England A	701	England B	680	England C	661
1995	USA	England A	749	England B	734	USA A	710
1996	England						
1997	USA	England A	783	USA A	775	USA B	720
1998	England	England A	832	England B	828	Wales	738
1999	Norway	England	818	Norway	559	Northern Ireland	547
2000	USA	USA	740	England	708	Wales	570
2001	England	England	828	Wales	751	USA	689
2002	Norway	England	843	Germany	658	Norway	569
2003	Northern Ireland	England	865	Germany	671	Northern Ireland	650
2004	Germany	England	749	Germany	593	Poland	527
2005	England	England	541	Wales	484	Northern Ireland	457
2006	Poland	England	543	South Africa	489	Poland	484
2007	USA	USA	814	England	724	South Africa	714
2008	Northern Ireland	England	662	South Africa	582	Russia	568
2009	Pretoria, South Africa	England	469	South Africa	448	Germany	381
2010	Debrecen, Hungary	England	544	South Africa	522	Russia	506
2011	Velo d'Astico, Italy	England	524	South Africa	508	Hungary	491
2012	Isfjorden, Norway	England	562	South Africa	532	Germany	527
2013	Ebern, Germany	England	566	Hungary	530	South Africa	529
2022	Italy	Wales	353	Spain	343	Italy	339
