= IPSC Norwegian Rifle Championship =

Sport shooting competition in Norway

The IPSC Norwegian Rifle Championship is an IPSC level 3 championship held once a year by Dynamic Sports Shooting Norway.

== Champions ==
The following is a list of current and previous champions.

=== Overall category ===
Year	Division	Gold	Silver	Bronze	Venue
1987		(Norway) Rolf Simensen	(Norway) Sverre Idland	(Norway) Øyvind Henningsen	Vatneleiren, Sandnes Municipality
1988		(Norway) Folke Myrvang	(Norway) Sverre Idland	(Norway) Storm Krogh	Vatneleiren, Sandnes Municipality
1989		(Norway) Sverre Idland	(Norway) Folke Myrvang	(Norway) Reidar Sviland	Ulven, Os Municipality
1990		(Norway) Sverre Idland	(Norway) Bengt Larsson	(Norway) Ivan Gjetrang	Høylandsfjellet, Time Municipality
1991		(Norway) Sverre Idland	(Norway) Johnny Reyes	(Norway) Bengt Larsson	Sessvollmoen, Ullensaker Municipality
1992		(Norway) Sverre Idland	(Norway) Kjell Ivar Nesvåg	(Norway) Bengt Larsson	Vikesdalsmoen, Bjerkreim Municipality
1993		(Norway) Sverre Idland	(Norway) Kjell Ivar Nesvåg	(Norway) Reidar Sviland	Sokndal Municipality
1994		(Norway) Bengt Larsson	(Norway) Sverre Idland	(Norway) Rune Hagen	Sessvollmoen, Ullensaker Municipality
1995		(Norway) Sverre Idland	(Norway) Bengt Larsson	(Norway) Svein Kåre Høien	Vikesdalsmoen, Bjerkreim Municipality
1996		(Norway) Sverre Idland	(Norway) Geir Wollmann	(Norway) Bengt Larsson	Sessvollmoen, Ullensaker Municipality
1997		(Norway) Odd Strengenes	(Norway) Morten Kløv	(Norway) Sverre Idland	Haraland, Gjesdal Municipality
1998		(Norway) Odd Strengenes	(Norway) Staale Rasmussen	(Norway) Geir Wollmann	Steinsjøen, Østre Toten Municipality
1999		(Norway) Flemming Pedersen	(Norway) Odd Strengenes	(Norway) Sverre Idland	Steinsjøen, Østre Toten Municipality
2000		(Norway) Flemming Pedersen	(Norway) Even Skaarer	(Norway) Odd Strengenes	Steinsjøen, Østre Toten Municipality
2001		(Norway) Even Skaarer	(Norway) Odd Strengenes	(Norway) Frank Sandås	Hell, Stjørdal Municipality
2002	Open	(Norway) Even Skaarer	(Norway) Steinar Haugli	(Norway) Flemming Pedersen	Steinsjøen, Østre Toten Municipality
2002	Standard	(Norway) Runar Staveli	(Norway) Eirik Nilsen	(Norway) Egil Vollan	Steinsjøen, Østre Toten Municipality
2003	Open	(Norway) Hans Roger Loe	(Norway) Steinar Haugli	(Norway) Roger Jensen	Steinsjøen, Østre Toten Municipality
2004	Open	(Norway) Even Skaarer	(Norway) Hans Roger Loe	(Norway) Henrik Kjølner	Haltdalen, Holtålen Municipality
2004	Standard	(Norway) Sverre Idland	(Norway) Svein Erik Myhra	(Norway) Per Erik Salvesen	Haltdalen, Holtålen Municipality
2005	Open	(Norway) Even Skaarer	(Norway) Odd Strengenes	(Norway) Kyrre Lee	Blikshavn, Karmøy Municipality
2005	Standard	(Norway) Sverre Idland	(Norway) Per-Erik Salvesen	(Norway) Runar Staveli	Blikshavn, Karmøy Municipality
2006	Open	(Norway) Odd Strengenes	(Norway) Even Skaarer	(Norway) Kristian Rommen	Terningmoen, Elverum Municipality
2006	Standard	(Norway) Sverre Idland	(Norway) Per Erik Salvesen	(Norway) Runar Staveli	Terningmoen, Elverum Municipality
2007	Open	(Norway) Kristian Rommen	(Norway) Odd Strengenes	(Norway) Frank Sandås	Evjemoen, Evje og Hornnes Municipality
2007	Standard	(Norway) Sverre Idland	(Norway) Kristian Førde	(Norway) Runar Staveli	Evjemoen, Evje og Hornnes Municipality
2007	Manual Open	(Norway) Ola Skårild	(Norway) Roy Stenersen	(Norway) Jostein Hassel	Evjemoen, Evje og Hornnes Municipality
2008	Open	(Norway) Kristian Rommen	(Norway) Odd Strengenes	(Norway) Kyrre Lee	Heistadmoen, Kongsberg Municipality
2008	Standard	(Norway) Sverre Idland	(Norway) Per-Erik Salvesen	(Norway) Kai-Inge Larsen	Heistadmoen, Kongsberg Municipality
2009	Open	(Norway) Kristian Rommen	(Norway) Odd Strengenes	(Norway) Lars Gjermund Syversen	Sessvollmoen, Ullensaker Municipality
2009	Standard	(Norway) Sverre Idland	(Norway) Per-Erik Salvesen	(Norway) Erik Dahl	Sessvollmoen, Ullensaker Municipality
2009	Manual Open	(Norway) Jostein Hassel	(Norway) Geir Ivar Bredgaten	(Norway) Øyvind Lundberg	Sessvollmoen, Ullensaker Municipality
2010	Open	(Norway) Kristian Rommen	(Norway) Odd Strengenes	(Norway) Lars Syversen	Oksvoll, Bjugn Municipality
2010	Standard	(Norway) Sverre Idland	(Norway) Per-Erik Salvesen	(Norway) Øystein Lütcherath	Oksvoll, Bjugn Municipality
2011	Open	(Norway) Kristian Rommen	(Norway) Frank Sandås	(Norway) Henrik Kjølner	Revhiholen, Gjøvik Municipality
2011	Standard	(Norway) Per-Erik Salvesen	(Norway) Sverre Idland	(Norway) Odd Strengenes	Revhiholen, Gjøvik Municipality
2012	Open	(Norway) Kristian Rommen	(Norway) Frank Sandås	(Norway) Odd Strengenes	Revhiholen, Gjøvik Municipality
2012	Standard	(Norway) Sverre Idland	(Norway) Per-Erik Salvesen	(Norway) Kristian Førde	Revhiholen, Gjøvik Municipality
2012	Manual Open	(Norway) Geir Ivar Bredgaten	(Norway) Lars Erik Nilsen	(Norway)	Revhiholen, Gjøvik Municipality
2012	Manual Standard	(Norway) Arild Berglund	(Norway) Nils Sundheim	(Norway) Gaute Hansen	Revhiholen, Gjøvik Municipality
2013	Open	(Norway) Kristian Rommen	(Norway) Lars Syversen	(Norway) Odd Strengenes	Heistadmoen, Kongsberg Municipality
2013	Standard	(Norway) Sverre Idland	(Norway) Øystein Lütcherath	(Norway) Kjetil Sletsjøe Svendsen	Heistadmoen, Kongsberg Municipality
2014	Open	(Norway) Kenneth Salen	(Norway) Odd Strengenes	(Norway) Vegard Fredriksen	Furumoen, Hemne Municipality
2014	Standard	(Norway) Håvard Østgaard	(Norway) Øystein Lütcherath	(Norway) Per-Erik Salvesen	Furumoen, Hemne Municipality
2015	Open	(Norway) Kenneth Salen	(Norway) Glenn Thomas Ugulen	(Norway) Michael Lindgjerdet	Reviholen, Gjøvik Municipality
2015	Standard	(Norway) Håvard Østgaard	(Norway) Sverre Idland	(Norway) Kjetil Sletsjøe Svendsen	Reviholen, Gjøvik Municipality
2016	Open	(Norway) Kenneth Salen	(Norway) Kristian Rommen	(Norway) Glenn Thomas Ugulen	Setermoen, Bardu Municipality
2016	Standard	(Norway) Håvard Østgaard	(Norway) Sverre Idland	(Norway) Lasse Selven	Setermoen, Bardu Municipality
2017	Open	(Norway) Vegard Fredriksen	(Norway) Kristian Rommen	(Norway) Magnus Haugerud	Revhiholen, Gjøvik Municipality
2017	Standard	(Norway) Odd Strengenes	(Norway) Håvard Østgaard	(Norway) Sverre Idland	Revhiholen, Gjøvik Municipality
2018	Open	(Norway) Kristian Rommen	(Norway) Glenn Thomas Ugulen	(Norway) Magnus Haugerud	Revhiholen, Gjøvik Municipality
2018	Standard	(Norway) Håvard Østgaard	(Norway) Kristoffer Fagerstrand Heia	(Norway) Øystein Lütcherath	Revhiholen, Gjøvik Municipality
2018	Manual Open	(Norway) Geir Ivar Bredgaten	(Norway) Andreas Lyssand	(Norway) Tormod Bjørnødegård	Revhiholen, Gjøvik Municipality

=== Lady category ===
Year	Division	Gold	Silver	Bronze	Venue
2017	Open	(Norway) Ann-Kathrin Mulstad	(Norway) Anita Larsen	(Norway) Ann-Cathrin Hansen	Revhiholen, Gjøvik
2018	Open	(Norway) Ann-Kathrin Mulstad	(Norway) Emilie Skårild	(Norway) Ann-Cathrin Hansen	Revhiholen, Gjøvik

=== Junior category ===
Year	Division	Gold	Silver	Bronze	Venue

=== Senior category ===
Year	Division	Gold	Silver	Bronze	Venue
2015	Open	(Norway) Tore Fiborg	(Norway) Svein Helge Hennum	(Norway) Martin Due	Reviholen, Gjøvik Municipality
2016	Open	(Norway) Tåle Johnstad	(Norway) Torstein Schaug-Pettersen	(Norway) Hans Eng	Setermoen, Bardu Municipality
2017	Open	(Norway) Johnny Reyes	(Norway) Hans Eng	(Norway) Tore Fiborg	Revhiholen, Gjøvik Municipality
2018	Standard	(Norway) Odd Strengenes	(Norway) Sverre Idland	(Norway) Lars Selven	Revhiholen, Gjøvik Municipality
2018	Open	(Norway) Tore Fiborg	(Norway) Lars Syversen	(Norway) Halvor Ajer	Revhiholen, Gjøvik Municipality

=== Super Senior category ===
Year	Division	Gold	Silver	Bronze	Venue
2017	Open	(Norway) Einar Johan Holst	(Norway) Oddbjørn Haarberg		Revhiholen, Gjøvik Municipality

== See also ==
- Nordic Rifle Championship
- Norwegian Handgun Championship
- Norwegian Tournament Championship
