= IPSC Nordic Handgun Championship =

Sport shooting competition

The IPSC Nordic Handgun Championship is an IPSC level 3 championship hosted in every year either in Norway, Sweden, Finland or Denmark. Until 2017 the championships were held annually in all divisions. But from 2018 onward championships in Open and Production division will be held even years and championships in Classic, Revolver and Standard divisions uneven years.

== Champions ==
The following is a list of current and past IPSC Nordic Handgun champions.

=== Overall category ===
Year	Division	Gold	Silver	Bronze	Venue
1985		(Norway) Flemming Pedersen	(Norway) Per Mathiesen	(Norway) Terje Lund	Løvenskiold, Norway
1986		(Norway) Johnny Hoffmann	(Norway) Vidar Nakling	(Norway) Per Mathiesen	Uppsala, Sweden
1995	Open	(Norway) Henning Wallgren	(Norway) Flemming Petersen	(Finland) Olavi Vahakallio	Romerike Open, Sesvoll, Norway
1995	Standard	(Sweden) Niclas Dal	(Norway) Geir Wollmann	(Norway) Hans Loe	Romerike Open, Sesvoll, Norway
1996	Open	(Norway) Henning Wallgren	(Norway) Flemming Pedersen	(Sweden) Magnus Johansson	Rooster Mountain, Hillerød, Denmark
1996	Standard	(Sweden) Jörgen Björk	(Sweden) Leif Madsen	(Denmark) Henrik F. Nielsen	Rooster Mountain, Hillerød, Denmark
1997	Open	(Norway) Henning Wallgren	(Sweden) Johan Hansen	(Norway) Flemming Pedersen	Sipoo, Finland
1997	Standard	(Sweden) Johan Hansen	(Sweden) Niclas Dal	(Norway) Flemming Pedersen	Nordic Championships, Jun 14–15 in Haugesund, Norway
1998	Open				Hanebjerg, Denmark
1998	Standard	(Sweden) Jörgen Björk	(Sweden) Niclas Dal	(Sweden) Robert Söderström	Gothenburg, Sweden
1999	Modified	(Finland) Stefan Borgström	(Finland) Kristian Poikonen	(Finland) Jarmo Jeulonen	Gun-Corner Shootout, 10–11 July, Sipoo, Finland
1999	Standard	(Sweden) Robert Söderström	(Sweden) Dan Liljeström	(Norway) Steinar Haugli	Gun-Corner Shootout, 10–11 July, Sipoo, Finland
2000	Open	(Sweden) Johan Hansen	(Finland) Tommi Marttinen	(Sweden) Johan Norberg	Oden Cup, Uppsala, Sweden
2000	Standard	(Norway) Hans Roger Loe	(Norway) Steinar Haugli	(Norway) Jostein Töjen	Oden Cup, Uppsala, Sweden
2001	Open	(Norway) Hans Petter Lie	(Sweden) Johan Hansen	(Finland) Tomi Nyman	Finland
2002	Open	(Sweden) Johan Hansen	(Norway) Hans Petter Lie	(Norway) Kyrre Lee	Rooster Mountain, Hillerød, Denmark
2002	Production	(Sweden) Jörgen Björk	(Sweden) Jörgen Andersson	(Denmark) Bo Stampe	Rooster Mountain, Hillerød, Denmark
2002	Revolver	(Sweden) Ivar Edfelt	(Sweden) Klas Lundberg	(Denmark) Hans Jørgen Jensen	Rooster Mountain, Hillerød, Denmark
2002	Standard	(Sweden) Robert Söderström	(Denmark) Ralf K. Jensen	(Norway) Steinar Haugli	Rooster Mountain, Hillerød, Denmark
2003	Standard	(Norway) Steinar Haugli	(Norway) Hans Roger Loe	(Norway) Jostein Tøien	Haltdalen, Norway
2003	Open	(Norway) Henning Wallgren	(Sweden) Johan Nordberg	(Norway) Hans Petter Lie	Kongsvinger, Norway
2003	Standard	(Norway) Steinar Haugli	(Norway) Hans Roger Loe	(Denmark) Ralf K. Jensen	TNT Match, Oulu, Finland
2003	Production				
2003	Revolver				
2004	Open	(Norway) Steinar Haugli	(Sweden) Johan Hansen	(Finland) Tommi Marttinen	Rooster Mountain, Hillerød, Denmark
2004	Production	(Sweden) Jörgen Björk	(Norway) Even Skaarer	(Denmark) Jack Rømer	Rooster Mountain, Hillerød, Denmark
2004	Revolver	(Denmark) Frants Pedersen	(Denmark) Kim Poulsen	(Sweden) Roger Tiensuu	Rooster Mountain, Hillerød, Denmark
2004	Standard	(Norway) Steinar Haugli	(Denmark) Ralf K. Jensen	(Sweden) Jörgen Björk	Rooster Mountain, Hillerød, Denmark
2005	Open	(Finland) Matti Manni	(Finland) Vesa Jumppanen	(Finland) Tommi Marttinen	Sipoo, Finland
2005	Production	(Norway) Even Skaarer	(Sweden) Dan Liljeström	(Norway) Flemming Pedersen	Sipoo, Finland
2005	Revolver				
2005	Standard	(Norway) Hans Roger Loe	(Norway) Steinar Haugli	(Norway) Even Skaarer	Kongsvinger
2006	Open	(Sweden) Johan Nordberg	(Finland) Matti Manni	(Sweden) Johan Hansen	Gothenburg, Sweden
2006	Production	(Sweden) Jörgen Björk	(Sweden) Jörgen Andersson	(Norway) Even Skaarer	Sanda, Sweden
2006	Revolver	(Denmark) Frants Pedersen	(Norway) Ole Eilertsen	(Norway) Rune Vikeby	Rooster Mountain, Hillerød, Denmark
2006	Standard	(Finland) Matti Manni	(Denmark) Ralf K. Jensen	(Norway) Even Skaarer	Rooster Mountain, Hillerød, Denmark
2007	Open	(Norway) Steinar Haugli	(Sweden) Lars-Tony Skoog	(Norway) Kyrre Lee	SNO, Løvenskiold, Norway
2007	Production	(Norway) Even Skaarer	(Sweden) Jörgen Björk	(Denmark) Jack Rømer	Kongsvinger Open, Kongsvinger, Norway
2007	Revolver				
2007	Standard	(Finland) Matti Manni	(Norway) Even Skaarer	(Finland) Tony R. Ruohonen	SSG Summer Match, Sipoo, Finland
2008	Open	(Sweden) Faj Tran	(Sweden) Lars Tony Skoog	(Sweden) Johan Hansen	Rooster Mountain, Hillerød, Denmark
2008	Production	(Finland) Matti Manni	(Norway) Even Skaarer	(Finland) Tony R. Ruohonen	Rooster Mountain, Hillerød, Denmark
2008	Revolver	(Norway) Ole Eilertsen	(Norway) Rune Vikeby	(Norway) Bjørn Lindblad	Sandaknallen, Årjäng, Sweden
2008	Standard	(Norway) Steinar Haugli	(Norway) Rino Olsen	(Sweden) Fredrik Wildemo	Sandaknallen, Årjäng, Sweden
2009	Open	(Finland) Raine Peltokoski	(Finland) Hannu Uronen	(Finland) Petri H. Runnti	Finnish Handgun Championship Nordic Open And Prod, Finland
2009	Production	(Finland) Vesa Kaunisto	(Finland) Lauri Nosainen	(Finland) Tero Nikkarikoski	Finnish Handgun Championship Nordic Open And Prod, Finland
2009	Revolver				
2009	Standard	(Norway) Steinar Haugli	(Sweden) Robert Andersson	(Norway) Hans Petter Lie	Red Apple Open, Holmestrand, Norway
2010	Open	(Sweden) Lars Tony Skoog	(Sweden) Johan Hansen	(Sweden) Johan Nordberg	Gothenburg Open, Gothenburg, Sweden
2010	Production	(Sweden) Rasmus Gyllenberg	(Denmark) Lars Hagemann	(Finland) Lauri Nousiainen	Gothenburg Open, Gothenburg, Sweden
2010	Revolver	(Norway) Ole Eilertsen	(Sweden) Anders Lindfors	(Sweden) Olle Lindskog	Rooster Mountain, Hillerød, Denmark
2010	Standard	(Denmark) Ralf K. Jensen	(Denmark) Christian Thomsen	(Sweden) Mats Bäckström	Rooster Mountain, Hillerød, Denmark
2011	Open	(Norway) Steinar Haugli	(Sweden) Lars-Tony Skoog	(Norway) Hans Petter Lie	SNO, Løvenskiold, Norway
2011	Production	(Sweden) Rasmus Gyllenberg	(Norway) Steinar Haugli	(Norway) Even Skaarer	Kongsvinger Open, Kongsvinger, Norway
2011	Revolver				
2011	Standard	(Finland) Risto Hirvikallio	(Finland) Tony R. Ruohonen	(Finland) Lauri Nousiainen	Summermatch, Sipoo, Finland
2012	Classic	Did not qualify as a division			Rooster Mountain, Hillerød, Denmark
2012	Open	(Norway) Frank Sandås	(Finland) Simo Partanen	(Denmark) Eli Huttner	Rooster Mountain, Hillerød, Denmark
2012	Production	(Sweden) Rasmus Gyllenberg	(Norway) Odd Strengenes	(Sweden) Magnus Johansson	Rooster Mountain, Hillerød, Denmark
2012	Revolver	(Sweden) Per Bergfeldt	(Sweden) Anders Lindfors	(Norway) Ole Eilertsen	Gothenburg Open, Gothenburg, Sweden
2012	Standard	(Sweden) Lars-Tony Skoog	(Denmark) Ralf K. Jensen	(Sweden) Rasmus Gyllenberg	Gothenburg Open, Gothenburg, Sweden
2013	Classic	(Norway) Even Skaarer	(Norway) Odd Strengenes	(Norway) Rino Olsen	SNO, Løvenskiold, Norway
2013	Revolver	(Norway) Ole Eilertsen	(Norway) Rune Vikeby	(Sweden) Per Bergfeldt	SNO, Løvenskiold, Norway
2013	Open				
2013	Production	(Finland) Pekka Kakkonen	(Finland) Jere Hakanen	(Finland) Sami Ojanpää	WasaMatch, Vaasa, Finland
2013	Standard	(Norway) Bjarte Drange	(Sweden) Mats Parhammar	(Norway) Simon Engan	Midnight Sun Shoot, Setermoen, Norway
2014	Classic	(Sweden) Robert Söderström	(Norway) Christopher Thorstensen	(Sweden) Faj Tran	Rooster Mountain, Hillerød, Denmark
2014	Revolver	(Sweden) Kalle Halvarsson	(Norway) Ole Eilertsen	(Denmark) Henrik F. Nielsen	Rooster Mountain, Hillerød, Denmark
2014	Standard	(Sweden) Rasmus Gyllenberg	(Sweden) Magnus Johansson	(Norway) Steinar Haugli	Rooster Mountain, Hillerød, Denmark
2014	Open	(Finland) Simo Partanen	(Sweden) Johan Hansen	(Sweden) Johan Nordberg	West Coast Challenge, Gothenburg, Sweden
2014	Production	(Sweden) Magnus Johansson	(Sweden) Rasmus Gyllenberg	(Norway) Odd Strengenes	West Coast Challenge, Gothenburg, Sweden
2015	Classic	(Finland) Hannu Urunen	(Sweden) Peter Kastell	(Sweden) Faj Tran	WasaMatch, Vaasa, Finland
2015	Revolver	(Sweden) Kalle Halvarsson	(Sweden) Per Bergfeldt	(Norway) Bjarte Drange	WasaMatch, Vaasa, Finland
2015	Standard	(Finland) Tony Ruohonen	(Finland) Jani Kinnala	(Finland) Mikko Kuisma	WasaMatch, Vaasa, Finland
2015	Open	(Sweden) Johan Nordberg	(Norway) Olav Kjelvei	(Norway) Terje Finsrud	SNO, Løvenskiold, Norway
2015	Production	(Norway) Bård Kristiansen	(Norway) Odd Strengenes	(Norway) Hans Petter Kvarsnes	Midnight Sun Shoot, Setermoen, Norway
2016	Classic	(Sweden) Peter Kastell	(Norway) Odd Strengenes	(Sweden) Lars-Tony Skoog	Malmö Handgun Championships, Malmö, Sweden
2016	Revolver	(Denmark) Henrik F Nielsen	(Sweden) Jonas Björk	(Sweden) Kalle Halvarsson	Malmö Handgun Championships, Malmö, Sweden
2016	Open	(Norway) Thomas Samuelsen	(Sweden) Joakim Wallin	(Sweden) Erik Stjernlöf	Copenhagen Open, Copenhagen, Denmark
2016	Production	(Sweden) Rasmus Gyllenberg	(Sweden) Magnus Johansson	(Sweden) Peter Kastell	Copenhagen Open, Copenhagen, Denmark
2016	Standard	(Finland) Tony Ruohonen	(Sweden) Magnus Johansson	(Norway) Steinar Haugli	Stockholm IPSC Open II, Stockholm, Sweden
2017	Classic	(Norway) Odd Strengenes	(Norway) Mads Wiel	(Norway) Håkon Myklebust	SNO, Løvenskiold, Norway
2017	Standard	(Norway) Per A Hansen	(Sweden) Rasmus Gyllenberg	(Norway) Frede Stenslie	SNO, Løvenskiold, Norway
2017	Revolver	(Denmark) Henrik F Nielsen	(Sweden) Jonas Björk	(Norway) Rune Vikeby	SNO, Løvenskiold, Norway
2017	Production	(Finland) Tero Heinonen	(Sweden) Robert Söderström	(Norway) Bard Kristiansen	WasaMatch, Vaasa, Finland
2018	Open	(Sweden) Erik Stjernlöf	(Sweden) Johan Nordberg	(Sweden) Bjarne Laring	Cops Cup Gothenburg Open, 12–13 May Gothenburg, Sweden
2018	Production	(Sweden) Rasmus Gyllenberg	(Finland) Tero Heinonen	(Sweden) Johan Modigh	Cops Cup Gothenburg Open, 12–13 May Gothenburg, Sweden
2019	Classic	(Norway) Steinar Haugli	(Sweden) Faj Tran	(Sweden) Lars Tony Skoog	Copenhagen Open, 15–16 June Copenhagen, Denmark
2019	Revolver	(Denmark) Henrik F Nielsen	(Norway) Bjarte Drange	(Denmark) David K Grainger	Copenhagen Open, 15–16 June Copenhagen, Denmark
2019	Standard	(Sweden) Rasmus Gyllenberg	(Norway) Lars Syversen	(Norway) Frede Stenslie	Copenhagen Open, 15–16 June Copenhagen, Denmark
2022	Production Optics	(Sweden) Rasmus Gyllenberg	(Sweden) Ted Alenius	(Sweden) David Levin	Kongsvinger Open, 11–12 June Kongsvinger, Norway
2022	Open	(Sweden) Erik Stjernlöf	(Norway) Anders Nerheim	(Norway) Christoffer Bjelland	Kongsvinger Open, 11–12 June Kongsvinger, Norway
2023	Standard	(Denmark) Pavel Ibenforth	(Sweden) Rasmus Gyllenberg	(Norway) Per A Hansen	Copenhagen Open, 10-11 June Copenhagen, Denmark
2023	Classic	(Sweden) Martin Håkansson	(Norway) Espen S Fiskebeck	(Denmark) Kim Frandsen	Copenhagen Open, 10-11 June Copenhagen, Denmark
2023	Revolver	(Denmark) Henrik F Nielsen	(Denmark) Ole Mortensen	(Denmark) Jakob Schultz	Copenhagen Open, 10-11 June Copenhagen, Denmark
2025	Classic	(Norway) Odd Stregenes	(Sweden) Pär Hylander	(Norway) Stig Aarmo	Copenhagen Open, 19-20 June Copenhagen, Denmark
2025	Standard	(Sweden) Rasmus Gyllenberg	(Denmark) Bo Stampe Madsen	(Denmark) Sissal Skaale	Copenhagen Open, 19-20 June Copenhagen, Denmark

=== Lady category ===
Year	Division	Gold	Silver	Bronze	Venue
1997	Open	(Sweden) Birgit Anderlund	(Finland) Heli Harakka-Nyman	(Finland) Tiina Palmola	Finland
1997	Standard	(Norway) Hilde Boge			Norway
1998	Standard	(Denmark) Rikke Hallengren			Sweden
1999	Standard	(Sweden) Birgit Anderlund	(Finland) Heli Harakka-Nyman	(Finland) Karla Enemo	Gun-Corner Shootout, 10–11 July, Sipoo, Finland
2014	Production	(Denmark) Norah Josephsen	(Sweden) Tina Oskarsson	(Sweden) Marianne Hansen	West Coast Challenge, Gothenburg, Sweden
2015	Standard	(Finland) Kaisa Koski	(Finland) Tiia Honkaselkä	(Finland) Maria Appelroth	WasaMatch, Vaasa, Finland
2016	Open	(Denmark) Norah Josephsen	(Norway) Lene Olaug Kråkø	(Sweden) Marianne Hansen	Copenhagen Open, Copenhagen, Denmark
2016	Production	(Sweden) Cecilia Lindberg	(Sweden) Tina Oskarsson	(Sweden) Madelen Berg	Copenhagen Open, Copenhagen, Denmark
2016	Standard	(Norway) Hilde Nakling	(Sweden) Cecilia Lindberg	(Denmark) Norah Josephsen	Stockholm IPSC Open II, Stockholm, Sweden
2017	Production	(Sweden) Karin Wiklund	(Sweden) Sofia Dohmen	(Finland) Nastja Mustonen	WasaMatch, Vaasa, Finland
2017	Standard	(Norway) Hilde Nakling	(Norway) Rebecca Flugstad	(Norway) Ingunn Edvardsen	SNO, Løvenskiold, Norway
2018	Production	(Sweden) Cecilia Lindberg	(Sweden) Anna Utter	(Sweden) Dorothea Denwood	Cops Cup, Gothenburg Open, 12-13 maj

=== Junior category ===
Year	Division	Gold	Silver	Bronze	Venue
1997	Open	(Finland) Miika Toivanen	(Finland) Matti Lahtinen	(Finland) Aki Pöllänen	Finland

=== Senior category ===
Year	Division	Gold	Silver	Bronze	Venue
1997	Open	(Finland) Jorma Kotkatvuori	(Sweden) Curt Dahlgren	(Finland) Reijo Mikander	Finland
1997	Standard	(Norway) Halvor Sponberg	(Norway) Rolf Moen	(Norway) Ander Boge	Norway
1998	Standard	(Norway) Halvor Sponberg	(Sweden) Jan Holmgren	(Denmark) Kb Svendsen	Sweden
1999	Standard	(Sweden) Curt Dahlgren	(Sweden) Ulrik Andersson	(Finland) Jorma Kotkatvuori	Gun-Corner Shootout, 10–11 July, Sipoo, Finland
2014	Open	(Sweden) Johan Hansen	(Denmark) Peter Schieck	(Denmark) Gert Erling Hansen	West Coast Challenge, Gothenburg, Sweden
2014	Production	(Norway) Morten Klov	(Sweden) Peter Svedberg	(Sweden) Mikael Olsson	West Coast Challenge, Gothenburg, Sweden
2014	Standard	(Norway) Rune Vikeby	(Sweden) Stefan Johannesson	(Denmark) Claus Stahnke	Rooster Mountain, Hillerød, Denmark
2015	Open	(Norway) Erlend Berg	(Norway) Roger Johansen	(Denmark) Peter Schieck	SNO, Løvenskiold, Norway
2015	Production	(Norway) Folke Myrvang	(Norway) Knut Øystein Bilden	(Norway) Halvor Ajer	Midnight Sun Shoot, Setermoen, Norway
2015	Standard	(Finland) Mikael Rönnqvist	(Sweden) Mats Parhammar	(Sweden) Peter Svedberg	WasaMatch, Vaasa, Finland
2016	Classic	(Denmark) Gert Erling Hansen	(Sweden) Bengt Bäckström	(Sweden) Lars-Åke Ingemarsson	Malmö Handgun Championships, Malmö, Sweden
2016	Revolver	(Sweden) Olle Lindskog	(Sweden) Per Bergfeldt	(Norway) Rune Vikeby	Malmö Handgun Championships, Malmö, Sweden
2016	Open	(Sweden) Johan Hansen	(Denmark) Frants Pedersen	(Denmark) Peter Davis	Copenhagen Open, Copenhagen, Denmark
2016	Production	(Denmark) Lars Hagemann	(Sweden) Niclas Dal	(Denmark) Søren Larsen	Copenhagen Open, Copenhagen, Denmark
2016	Standard	(Sweden) Niclas Dal	(Sweden) Mats Parhammar	(Sweden) Jonas Renström	Stockholm IPSC Open II, Stockholm, Sweden
2017	Production	(Sweden) Peter Svedberg	(Finland) Mikael Rönnqvist	(Norway) Folke Myrvang	WasaMatch, Vaasa, Finland
2017	Standard	(Norway) Morten Klov	(Sweden) Niclas Dal	(Denmark) Lars Hagemann	SNO, Løvenskiold, Norway
2018	Open	(Sweden) Jens Söderlund	(Sweden) Jens Sandberg	Peter Schieck	Cops Cup, Gothenburg Open, 12-13 maj
2018	Standard	(Denmark) Jan Bode	(Sweden) Mats Parhammar	(Sweden) Per-Arne Svensson	Cops Cup, Gothenburg Open, 12-13 maj
2018	Production	(Denmark) Lars Hagemann	(Sweden) Stefan Johannesson	(Denmark) Christian D Jensen	Cops Cup, Gothenburg Open, 12-13 maj
2019	Standard	(Norway) Lars Syversen	(Sweden) Niclas Dal	(Denmark) Torben G Skjoldborg	Copenhagen Open, Denmark
2022	Production Optics	(Sweden) Lars-Tony Skoog	(Sweden) Niclas Dal	(Norway) Rino Olsen	Kongsvinger Open, Norway
2025	Standard	(Denmark) Bo Stampe Madsen	(Denmark) Stefan Kryger Starke	(Sweden) Mats Karlsson	Copenhagen Open, Copenhagen
2025	Classic	(Norway) Odd Strengenes	(Sweden) Pär Hylander	(Norway) Ole Eilertsen	Copenhagen Open, Copenhagen

=== Super Senior category ===
Year	Division	Gold	Silver	Bronze	Venue
2025	Standard	(Norway) Folke Myrvang	(Norway) Rune Vikeby	(Denmark) Jan Bode	Copenhagen Open, Copenhagen

=== Team category ===
Year	Division	Gold	Silver	Bronze	Venue
1999	Standard	(Sweden) Robert Söderström, Dan Liljeström, Johan Hansen, Niclas Dal	(Norway) Steinar Haugli, Hans Roger Loe, Jostein Töien, Harry Pedersen	(Finland) Olavi Vähäkallio, Marko Voutilainen, Jari Ahonen, Ari Liikanen	Gun-Corner Shootout, 10–11 July, Sipoo, Finland
2017	Classic	(Norway) Espen Birketvedt, Frode Mølland, Håkon Myklebust, Ronny Røise	(Denmark) Jacob Larsen, Gert Erling Hansen, Mark Weisinger	(Sweden) Bengt Bäckström, Kent Stangvik	SNO, Løvenskiold, Norway
2017	Standard	(Norway) Frede Stenslie, Lars Syversen, Markus Alvestad, Per A Hansen	(Sweden) Peter Kastell, Rasmus Gyllenberg, Ricardo Soler, Robert Börjesson	(Finland) Kai Korjula, Kari Kivistö, Timo Jetsonen	SNO, Løvenskiold, Norway
2017	Revolver	(Norway) Bjarte Drange, Bård Johansen, Ole Eilertsen, Rune Vikeby	(Denmark) Henrik F Nielsen, Jakob Schultz, Jørgen Rigtrup, Ole Mortensen	-	SNO, Løvenskiold, Norway
2017	Production	(Finland) Esa Blom, Niklas Laurin, Tero Heinonen, Vesa Kaunisto	(Sweden) Andreas Johansson, Kalle Halvarsson, Robert Söderström, Ted Åhlenius	(Norway) Bard Kristiansen, Folke Myrvang, Simon Engan, Vegar Gabrielsen	WasaMatch, Vaasa, Finland
2022	Open	(Norway) Anders Nerheim, Dariusz Kowalczyk, Marius S. Tangen, Torgeir Skjerdal	(Sweden) Erik Stjernlöf, Christoffer Thander, Daniel Lilienberg, Marcus Norberg		Kongsvinger, Norway

=== Team Lady category ===
Year	Division	Gold	Silver	Bronze	Venue
1999	Standard	(Sweden) Birgit Anderlund, Karla Enemo, Lisa Jonsson-Seth, Bodil Pålsson	(Finland) Heli Harakka-Nyman, Virpi Virtanen-Pietiläine, Tarja Haukka	-	Gun-Corner Shootout, 10–11 July, Sipoo, Finland
2017	Production	(Sweden) Karin Wiklund, Kristina Nilsson, Sofia Dohmen	(Finland) Emily Blom, Iina Witick, Johanna Havinen, Nastja Mustonen	-	WasaMatch, Vaasa, Finland

== See also ==
- IPSC Nordic Mini Rifle Championship
- IPSC Nordic Rifle Championship
- IPSC Nordic Shotgun Championship
