= IPSC Norwegian Handgun Championship =

Sport shooting competition in Norway

The IPSC Norwegian Handgun Championship is an IPSC level 3 championship held once a year by Dynamic Sports Shooting Norway.

== Champions ==
The following is a list of previous and current champions.

=== Overall category ===
Year	Division	Gold	Silver	Bronze	Venue
1977		(Norway) Terje Lund	(Norway) Jon Steinsnes	(Norway) Erik Andersen	
1978		(Norway) Johnny Hoffmann	(Norway) Arnfinn Andersen	(Norway) Erik Braathen	
1979		(Norway) Per Høydahl	(Norway) Johnny Hoffmann	(Norway) Rolf Moen	
1980		(Norway) Johnny Hoffmann	(Norway) Bjarni Sverrison	(Norway) Mads Aas	
1981		(Norway) Terje Lund	(Norway) Vidar Nakling	(Norway) Erik Andersen	Larvik in Larvik Municipality
1982		(Norway) Johnny Hoffmann	(Norway) Terje Lund	(Norway) Flemming Pedersen	Ulven in Os Municipality
1983		(Norway) Vidar Nakling	(Norway) Johnny Hoffmann	(Norway) Mads Aas	Vatneleiren in Sandnes Municipality
1984		(Norway) Vidar Nakling	(Norway) Terje Lund	(Norway) Johnny Hoffmann	Løvenskiold in Bærum Municipality
1985		(Norway) Flemming Pedersen	(Norway) Vidar Nakling	(Norway) Johnny Hoffmann	Tveit in Kristiansand Municipality
1986		(Norway) Flemming Pedersen	(Norway) Terje Lund	(Norway) Per Mathiesen	Vatneleiren in Sandnes Municipality
1987		(Norway) Vidar Nakling	(Norway) Flemming Pedersen	(Norway) Arnt Magne Myhre	Løvenskiold in Bærum Municipality
1988		(Norway) Arnt Magne Myhre	(Norway) Flemming Pedersen	(Norway) Vidar Nakling	Tveit in Kristiansand Municipality
1989		(Norway) Arnt Magne Myhre	(Norway) Flemming Pedersen	(Norway) Vidar Nakling	Skien in Skien Municipality
1990		(Norway) Vidar Nakling	(Norway) Flemming Pedersen	(Norway) Johnny Hoffmann	Lillestrøm in Lillestrøm Municipality
1991		(Norway) Flemming Pedersen	(Norway) Jon I. Amundsen	(Norway) Johnny Hoffmann	Tveit in Kristiansand Municipality
1992		(Norway) Flemming Pedersen	(Norway) Vidar Nakling	(Norway) Johnny Hoffmann	Løvenskiold in Bærum Municipality
1993	Open	(Norway) Jon I. Amundsen	(Norway) Harald Westbye	(Norway) Bjørn Elseth	Aurskog in Aurskog-Høland Municipality
1994	Open	(Norway) Flemming Pedersen	(Norway) Bjørn Elseth	(Norway) Harald Westbye	Tveit in Kristiansand Municipality
1995	Open	(Norway) Flemming Pedersen	(Norway) Henning Wallgren	(Norway) Bjørn Elseth	Risør in Ringerike Municipality
1995	Standard	(Norway) Geir Wollmann	(Norway) Hans Roger Loe	(Norway) Tommy Thon	Risør in Ringerike Municipality
1996	Open	(Norway) Henning Wallgren	(Norway) Flemming Pedersen	(Norway) Harald Westbye	Sessvollmoen in Ullensaker Municipality
1996	Standard	(Norway) Flemming Pedersen	(Norway) Vidar Nakling	(Norway) Hans Roger Loe	Tveit in Kristiansand Municipality
1997	Open	(Norway) Flemming Pedersen	(Norway) Rune Christensen	(Norway) Harald Westbye	Vossevangen in Voss Municipality
1997	Standard	(Norway) Morten Kløv	(Norway) Steinar Haugli	(Norway) Hans Roger Loe	
1998	Open	(Norway) Glenn Friberg	(Norway) Hans Petter Lie	(Norway) Rune Christensen	Nesbyen in Nes Municipality
1998	Standard	(Norway) Flemming Pedersen	(Norway) Steinar Haugli	(Norway) Harry S. Pedersen	Nesbyen in Nes Municipality
1999	Open	(Norway) Hans Petter Lie	(Norway) Harald Westbye	(Norway) Rune Christensen	
1999	Standard	(Norway) Hans Roger Loe	(Norway) Steinar Haugli	(Norway) Harry S. Pedersen	
2000	Open	(Norway) Hans Petter Lie	(Norway) Thomas Samuelsen	(Norway) Rune Christensen	Hell in Stjørdal Municipality
2000	Standard	(Norway) Flemming Pedersen	(Norway) Hans Roger Loe	(Norway) Steinar Haugli	Hell in Stjørdal Municipality
2001	Open	(Norway) Rune Christensen	(Norway) Hans Petter Lie	(Norway) Kyrre Lee	
2001	Standard	(Norway) Hans Roger Loe	(Norway) Mads Wiel	(Norway) Steinar Haugli	
2002	Open	(Norway) Hans Petter Lie	(Norway) Rune Petter Christensen	(Norway) Thomas Samuelsen	Bjørkelangen in Aurskog-Høland Municipality
2002	Standard	(Norway) Hans Roger Loe	(Norway) Even Skaarer	(Norway) Mads Wiel	Bjørkelangen in Aurskog-Høland Municipality
2003	Open	(Norway) Kyrre Lee	(Norway) Thomas Samuelsen	(Norway) Hans Petter Lie	Haltdalen in Holtålen Municipality
2003	Standard	(Norway) Steinar Haugli	(Norway) Hans Roger Loe	(Norway) Jostein Tøien	Haltdalen in Holtålen Municipality
2003	Production	(Norway) Vegard Stensheim	(Norway) Thomas Ø. Nesgård	(Norway) Sven K. Strøm	Haltdalen in Holtålen Municipality
2004	Open	(Norway) Hans Petter Lie	(Norway) Kyrre Lee	(Norway) Thomas Samuelsen	Eplerød in Holmestrand Municipality
2004	Standard	(Norway) Henning Wallgren	(Norway) Steinar Haugli	(Norway) Hans Roger Loe	Eplerød in Holmestrand Municipality
2004	Production	(Norway) Olav Rokseth	(Norway) Harald Nilssen	(Norway) Conrad Holm	Eplerød in Holmestrand Municipality
2005	Open	(Norway) Steinar Haugli	(Norway) Rino Olsen	(Norway) Hans Roger Loe	Moss in Moss Municipality
2005	Standard	(Norway) Hans Roger Loe	(Norway) Steinar Haugli	(Norway) Even Skaarer	Kongsvinger in Kongsvinger Municipality
2005	Production	(Norway) Even Skaarer	(Norway) Lars Syversen	(Norway) Morten Kløv	Moss in Moss Municipality
2006	Open	(Norway) Thomas Samuelsen	(Norway) Steinar Haugli	(Norway) Rino Olsen	Løvenskiold in Bærum Municipality
2006	Standard	(Norway) Even Skaarer	(Norway) Hans Roger Loe	(Norway) Steinar Haugli	Kongsvinger in Kongsvinger Municipality
2006	Production	(Norway) Even Skaarer	(Norway) Steinar Haugli	(Norway) Rino Olsen	
2006	Revolver	(Norway) Steinar Haugli	(Norway) Even Skaarer	(Norway) Ole Eilertsen	Bjørkelangen in Aurskog-Høland Municipality
2007	Open	(Norway) Steinar Haugli	(Norway) Kyrre Lee	(Norway) Hans Petter Lie	Løvenskiold in Bærum Municipality
2007	Standard	(Norway) Even Skaarer	(Norway) Rino Olsen	(Norway) Odd Strengenes	Eplerød in Holmestrand Municipality
2007	Production	(Norway) Even Skaarer	(Norway) Steinar Haugli	(Norway) Rino Olsen	Kongsvinger in Kongsvinger Municipality
2008	Open	(Norway) Thomas Samuelsen	(Norway) Odd Strengenes	(Norway) Kyrre Lee	Eplerød in Holmestrand Municipality
2008	Standard	(Norway) Even Skaarer	(Norway) Hans Petter Lie	(Norway) Rino Olsen	Løvenskiold in Bærum Municipality
2008	Production	(Norway) Even Skaarer	(Norway) Rino Olsen	(Norway) Odd Strengenes	Kongsvinger in Kongsvinger Municipality
2008	Revolver	(Norway) Rune Vikeby	(Norway) Ole Eilertsen	(Norway) Finn Einar Bugge	Kongsvinger in Kongsvinger Municipality
2009	Open	(Norway) Steinar Haugli	(Norway) Hans Loe	(Norway) Henning Wallgren	Hamar in Hamar Municipality
2009	Standard	(Norway) Rune Vikeby	(Norway) Steinar Haugli	(Norway) Hans Petter Lie	Løvenskiold in Bærum Municipality
2009	Production	(Norway) Steinar Haugli	(Norway) Hans Petter Lie	(Norway) Rune Vikeby	Kongsvinger in Kongsvinger Municipality
2009	Revolver	(Norway) Ole Eilertsen	(Norway) Finn Bugge	(Norway) Bjarte Drange	Eplerød in Holmestrand Municipality
2010	Open	(Norway) Thomas Samuelsen	(Norway) Hans Roger Loe	(Norway) Steinar Haugli	Eplerød in Holmestrand Municipality
2010	Production	(Norway) Steinar Haugli	(Norway) Hans Petter Kvarsnes	(Norway) Odd Strengenes	Løvenskiold in Bærum Municipality
2010	Revolver	(Norway) Rune Vikeby	(Norway) Ole Eilertsen	(Norway) Olof Lindskog	Eplerød in Holmestrand Municipality
2010	Standard	(Norway) Henning Wallgren	(Norway) Odd Strengenes	(Norway) Hans Roger Loe	Kongsvinger in Kongsvinger Municipality
2011	Open	(Norway) Steinar Haugli	(Norway) Hans Petter Lie	(Norway) Frank Sandås	Løvenskiold in Bærum Municipality
2011	Production	(Norway) Steinar Haugli	(Norway) Even Skaarer	(Norway) Morten Kløv	Kongsvinger in Kongsvinger Municipality
2011	Revolver	(Norway) Rune Vikeby	(Norway) Raymond B. Hansen	(Norway) Bjarte Drange	Løvenskiold in Bærum Municipality
2011	Standard	(Norway) Hans Petter Kvarsnes	(Norway) Hans Roger Loe	(Norway) Odd Strengenes	Hamar in Hamar Municipality
2012	Standard	(Norway) Even Skaarer	(Norway) Steinar Haugli	(Norway) Hans Petter Kvarsnes	Løvenskiold in Bærum Municipality
2012	Production	(Norway) Even Skaarer	(Norway) Hans Petter Kvarsnes	(Norway) Steinar Haugli	Kongsvinger in Kongsvinger Municipality
2012	Classic	(Norway) Odd Strengenes	(Norway) Frede Stenslie	(Norway) Rino Olsen	Moss in Moss Municipality
2013	Open	(Norway) Frank Sandås	(Norway) Thomas Samuelsen	(Norway) Steinar Haugli	Aurskog in Aurskog-Høland Municipality
2013	Standard	(Norway) Steinar Haugli	(Norway) Hans Roger Loe	(Norway) Rino Olsen	Moss in Moss Municipality
2013	Production	(Norway) Hans Petter Kvarsnes	(Norway)	(Norway)	Bjerkvik in Narvik Municipality
2013	Classic	(Norway) Even Skaarer	(Norway) Odd Strengenes	(Norway) Rino Olsen	Løvenskiold in Bærum Municipality
2013	Revolver	(Norway) Ole Eilertsen	(Norway) Rune Vikeby	(Norway) Brynjulv Afdal	Løvenskiold in Bærum Municipality
2014	Open	(Norway) Morten Kløv	(Norway) Bård Kristiansen	(Norway) Bjarte Drange	Vestvågøy Municipality in Lofoten
2014	Standard	(Norway) Steinar Haugli	(Norway) Even Skaarer	(Norway) Hans Petter Kvarsnes	Kongsvinger in Kongsvinger Municipality
2014	Production	(Norway) Odd Strengenes	(Norway) Morten Kløv	(Norway) Bård Kristiansen	Aurskog in Aurskog-Høland Municipality
2014	Classic	(Norway) Steinar Haugli	(Norway) Odd Strengenes	(Norway) Olav Kjelvei	Haugesund in Haugesund Municipality
2014	Revolver	(Norway) Rune Vikeby	(Norway)	(Norway)	Løvenskiold in Bærum Municipality
2015	Open	(Norway) Terje Finsrud	(Norway) Olav Kjelvei	(Norway) Steinar Haugli	Aurskog in Aurskog-Høland Municipality
2015	Production	(Norway) Bård Kristiansen	(Norway) Odd Strengenes	(Norway) Hans Petter Kvarsnes	Setermoen in Bardu Municipality
2015	Classic	(Norway) Steinar Haugli	(Norway) Odd Strengenes	(Norway) Olav Kjelvei	Haugesund in Haugesund Municipality
2015	Revolver	(Norway) Bjarte Drange	(Norway) Rune Vikeby	(Norway) Bård Johansen	Bergen in Bergen Municipality
2016	Open	(Norway) Steinar Haugli	(Norway) Thomas Samuelsen	(Norway) Are Johansen	Løvenskiold in Bærum Municipality
2016	Standard	(Norway) Hans Petter Kvarsnes	(Norway) Lars Syversen	(Norway) Odd Strengenes	Kongsvinger in Kongsvinger Municipality
2016	Production	(Norway) Bård Kristiansen	(Norway) Odd Strengenes	(Norway) Tor Ketil Krogh Olsen	Stavanger in Stavanger Municipality
2016	Classic	(Norway) Odd Strengenes	(Norway) Ole Eilertsen	(Norway) Frede Stenslie	Bergen in Bergen Municipality
2016	Revolver	(Norway) Ole Eilertsen	(Norway) Bjarte Drange	(Norway) Rune Vikeby	Haugesund in Haugesund Municipality
2017	Open	(Norway)	(Norway)	(Norway)	
2017	Standard	(Norway)	(Norway)	(Norway)	
2017	Production	(Norway)	(Norway)	(Norway)	
2017	Classic	(Norway)	(Norway)	(Norway)	
2017	Revolver	(Norway)	(Norway)	(Norway)	
2018	Open	(Norway) Anders Nerheim	(Norway) Terje Finsrud	(Norway) Thomas Samuelsen	Haugesund in Haugesund Municipality
2018	Standard	(Norway) Per A Hansen	(Norway) Steinar Haugli	(Norway) Odd Strengenes	Haugesund in Haugesund Municipality
2018	Production	(Norway) Hans Petter Kvarsnes	(Norway) Bård Kristiansen	(Norway) Jan Børge Søviknes	Haugesund in Haugesund Municipality
2018	Classic	(Norway) Frode Mølland	(Norway) Flemming Mark Pedersen	(Norway) Espen Birketvedt	Haugesund in Haugesund Municipality
2018	Revolver	(Norway) Kim-Ove Ellingsen	(Norway) Bjarte Drange	(Norway) Einar Bakke	Haugesund in Haugesund Municipality
2019	Open	(Norway)	(Norway)	(Norway)	Kongsvinger in Kongsvinger Municipality
2019	Production	(Norway)	(Norway)	(Norway)	Kongsvinger in Kongsvinger Municipality
2019	Classic	(Norway)	(Norway)	(Norway)	Kongsvinger in Kongsvinger Municipality
2019	Standard	(Norway)	(Norway)	(Norway)	Hringariki in Ringerike Municipality
2019	Production Optics	(Norway)	(Norway)	(Norway)	Hringariki in Ringerike Municipality
2019	Production D.O.L.	(Norway)	(Norway)	(Norway)	Hringariki in Ringerike Municipality
2019	Revolver	(Norway)	(Norway)	(Norway)	Hringariki in Ringerike Municipality

=== Lady category ===
Year	Division	Gold	Silver	Bronze	Venue
2016	Standard Lady	(Norway) Hilde Nakling	(Norway) Lene Kråkerø	(Norway) Ingunn Edvardsen	Kongsvinger in Kongsvinger Municipality

=== Junior category ===
Year	Division	Gold	Silver	Bronze	Venue

=== Senior category ===
Year	Division	Gold	Silver	Bronze	Venue
2016	Open Senior	(Norway) Erlend Berg	(Norway) Gunnar Roos	(Norway) Johnny Reyes	Løvenskiold in Bærum Municipality
2016	Standard Senior	(Norway) Bjørn Lindblad	(Norway) Folke Myrvang	(Norway) Tony Nordahl Tsigakis	Kongsvinger in Kongsvinger Municipality
2016	Production Senior	(Norway) Folke Myrvang	(Norway) Tåle Johnstad	(Norway) Martin Due	Stavanger in Stavanger Municipality

=== Super Senior category ===
Year	Division	Gold	Silver	Bronze	Venue

== See also ==
- Norwegian Rifle Championship
- Norwegian Tournament Championship
