= IPSC Nordic Rifle Championship =

Sport shooting competition

The IPSC Nordic Rifle Championship is a yearly IPSC level 3 rifle championship hosted in either Norway, Sweden, Finland or Denmark.

== History ==
- 2001 (Norway) Hell, 20-23. June
- 2002 (Norway) Steinsjøen
- 2003 (Denmark) Borris, 31 May - 1 June
- 2004 (Finland) Oulu, 10-11 July
- 2005 (Norway) Elverum, 16-18 September
- 2006 (Denmark) Borris, 27-28 May
- 2007 (Finland) Hamina, 14-15 July
- 2008 (Norway) Kongsberg, 12-13 July
- 2009 (No championship held)
- 2010 (Finland) Kouvola and Hamina, 10-11 July
- 2011 (Denmark) Copenhagen, 16-17 July
- 2012 (Sweden) Herrljunga, 14-15 July
- 2013 (Norway) Snillfjord, 6-7 July
- 2014 (Finland) Kouvola and Heinola, 23-24 August
- 2015 (Denmark) Copenhagen, 6-7 June
- 2016 (Norway) Snillfjord, 30-31 July
- 2017 (Sweden) Karlskoga, 12-13 August
- 2018 (Finland) Hanko and Kirkkonummi, 7-8 July

== Nordic champions ==
The following is a list of current and past champions.

=== Overall category ===
Year	Division	Gold	Silver	Bronze	Venue
2001		(Norway) Even Skaarer	(Norway) Odd Strengenes	(Norway) Frank Sandås	Hell, Norway
2002		(Norway) Even Skaarer	(Norway) Steinar Haugli	(Norway) Flemming Pedersen	Steinsjøen, Norway
2003		(Norway) Geir A. B. Wollmann	(Finland) Mika Riste	(Norway) Sverre Idland	Borris, Denmark
2004	Open	(Norway) Even Skaarer	(Norway) Frank Sandås	(Finland) Tommi Forsell	Oulu, Finland
2004	Standard	(Norway) Sverre Idland	(Finland) Marko Kervola	(Finland) Jari Karvonen	Oulu, Finland
2005	Open	(Finland) Raine Peltokoski	(Norway) Odd Strengenes	(Finland) Tommi Verho	Terningmoen, Norway
2005	Standard	(Norway) Sverre Idland	(Finland) Jari Rastas	(Norway) Runar Staveli	Terningmoen, Norway
2006	Open	(Norway) Frank Sandås	(Norway) Even Skaarer	(Finland) Raine Peltokoski	Borris, Denmark
2006	Standard	(Finland) Isto Hyyryaläinen	(Norway) Sverre Idland	(Norway) Per-Erik Salvesen	Borris, Denmark
2007	Open	(Finland) Hannu Uronen	(Norway) Frank Sandås	(Finland) Raine Peltokoski	Hamina, Finland
2007	Standard	(Norway) Sverre Idland	(Finland) Tommi Verho	(Finland) Isto Hyyryaläinen	Hamina, Finland
2008	Open	(Norway) Kristian Rommen	(Finland) Antti Hintsanen	(Finland) Mikael Kaislaranta	Heistadmoen, Kongsberg
2008	Standard	(Norway) Sverre Idland	(Finland) Mika Riste	(Finland) Jari Rastas	Heistadmoen, Kongsberg
2009	No championship held				
2010	Open	(Finland) Raine Peltokoski	(Finland) Petri H Runtti	(Finland) Juha Niemelä	Finland
2010	Standard	(Finland) Isto Hyyryläinen	(Finland) Mika J Riste	(Finland) Mikko Kuisma	Finland
2011	Open	(Denmark) Christian Thomsen	(Finland) Jarkko Laukia	(Finland) Kimmo Iso-Tuisku	Denmark
2011	Standard	(Finland) Isto Hyyryläinen	(Finland) Mikael Kaislaranta	(Finland) Mika Riste	Denmark
2012	Open	(Finland) Jarkko Laukia	(Norway) Frank Sandås	(Finland) Tuukka Jokinen	Herrljunga, Sweden
2012	Standard	(Finland) Mika Riste	(Finland) Mikael Kaislaranta	(Finland) Ilkka Kervinen	Herrljunga, Sweden
2013	Open	(Finland) Jarkko Laukia	(Norway) Kristian Rommen	(Norway) Frank Sandås	Snillfjord, Norway
2013	Standard	(Finland) Sami Hautamäki	(Norway) Sverre Idland	(Norway) Kristian Førde	Snillfjord, Norway
2013	Manual Open	(Norway) Jan Terje Jørgensen	(Norway) Lars Selven	(Norway) Geir Ivar Bredgaten	Snillfjord, Norway
2013	Manual Standard	(Norway) Lars Bjarne Oddan	(Norway) Frank Storsve	(Norway)	Snillfjord, Norway
2014	Open	(Finland) Raine Peltokoski	(Finland) Jarkko Laukia	(Finland) Teemu Rintala	Finland
2014	Standard	(Finland) Sami Hautamäki	(Finland) Timo Vehviläinen	(Finland) Ilkka Siitonen	Finland
2015	Open	(Finland) Jarkko Laukia	(Sweden) Rasmus Gyllenberg	(Norway) Michael Lindgjerdet	Denmark
2015	Standard	(Norway) Håvard Østgaard	(Finland) Sami Hautamäki	(Finland) Atte Vainionpää	Denmark
2015	Manual Open	(Norway) Christian Sandvik	(Norway) Tom Karlsen	(Denmark) Henrik Lerfeldt	Denmark
2016	Open	(Finland) Teemu Rintala	(Norway) Kristian Rommen	(Finland) Tuukka Jokinen	Snillfjord, Norway
2016	Standard	(Norway) Håvard Østgaard	(Finland) Atte Vainionpää	(Finland) Isto Hyyryläinen	Snillfjord, Norway
2016	Manual Open	(Norway) Jørgen Løe	(Norway) Jan Terje Jørgensen	(Norway) Torleiv Rime	Snillfjord, Norway
2017	Open	(Finland) Jarkko Laukia	(Norway) Vegard Fredriksen	(Sweden) Olle Ackehed	Karlskoga, Sweden
2017	Standard	(Finland) Sami Hautamäki	(Norway) Håvard Østgaard	(Finland) Atte Vainionpää	Karlskoga, Sweden
2017	Manual Open	(Sweden) Jiro Nihei	(Sweden) Jon Johansson	(Denmark) Jørgen Tang Nielsen	Karlskoga, Sweden
2018	Open	(Finland) Jarkko Laukia	(Sweden) Marcus Madsen	(Norway) Kristian Rommen	Hanko and Kirkkonummi, Finland
2018	Standard	(Finland) Sami Hautamäki	(Finland) Teemu Rintala	(Finland) Timo Vehviläinen	Hanko and Kirkkonummi, Finland

=== Lady category ===
Year	Division	Gold	Silver	Bronze	Venue
2010	Open	(Norway) Cathrine Normann	(Finland) Paula Takkumäki	(Finland) Ritva Kaase	Finland
2012	Open	(Sweden) Marianne Schön	(Sweden) Sofia Dohmen	(Sweden) Kattis Edfeldt	Herrljunga, Sweden
2016	Open Lady	(Norway) Emilie Skårild	(Sweden) Kristina Olsson	(Norway) Ann-Kathrin Mulstad	Snillfjord, Norway
2017	Open	(Finland) Marika Koskinen	(Norway) Emilie Skårild	(Sweden) Pia Clerté	Karlskoga, Sweden
2018	Open	(Norway) Ann-Kathrin Mulstad	(Finland) Marika Koskinen	(Finland) Miia Kaartinen	Hanko and Kirkkonummi, Finland

=== Junior category ===
Year	Division	Gold	Silver	Bronze	Venue
2007	Open	(Finland) Marko O Espo	(Finland) Toni Palmola	(Finland) Juha-Matti Jääskeläinen	Hamina, Finland

=== Senior category ===
Year	Division	Gold	Silver	Bronze	Venue
2006	Open	(Denmark) Tim Andersen			Borris, Denmark
2010	Open	(Finland) Ari Honkala	(Finland) Wilhelm R Backlund	(Finland) Markku Koistinen	Finland
2011	Open	(Sweden) Tomas Hemander	(Denmark) Kim Snerup Nielsen	(Sweden) Anders Nilsson	Denmark
2012	Open	(Denmark) Kim Snerup Nielsen	(Sweden) Anders Nilsson	(Sweden) Tomas Hermander	Herrljunga, Sweden
2014	Open	(Sweden) Johan Hansen	(Sweden) Johan Lindberg	(Finland) Pertti Karhunen	Finland
2014	Standard	(Norway) Sverre Idland	(Finland) Ilkka Kervinen	(Finland) Jari Prittinen	Finland
2015	Open	(Sweden) Johan Hansen	(Norway) Tore Fiborg	(Norway) Svein Helge Hennum	Copenhagen, Denmark
2015	Standard	(Finland) Mikael Kaislaranta	(Norway) Sverre Idland	(Finland) Atte Vainionpää	Copenhagen, Denmark
2016	Open	(Sweden) Johan Hansen	(Norway) Tåle Johnstad	(Sweden) Per Bergfeldt	Snillfjord, Norway
2017	Open	(Sweden) Per Bergfeldt	(Norway) Tore Fiborg	(Sweden) Patrik Gren	Karlskoga, Sweden
2018	Open	(Norway) Lars Syversen	(Finland) Mika Riste	(Sweden) Leif Madsen	Hanko and Kirkkonummi, Finland
2018	Standard	(Finland) Mikael Kaislaranta	(Finland) Ilkka Siitonen	(Norway) Sverre Idland	Hanko and Kirkkonummi, Finland

=== Super Senior category ===
Year	Division	Gold	Silver	Bronze	Venue
2010	Open	(Finland) Tarmo Rinne	(Finland) Markku Koistinen		Finland
2017	Open	(Sweden) Per Jonasson	(Sweden) Johan Mattsson	(Sweden) Walter Kitzinger	Karlskoga, Sweden
2018	Open	(Finland) Pertti Karhunen	(Sweden) Per Jonasson	(Finland) Veijo Ratilainen	Hanko and Kirkkonummi, Finland

== Teams ==
Year	Division	Gold	Silver	Bronze	Venue
2006	Open	Norway; Frank Sandås, Even Skaarer, Odd Strengenes, Henning Wallgren	Finland; Raine Peltokoski, Tommi Verho, Tommi Forsel, Mikael Kaislaranta	Denmark; Kim Nielsen, Peter Stausholm, Ib Rene Hansen, K B Svendsen	Borris, Denmark
2006	Standard	Finland; Isto Hyyryaläinen, Jari Rastas, Jarno Rantanen, Petri Syvänne	Norway; Sverre Idland, Per-Erik Salvesen, Øystein Grande, Runar Staveli	Denmark; Lars Hagemann, Carl Erik Sander, Michael Bickham, Per Jensen	Borris, Denmark
