= Vatne, Rogaland =

Village in Sandnes Municipality, Norway

Vatne
- Village
- Interactive map of Vatne
- Coordinates: 58.85618°N 5.78704°E
- Country: Norway
- Region: Western Norway
- County: Rogaland
- District: Jæren
- Municipality: Sandnes Municipality

Area
  - Total: 0.56 km^{2} (0.22 sq mi)
- Elevation: 38 m (125 ft)

Population (2025)
  - Total: 916
  - Density: 1,636/km^{2} (4,240/sq mi)
- Time zone: UTC+01:00 (CET)
  - Summer (DST): UTC+02:00 (CEST)
- Post Code: 4309 Sandnes

Vatne is a village in Sandnes Municipality in Rogaland county, Norway. The village lies in the borough of Hana, just about 3 kilometres (1.9 mi) northeast of the centre of the city of Sandnes. The Vatneleiren military base is located in Vatne at the mountain Hanafjellet.

It is considered a part of the Stavanger/Sandnes metropolitan area. The 0.56-square-kilometre (140-acre) village has a population (2025) of 916 and a population density of 1,636 inhabitants per square kilometre (4,240/sq mi).
