= Salen =

Salen may refer to:

== Places ==
- Salen, Ardnamurchan, a village on the Ardnamurchan peninsula in the highland region of Scotland.
- Salen, Mull, a village on the island of Mull in the Inner Hebrides of Scotland
- Sälen, in Dalarna, Sweden

== Surname ==
- Beate Salen, German Paralympic skier who competed in Alpine skiing at the 1994 Winter Paralympics
- Jeff Salen, American guitarist
- Katie Salen, American game designer
- Kenneth Salen, Norwegian sport shooter
- Salén, surname

== Other uses ==
- Salen ligand, a type of chemical compound used in chemistry
- Salen Kotch, main antagonist in Call of Duty: Infinite Warfare

== See also ==
- Salem (disambiguation)
