= Scandinavian Western Shooters =

Norwegian competition shooting association

Scandinavian Western Shooters (SWS), founded 1 October 1997, is the Norwegian association for cowboy action shooting under the Single Action Shooting Society. The association seeks to promote safe shooting competitions incorporating facts and fiction from the "old west", creating a romantic and nostalgic atmosphere. The firearms used are models produced before 1900, as well as replicas of those, and all competitors compete using cowboy nicknames and dressed up in cowboy themed clothing.

Cowboy action shooting in Norway emerged towards the end of the 1990s with the first CAS club being founded in 1997 under the name "1873-klubben Western Lawdogs". The founders of Western Lawdogs later also took initiative to form the SWS as a nationwide sports association.

== See also ==
- List of shooting sports organizations

=== Other shooting sport organizations in Norway ===
- Det frivillige Skyttervesen
- Norwegian Shooting Association
- Dynamic Sports Shooting Norway
- Norwegian Association of Hunters and Anglers
- Norwegian Benchrest Shooting Association
- Norwegian Black Powder Union
- Norwegian Biathlon Association
- Norwegian Metal Silhouette Association
