= IPSC Nordic Mini Rifle Championship =

Annual shooting competition

The IPSC Nordic Mini Rifle Championship is a yearly IPSC level 3 rifle championship hosted in either Norway, Sweden, Finland or Denmark.

== Nordic champions ==
The following is a list of current and past champions.

=== Overall category ===
Year	Division	Gold	Silver	Bronze	Venue
2016	Open	(Norway) Vegard Fredriksen	(Sweden) Johan Hansen	(Sweden) Erik Bjälkvall	Skepplanda, Gothenburg
2016	Standard	(Norway) Kenneth Handberg	(Finland) Ilkka Siitonen	(Sweden) Roland Dahlman	Skepplanda, Gothenburg

=== Lady category ===
Year	Division	Gold	Silver	Bronze	Venue
2016	Open	(Finland) Miia Kaartinene	(Sweden) Sofia Dohmen	(Sweden) Kristina Olsson	Skepplanda, Gothenburg

=== Senior category ===
Year	Division	Gold	Silver	Bronze	Venue
2016	Open	(Sweden) Johan Hansen	(Norway) Tore Fiborg	(Sweden) Johan Lindberg	Skepplanda, Gothenburg

== See also ==
- IPSC Nordic Handgun Championship
- IPSC Nordic Rifle Championship
- IPSC Nordic Shotgun Championship
