= Icelandic Shooting Sports Federation =

Icelandic sport shooting organization

The Icelandic Shooting Sports Federation (Skotíþróttasamband Íslands) is an organization on Iceland for sport shooting with pistol, rifle and shotgun. The federation was founded on 1979 February 16, and is internationally affiliated with the International Shooting Sport Federation (ISSF), European Shooting Confederation (ESC), Nordic Shooting Region (NSR) and World Benchrest Shooting Federation (WBSF).

== See also ==
- Norwegian Shooting Association
- Finnish Shooting Sport Federation
- Swedish Shooting Sport Federation
