= Nordic Shooting Region =

Union of some shooting associations from Nordic countries and the United Kingdom

- Sport: ISSF Shooting Sports
- Abbreviation: NSR
- Founded: 9 September 1921
- President: Erik Mouritsen (DSkyU)

Official website
- www.nordicshootingregion.eu

The Nordic Shooting Region (NSR), established in 1921, is a union of some of the shooting associations from Denmark, Estonia, Faroe Islands, Finland, Great Britain, Iceland, Norway and Sweden. NSR hosts Nordic championships for some of the ISSF disciplines within pistol, rifle, clay shooting and running target, in addition to some own Nordic disciplines.

== History ==
The Nordic Shooting Region was founded in 1921 in Stockholm as the "Nordic Short-Distance Shooting Association", following discussions at a Danish-Swedish shooting match in Copenhagen. The founding purpose of the organisation was to strengthen ties between sport shooters within the Nordic region, to organise a Nordic Championship and create the best conditions for Nordic shooters to succeed at Olympic Games and World Championships.

Norway hosted the first Nordic championships on the 21–22 July 1922.

During the 1960s and 1970s the Nordic Championships were well regarded on the international circuit, and Nordic officials filled many posts in the European Shooting Confederation (ESC) and International Shooting Sport Federation (ISSF). Great Britain applied for membership in 1971, which was approved on the 30th June 1973.

The importance of the Nordics declined during the 1980s as ISSF World Cups grew in prominence, both filling the calendar and demanding financial commitment from federations and athletes to travel and compete for Olympic quota places. Nordics were held every two years, in odd years from 1979 to 1989, and then in even-number years from 1990 onwards. In the 1990s, Senior events were only included on alternate Championships (every four years), with Juniors competing every two years. From 2006 to 2018, every Nordic Championship was just for Juniors. The 2020 Nordics were cancelled due to COVID-19. In 2022, Finland hosted a full Nordic Championship including Senior events - the first since 2004. A General Meeting was held concurrent with the Championship, in which the Danish Union was elected to the Chairmanship of the Region to oversea the 2024 Championships, as well as the revision of the Championship Rules, which were more than 15years old at the time.

In March 2022, the organisation issued an open letter endorsing the IOC condemnation of the Russian invasion of Ukraine. The NSR called for the European Shooting Confederation to convene an EGM and ensure their leadership was untainted by the war. The ESC President at the time was Russian-born Alexander Ratner. In November 2022, the organisation issued an open letter to all ISSF member federations expressing "deep concern regarding the development of the sport" and calling for stability in the rule book and competition programme. This followed several years of rules and format changes and tweaks to courses of fire - often at the behest of ISSF President Vladimir Lisin. Lisin had departed from the historical precedent of updating the rules once every 4 years (once per Olympic cycle). Lisin narrowly lost his bid for re-election to the ISSF Presidency in December 2022.

== Member Federations ==
- Danish Shooting Union (DSkyU)
- Estonian Rifle Association (Eesti Laskurliit)
- Faroe Islands Shooting Association (Skjótisamband Føroya)
- Finnish Shooting Sport Federation
- British Shooting (formerly Great Britain Target Shooting Federation)
- Icelandic Shooting Sports Federation (Skotíþróttasamband Íslands)
- Norwegian Shooting Association (NSF)
- Swedish Shooting Sport Federation (SvSF)
