= Norwegian Metallic Silhouette Association =

Shooting sport organization

The Norwegian Metallic Silhouette Association, Norwegian Norges Metallsilhuettforbund (NMF), is the Norwegian association for metallic silhouette shooting, a shooting sport originating from Mexico. NMF is affiliated internationally with International Metallic Silhouette Shooting Union (IMSSU). The shooting sport entered Norway in 1978, and NMF was established in 1981. Norway was the first country to hold the European Championship in Metallic Shooting at the Løvenskiold Shooting Range in 1986, an event which was repeated in 1988.

== See also ==
- List of shooting sports organizations

=== Other shooting sport organizations in Norway ===
- Det frivillige Skyttervesen
- Norwegian Shooting Association
- Dynamic Sports Shooting Norway
- Norwegian Association of Hunters and Anglers
- Norwegian Benchrest Shooting Association
- Norwegian Black Powder Union
- Norwegian Biathlon Association
- Scandinavian Western Shooters
