= IPSC Norwegian Tournament Championship =

Sport shooting competition in Norway

The IPSC Norwegian Tournament Championship is an IPSC level 3 Tournament Championship held once a year by Dynamic Sports Shooting Norway.

== Champions ==
The following is a list of current and previous champions.

=== Overall category ===
Year	Division	Gold	Silver	Bronze	Venue
2012	Open	(Norway) Frank Sandås	(Norway) Kristian Rommen	(Norway) Erlend Berg	Kyrksæterøra
2012	Standard	(Norway) Håvard Østgaard	(Norway) Rune Vikeby	(Norway) Kjetil Sletsjøe Svendsen	Kyrksæterøra
2014	Open	(Norway) Odd Strengenes	(Norway) Kenneth Salen	(Norway) Kristian Karlsen	Kyrksæterøra
2014	Standard	(Norway) Håvard Østgaard	(Norway) Øystein Lütcherath	(Norway) Lars Syversen	Kyrksæterøra
2015	Open	(Norway) Kristian Rommen	(Norway) Lars Syversen	(Norway) Kenneth Salen	Reviholen, Gjøvik
2015	Standard	(Norway) Håvard Østgaard	(Norway) Ronny Røise	(Norway) Frans Ringnes Aubert	Reviholen, Gjøvik
2016	Open	(Norway) Kenneth Salen	(Norway) Kristian Rommen	(Norway) Torgeir Rui	Setermoen
2016	Standard	(Norway) Håvard Østgaard	(Norway) Tor Olav Nordgård	(Norway) Ove Jonny Skundberg	Setermoen

=== Senior category ===
Year	Division	Gold	Silver	Bronze	Venue
2015	Open Senior	(Norway) Erlend Berg	(Norway) Tore Fiborg	(Norway) Rune Vikeby	Reviholen, Gjøvik

== See also ==
- Norwegian Handgun Championship
- Norwegian Rifle Championship
