= IPSC Danish Handgun Championship =

Sport shooting competition in Denmark

The IPSC Danish Handgun Championships are IPSC level 3 championships held once a year by the Danish Sport Shooting Association.

== Champions ==
The following is a list of previous and current champions.

=== Overall category ===
| Year | Division | Gold | Silver | Bronze | Venue |
|---|---|---|---|---|---|
| 1991 | | (Denmark) Flemming Pedersen | (Denmark) | (Denmark) | |
| 1992 | Open | (Denmark) Frants Pedersen | (Denmark) | (Denmark) | |
| 1992 | Standard | (Denmark) Ralf K. Jensen | (Denmark) | (Denmark) | |
| 1993 | Open | (Denmark) Frants Pedersen | (Denmark) | (Denmark) | |
| 1993 | Standard | (Denmark) Ralf K. Jensen | (Denmark) | (Denmark) | |
| 1994 | Open | (Denmark) Frants Pedersen | (Denmark) | (Denmark) | |
| 1994 | Standard | (Denmark) Ralf K. Jensen | (Denmark) | (Denmark) | |
| 1995 | Open | (Denmark) Frants Pedersen | (Denmark) | (Denmark) | |
| 1995 | Standard | (Denmark) Henrik F. Nielsen | (Denmark) | (Denmark) | |
| 1996 | Open | (Denmark) Frants Pedersen | (Denmark) | (Denmark) | |
| 1996 | Standard | (Denmark) Henrik F. Nielsen | (Denmark) Ralf K. Jensen | (Denmark) | |
| 1997 | Open | (Denmark) Frants Pedersen | (Denmark) | (Denmark) | |
| 1997 | Standard | (Denmark) Ralf K. Jensen | (Denmark) | (Denmark) | |
| 1998 | Open | (Denmark) Frants Pedersen | (Denmark) | (Denmark) | |
| 1998 | Standard | (Denmark) Ralf K. Jensen | (Denmark) | (Denmark) | |
| 1999 | Open | (Denmark) Frants Pedersen | (Denmark) | (Denmark) | |
| 1999 | Standard | (Denmark) Ralf K. Jensen | (Denmark) | (Denmark) | |
| 2000 | Open | (Denmark) Frants Pedersen | (Denmark) | (Denmark) | |
| 2000 | Standard | (Denmark) Ralf K. Jensen | (Denmark) | (Denmark) | |
| 2001 | Standard | (Denmark) Ralf K. Jensen | (Denmark) | (Denmark) | |
| 2002 | Open | (Denmark) Frants Pedersen | (Denmark) | (Denmark) | |
| 2002 | Standard | (Denmark) Ralf K. Jensen | (Denmark) | (Denmark) | |
| 2002 | Production | (Denmark) Henrik F. Nielsen | (Denmark) | (Denmark) | |
| 2003 | Open | (Denmark) Frants Pedersen | (Denmark) Erik Rasmussen | (Denmark) Keld Knudsen | |
| 2003 | Standard | (Denmark) Ralf K. Jensen | (Denmark) Henrik F. Nielsen | (Denmark) Bo Stampe Madsen | |
| 2003 | Production | (Denmark) Jack Rømer | (Denmark) Per Jensen | (Denmark) | |
| 2003 | Revolver | (Denmark) Hans Jørgen Jensen | (Denmark) | (Denmark) | |
| 2004 | Open | (Denmark) Frants Pedersen | (Denmark) Erik Rasmussen | (Denmark) Keld Knudsen | |
| 2004 | Standard | (Denmark) Ralf K. Jensen | (Denmark) Bo Stampe Madsen | (Denmark) Mats O. Bäckström | |
| 2004 | Production | (Denmark) Jack Rømer | (Denmark) Henrik F. Nielsen | (Denmark) Lars Hagemann | |
| 2004 | Revolver | (Denmark) Frants Pedersen | (Denmark) Kim Pedersen | (Denmark) Finn Pedersen | |
| 2005 | Open | (Denmark) Frants Pedersen | (Denmark) | (Denmark) | |
| 2005 | Standard | (Denmark) Ralf K. Jensen | (Denmark) | (Denmark) | |
| 2005 | Production | (Denmark) Henrik F. Nielsen | (Denmark) | (Denmark) | |
| 2006 | Open | (Denmark) Frants Pedersen | (Denmark) | (Denmark) | |
| 2006 | Standard | (Denmark) Ralf K. Jensen | (Denmark) | (Denmark) | |
| 2006 | Production | (Denmark) Henrik F. Nielsen | (Denmark) | (Denmark) | |
| 2006 | Revolver | (Denmark) Frants Pedersen | (Denmark) | (Denmark) | |
| 2007 | Open | (Denmark) Henrik F. Nielsen | (Denmark) Steen Franta | (Denmark) Frants Pedersen | |
| 2007 | Standard | (Denmark) Mats Bäckström | (Denmark) Christian Thomsen | (Denmark) Kristian Petersen | |
| 2007 | Production | (Denmark) Lars Hagemann | (Denmark) Peter Schieck | (Denmark) Søren W. Larsen | |
| 2007 | Revolver | (Denmark) Hans Jørgen Jensen | (Denmark) | (Denmark) | |
| 2008 | Open | (Denmark) Frants Pedersen | (Denmark) Steen Franta | (Denmark) Karsten Sørensen | |
| 2008 | Standard | (Denmark) Ralf K. Jensen | (Denmark) Ulrik Birkjær | (Denmark) Christian Thomsen | |
| 2008 | Production | (Denmark) Lars Hagemann | (Denmark) Søren W. Larsen | (Denmark) Carsten Heidelbach | |
| 2008 | Revolver | (Denmark) Henrik F. Nielsen | (Denmark) Steen Pico Nielsen | (Denmark) Hans Jørgen Jensen | |
| 2009 | Open | (Denmark) Frants Pedersen | (Denmark) Steen Franta | (Denmark) Karsten Sørensen | |
| 2009 | Standard | (Denmark) Ulrik Birkjær | (Denmark) Christian Thomsen | (Denmark) Bo Stampe Madsen | |
| 2009 | Production | (Denmark) Lars Hagemann | (Denmark) Henrik F. Nielsen | (Denmark) Peter Davis | |
| 2009 | Revolver | (Denmark) Kristian Petersen | (Denmark) Steen Pico Nielsen | (Denmark) Finn Johansen | |
| 2010 | Open | (Denmark) Eli Huttner | (Denmark) Steen Franta | (Denmark) K.B. Svendsen | |
| 2010 | Standard | (Denmark) Ralf K. Jensen | (Denmark) Christian Thomsen | (Denmark) Ulrik Birkjær | |
| 2010 | Production | (Denmark) Lars Hagemann | (Denmark) Søren W. Larsen | (Denmark) Christian Ditlev Jensen | |
| 2010 | Revolver | (Denmark) Kristian Petersen | (Denmark) | (Denmark) | |
| 2011 | Open | (Denmark) Eli Huttner | (Denmark) Peter Schieck | (Denmark) Erik Rasmussen | |
| 2011 | Standard | (Denmark) Bo Stampe Madsen | (Denmark) Rene Mortensen | (Denmark) Henrik Lindberg | |
| 2011 | Production | (Denmark) Lars Hagemann | (Denmark) Jack Rømer | (Denmark) Peter Davis | |
| 2011 | Revolver | (Denmark) Henrik F. Nielsen | (Denmark) Anders Hatting Larsen | (Denmark) Erkki Søndergaard | |
| 2012 | Open | (Denmark) Eli Huttner | (Denmark) Steen Franta | (Denmark) Peter Schieck | Rooster Mountain, Hillerød, Denmark |
| 2012 | Production | (Denmark) Lars Hagemann | (Denmark) Jack Rømer | (Denmark) Henrik F. Nielsen | Rooster Mountain, Hillerød, Denmark |
| 2012 | Revolver | (Denmark) Henrik F. Nielsen | (Denmark) Erkki Søndergaard | (Denmark) Kristian H. Petersen | Dall IPSC Challenge, Aalborg, Denmark |
| 2012 | Standard | (Denmark) Ulrik Birkjær | (Denmark) Ralf K. Jensen | (Denmark) Bo Stampe Madsen | Dall IPSC Challenge, Aalborg, Denmark |
| 2013 | Open | (Denmark) Eli Huttner | (Denmark) Frants Pedersen | (Denmark) Carsten Samuelsen | Rooster Mountain, Hillerød, Denmark |
| 2013 | Production | (Denmark) Lars Hagemann | (Denmark) Andreas Danko | (Denmark) Morten Holm | Rooster Mountain, Hillerød, Denmark |
| 2013 | Revolver | (Denmark) Erikki Søndergaard | (Denmark) Michael Low | | Rooster Mountain, Hillerød, Denmark |
| 2013 | Standard | (Denmark) Ralf K. Jensen | (Denmark) Bo Stampe Madsen | (Denmark) Ebbe Wolff | Rooster Mountain, Hillerød, Denmark |
| 2014 | Open | (Denmark) Peter Schieck | (Denmark) Gert Hansen | (Denmark) Carsten Samuelsen | Dall IPSC Challenge, Aalborg, Denmark |
| 2014 | Production | (Denmark) Jack Rømer | (Denmark) Andreas Danko | (Denmark) Lars Hagemann | Dall IPSC Challenge, Aalborg, Denmark |
| 2014 | Revolver | (Denmark) Henrik F. Nielsen | (Denmark) Michael Low | (Denmark) Michael Loye | Rooster Mountain, Hillerød, Denmark |
| 2014 | Standard | (Denmark) Bo Stampe Madsen | (Denmark) Lars Hagemann | (Denmark) Rene Mortensen | Rooster Mountain, Hillerød, Denmark |
| 2015 | Classic | (Denmark) Jack Rømer | (Denmark) Gert Erling Hansen | | |
| 2015 | Open | (Denmark) Michael Gjelsø | (Denmark) Peter Davis | (Denmark) Carsten Samuelsen | |
| 2015 | Production | (Denmark) Lars Hagemann | (Denmark) Jens Arnfast | (Denmark) Andreas Danko | |
| 2015 | Revolver | (Denmark) Henrik F. Nielsen | (Denmark) Ole Mortensen | (Denmark) Anders Hatting Larsen | |
| 2015 | Standard | (Denmark) Andreas Danko | (Denmark) Ralf K. Jensen | (Denmark) Rene Mortensen | |
| 2016 | Classic | (Denmark) Jack Rømer | (Denmark) Noe Nielsen | (Denmark) Gert Erling Hansen | |
| 2016 | Open | (Denmark) Frants Pedersen | (Denmark) Michael Gjelsø | (Denmark) Peter Davis | |
| 2016 | Production | (Denmark) Andreas Danko | (Denmark) Bo Stampe Madsen | (Denmark) Mads Andersen | |
| 2016 | Revolver | (Denmark) Henrik F. Nielsen | (Denmark) Anders Hatting Larsen | (Denmark) Ole Mortensen | |
| 2016 | Standard | (Denmark) Ralf K. Jensen | (Denmark) Rene Mortensen | (Denmark) Andreas Danko | |
| 2017 | Classic | (Denmark) Andreas Danko | (Denmark) Noe Nielsen | (Denmark) Jack Rømer | Rooster Mountain, Hillerød, Denmark |
| 2017 | Open | (Denmark) Stefan Fischer | (Denmark) Michael Gjelsø | (Denmark) Peter Davis | Dall IPSC Challenge, Aalborg, Denmark |
| 2017 | Production | (Denmark) Andreas Danko | (Denmark) Jens Arnfast | (Denmark) Bo Stampe Madsen | Dall IPSC Challenge, Aalborg, Denmark |
| 2017 | Revolver | (Denmark) Henrik F. Nielsen | (Denmark) Ole Mortensen | (Denmark) Michael Low | Rooster Mountain, Hillerød, Denmark |
| 2017 | Standard | (Denmark) Ralf K. Jensen | (Denmark) Rene Mortensen | (Denmark) Bo Stampe Madsen | Rooster Mountain, Hillerød, Denmark |
| 2018 | Classic | (Denmark) Andreas Danko | (Denmark) Mads Peter Bach | (Denmark) Jacob Larsen | Dall IPSC Challenge, Aalborg, Denmark |
| 2018 | Open | (Denmark) Stefan Fischer | (Denmark) Peter Davis | (Denmark) Kristian Bartholin | DSF DM Open 2018, Copenhagen, Denmark |
| 2018 | Production | (Denmark) Lars Hagemann | (Denmark) Morten Holm | (Denmark) Mikkel Sloth Pedersen | DSF DM Open 2018, Copenhagen, Denmark |
| 2018 | Production Optics | (Denmark) Ebbe Wolff | (Denmark) | (Denmark) | DSF DM Open 2018, Copenhagen, Denmark |
| 2018 | Revolver | (Denmark) Henrik F. Nielsen | (Denmark) Ole Mortensen | (Denmark) Anders Hatting Larsen | Dall IPSC Challenge, Aalborg, Denmark |
| 2018 | Standard | (Denmark) Mads Andersen | (Denmark) Bo Stampe Madsen | (Denmark) Sissal Skaale | DSF DM Open 2018, Copenhagen, Denmark |
| 2019 | Classic | (Denmark) Jack Rømer | (Denmark) Jacob Larsen | (Denmark) Mads Peter Bach | Copenhagen Open, Copenhagen, Denmark |
| 2019 | Open | (Denmark) Stefan Fischer | (Denmark) Frants Pedersen | (Denmark) Carsten Samuelsen | Dall IPSC Challenge, Aalborg, Denmark |
| 2019 | Production | (Denmark) Pavel Ibenforth | (Denmark) Bo Stampe Madsen | (Denmark) Kristian Larsen | Dall IPSC Challenge, Aalborg, Denmark |
| 2019 | Production Optics | (Denmark) Ebbe Wolff | (Denmark) Andreas Danko | (Denmark) Jens Arnfast | Dall IPSC Challenge, Aalborg, Denmark |
| 2019 | Production Optics Light | (Denmark) Ebbe Wolff | (Denmark) Pavel Ibenforth | (Denmark) Dennis Jakobsen | Copenhagen Open, Copenhagen, Denmark |
| 2019 | Revolver | (Denmark) Henrik F. Nielsen | (Denmark) David K. Grainger | (Denmark) Rasmus Milling Varmdal | Copenhagen Open, Copenhagen, Denmark |
| 2019 | Standard | (Denmark) Bo Stampe Madsen | (Denmark) Mads Andersen | (Denmark) Kim Frandsen | Copenhagen Open, Copenhagen, Denmark |
