= Idland =

Idland is a surname. Notable people with the surname include:

- Åse Idland (born 1973), Norwegian biathlete
- Kasper Idland (1918–1968), Norwegian resistance member
- Sverre Idland, Norwegian sport shooter
