= Frank Sandås =

Norwegian sport shooter

Medal record
IPSC
Representing Norway
IPSC Nordic Handgun Championship
Gold medal – first place	2012 Hillerød	Open
IPSC Nordic Rifle Championship
Bronze medal – third place	2001 Hell	Open
Silver medal – second place	2004 Oulu	Open
Gold medal – first place	2006 Borris	Open
Silver medal – second place	2007 Hamina	Open
IPSC Norwegian Handgun Championship
Bronze medal – third place	2001 Løvenskiold	Open
Gold medal – first place	2013 Aurskog	Open
IPSC Norwegian Tournament Championship
Gold medal – first place	2012 Kyrksæterøra	Open

Frank Sandås is a Norwegian sport shooter who won the IPSC Nordic Rifle Championship (2006), IPSC Nordic Handgun Championship (2012) and the IPSC Norwegian Tournament Championship (2012).
