= National Rifle Association of Norway =

Norwegian organization for shooting sports

National Rifle Association of Norway Norwegian Civilian Marksmanship Association
- Det frivillige Skyttervesen
- Abbreviation: DFS
- Predecessor: Folkevæpningssamlagene and shooting clubs in the Centralforeningen
- Formation: 1 July 1893
- Registration no.: 943 942 102
- Headquarters: Oslo
- Region served: Norway
- General Secretary: Jarle Tvinnereim
- President: Bernt Brovold
- Parent organization: The Norwegian Storting
- Website: dfs.no

Det frivillige Skyttervesen (DFS) (lit. 'The Voluntary Shooters Association'), known in English as the National Rifle Association of Norway, and by DFS themselves as the Norwegian Civilian Marksmanship Association since 2020, is a civilian marksmanship association in Norway and the largest shooting sport organization in Norway. It was created in 1893 by Norway's Storting to promote practical shooting skills within the Norwegian people, thereby empowering the national defence. DFS is sponsored by the Norwegian parliament and receives annually about 30 million Norwegian krones to fulfil their purpose. DFS collaborates with various departments in the Norwegian Armed Forces by educating shooting instructors. They also lend their shooting ranges for free to the Norwegian Home Guard. DFS is under the patronage of Harald V of Norway.

DFS organizes over 750 shooting clubs all over Norway and had in 2017 approximately 138,000 members. This makes it one of the largest sports organizations in Norway.

The 6.5×55mm cartridge has been the main standard cartridge in the organization for more than 120 years. The current main standard rifle is the SIG Sauer 200 STR in 6.5×55mm and .22 LR, and before that Krag–Jørgensen and various Mauser variants (i.e. M67, M59 and K98k "Heimeverns-Mauser") were used.

Det frivillige Skyttervesen can be compared to the American Civilian Marksmanship Program.

== History ==
Shooting sports in Norway can be traced back to Det bergenske Skydeselskab (Bergen Shooting Club) which was founded in 1769.

During the 1800s, the defense oriented shooting movement began, and in 1861 this form of shooting was gathered under the Centralforeningen for Udbrædelse af Legemsøvelser og Vaabenbrug (later The Norwegian Confederation of Sports). In 1882, the shooting sports in Norway was split with the founding of the Folkevæpningssamlags as a competing organisation to Centralforeningen.

In 1893, the Norwegian Civilian Marksmanship Association (Det frivillige Skyttervesen) was founded, with all the shooting clubs in the Centralforeningen and Folkevæpningssamlags being gathered under one organisation with the goal to strengthen Norway's defense capabilities, especially by training the people in shooting and by ensuring that modern firearms became widespread.

== Mission statement ==
The mission of Det frivillige Skyttervesen is to promote a healthy gun culture and marksmanship skills, as well as to secure a decentralization of shooting ranges, for the benefit of the Norwegian Armed Forces and the Norwegian society.

== Competitions ==
DFS competitions are only shot with rifles, and the competition formats are the following.

- Bullseye shooting (baneskyting), the most popular discipline in DFS with some similarities to NRA High power. Shot at a 10 ring target at the distances of 100 m for juniors and veterans, and 200–300 m for seniors.
- Field shooting (feltskyting), a long range shooting discipline arranged outside in the terrain in the winter. Targets are scored either hit, inner hit or miss. Juniors and veterans shoot at 100 m, while seniors shoot at varying unknown distances up to 600 m.
- Field rapid shooting (felthurtigskyting) is a speed shooting event where the shooter has to engage three different targets placed at different unknown distances with one shot each in the shortest time possible.
- Small-bore shooting indoor at 15 m for all classes with .22 lr rifles at a 10 ring target, popular in the winter.
- Nordic field biathlon skifeltskyting), a form of biathlon in the winter with skiing and shooting.
- Nordic shooting with cross-country running (skogsløp or springskytte), a form of biathlon in the summer with running and shooting.
- Stang shooting (stangskyting), a speed shooting competition where the shooter has two periods of 25 seconds to get as many hits as possible on a target at an unknown distance, with an unlimited number of rounds. Stang shooting is named after Georg Stang, a previous Norwegian Minister of Defence.

== Landsskytterstevnet ==
Every year, the National Championship Landsskytterstevnet is held in different cities in Norway. The event has between 4000 and 6000 participants and is shown on national television. Landsskytterstevnet is one of the largest sporting events in Norway.

== See also ==
- List of shooting sports organizations

Other shooting sport organizations in Norway

- Dynamic Sports Shooting Norway
- Norwegian Association of Hunters and Anglers
- Norwegian Benchrest Shooting Association
- Norwegian Biathlon Association
- Norwegian Black Powder Union
- Norwegian Metal Silhouette Association
- Norwegian Shooting Association
- Scandinavian Western Shooters
