= Hana Church =

Church in Rogaland, Norway

- Hana kirke
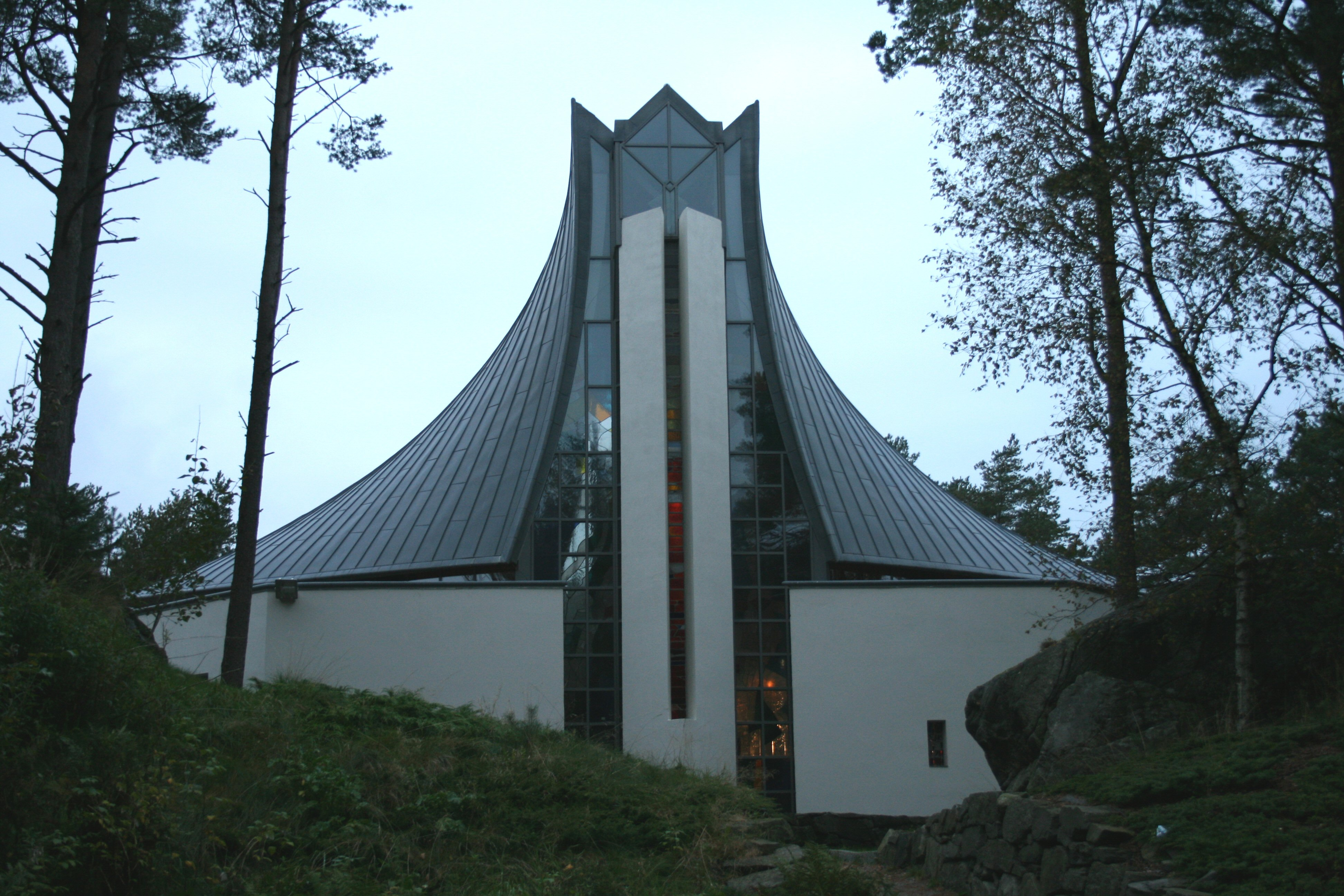
- View of the church
- Hana Church
- 58.864109°N 5.757844°E
- Location: Sandnes, Rogaland
- Country: Norway
- Denomination: Church of Norway
- Churchmanship: Evangelical Lutheran

History
- Status: Parish church
- Founded: 1997
- Consecrated: 1997

Architecture
- Functional status: Active
- Architect: Kolbjørn Jensen
- Architectural type: Octagonal
- Completed: 1997

Specifications
- Capacity: 415
- Materials: Concrete

Administration
- Diocese: Stavanger bispedømme
- Deanery: Sandnes prosti
- Parish: Hana

Hana Church (Norwegian: Hana kirke) is a parish church of the Church of Norway in the large Sandnes Municipality in Rogaland county, Norway. It is located in the borough of Hana in the city of Sandnes in the far western part of the municipality. It sits along the eastern shore of the Gandsfjorden, just north of the city centre. It is the church for the Hana parish which is part of the Sandnes prosti (deanery) in the Diocese of Stavanger. The white and gray, concrete church was built in an octagonal design in 1997, using designs by the architect Kolbjørn Jensen from the architectural firm Signatur Arkitekter. The church seats about 415 people.

== See also ==
- List of churches in Rogaland
