= Håvard Østgaard =

Norwegian sport shooter

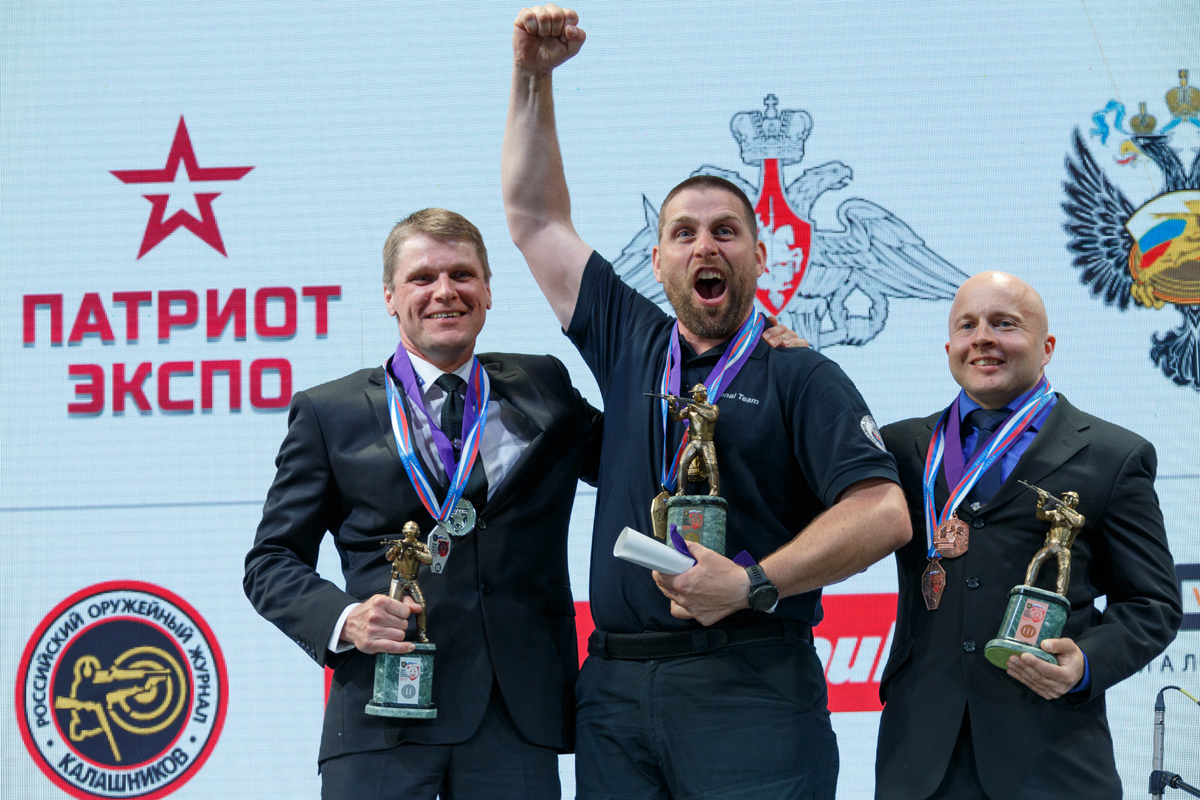
- Håvard Østgaard (center) at the podium of the 2017 IPSC Rifle World Shoot
Medal record
IPSC
Representing Norway
IPSC Rifle World Shoot
Gold medal – first place	2017	Standard
IPSC Nordic Rifle Championship
Gold medal – first place	2015	Standard
Gold medal – first place	2016	Standard
IPSC Norwegian Rifle Championship
Gold medal – first place	2014	Standard
Gold medal – first place	2015	Standard
Gold medal – first place	2016	Standard
IPSC Norwegian Tournament Championship
Gold medal – first place	2012	Standard
Gold medal – first place	2014	Standard
Gold medal – first place	2015	Standard
Gold medal – first place	2016	Standard

Håvard Østgaard is a Norwegian sport shooter who won the 2017 IPSC Rifle World Shoot in the Standard division. In 2015, he placed 4th at the IPSC European Rifle Championship. Østgaard also has numerous Norwegian and Nordic titles having won the IPSC Nordic Rifle Championship two times (2015 and 2016), the IPSC Norwegian Rifle Championship three times (2014, 2015 and 2016) and the IPSC Norwegian Tournament Championship four times (2012, 2014, 2015 and 2016).

== See also ==
- Teemu Rintala, Finnish sport shooter
- Sami Hautamäki, Finnish sport shooter
- Josh Froelich, American sport shooter
