= Danish Sport Shooting Association =

The Danish Sport Shooting Association
- Dansk Sportsskytte Forbund
- Formation: 7 August 1991
- Chairman: Tim Andersen
- Parent organization: International Practical Shooting Confederation; World Association PPC 1500; International Metallic Silhouette Shooting Union
- Website: dsf.dk

The Danish Sport Shooting Association, Danish Dansk Sportsskytte Forbund (DSF), is the Danish association for practical shooting under the International Practical Shooting Confederation. DSF is also a member of Dansk Skytte Union (The Danish Shooting Union).
