= Norwegian Association of Hunters and Anglers =

- Norges Jeger- og Fiskerforbund
- Formation: 10 February 1871
- Website: njff.no

The Norwegian Association of Hunters and Anglers (Norwegian: Norges Jeger- og Fiskerforbund, NJFF) is a Norwegian organization for hunters and sport fishers. It was established in 1871, and in 2019 had around 110,000 members. The organizations primary concern is to secure the opportunies for hunting and fishing for the general public, both now and in the future.

== See also ==
=== Other shooting sport organizations in Norway ===
- Norwegian Shooting Association
- Det frivillige Skyttervesen
- Dynamic Sports Shooting Norway
- Norwegian Benchrest Shooting Association
- Norwegian Black Powder Union
- Norwegian Biathlon Association
- Norwegian Metal Silhouette Association
- Scandinavian Western Shooters
