= Flemming Pedersen (sport shooter) =

Danish-Norwegian competitive shooter (born 1958)

Personal information
- Born: 1958 (age 67–68)
Medal record
IPSC
Representing Denmark
IPSC Danish Handgun Championship
Gold medal – first place	1991
Representing Norway
IPSC European Handgun Championship
Gold medal – first place	1992 Barcelona
IPSC Nordic Handgun Championship
Gold medal – first place	1985 Løvenskiold
IPSC Norwegian Handgun Championship
Bronze medal – third place	1982 Ulven
Gold medal – first place	1985 Tveit
Gold medal – first place	1986 Vatneleiren
Silver medal – second place	1987 Løvenskiold
Silver medal – second place	1988 Tveit
Silver medal – second place	1989 Skien
Silver medal – second place	1990 Lillestrøm
Gold medal – first place	1991 Tveit
Gold medal – first place	1992 Løvenskiold
Gold medal – first place	1994 Tveit	Open
Gold medal – first place	1995 Risør	Open
Silver medal – second place	1996 Sessvollmoen	Open
Gold medal – first place	1996 Tveit	Standard
Gold medal – first place	1997 Voss	Open
Gold medal – first place	1998 Nesbyen	Standard
Gold medal – first place	2000	Standard
IPSC Nordic Rifle Championship
Bronze medal – third place	2002 Steinsjøen	Open
IPSC Norwegian Rifle Championship
Gold medal – first place	1999 Steinsjøen
Gold medal – first place	2000 Steinsjøen
Bronze medal – third place	2002 Steinsjøen	Open

Flemming Mark Pedersen is a Danish-Norwegian competitive shooter who won the 1992 IPSC European Handgun Championship and 1985 IPSC Nordic Handgun Championship. He is also 10 times IPSC Norwegian Handgun Champion and 2 times IPSC Norwegian Rifle Champion.
