= Jonsvatnet shooting range =

Norwegian shooting range

Jonsvatnet shooting range on the map of Trøndelag county, Norway,

Jonsvatnet shooting range, Norwegian Jonsvatnet skytebane, can refer to a set of shooting ranges that together makes up for the largest civilian shooting range complex around the city of Trondheim in Norway. The ranges of Nidaros Skytterlag, Trondheim Jeger- og Fiskerforening, and Trondhjems Pistolklubb are situated close to each other at the north end of Digresmyra wetlands, while the range of Nidaros Jaktskytterklubb is on the south end of Digresmyra.

== Nidaros Jaktskytterklubb ==
63.354°N 10.524°E
Nidaros Jaktskytterklubb (lit. Nidaros Hunting-Shooting Club) is situated at the south end of the Digresmyra wetlands, and has a rifle range and several shotgun ranges for trap, skeet and sporting clays.

== Nidaros Skytterlag ==
63.3655°N 10.5266°E
The outdoor range of Nidaros skytterlag (lit. Nidaros shooting club) lays at the north end of the Digresmyra wetland, and was built in 1933. It goes under the name Nidaros skytebane. There are electronic targets placed at 100 and 300 m, and backstops for targets at 50, 100, 150, 200 and 500 m, as well as self indicating targets at 425 and 585 m. The range is also used by Nidaros Benkeskytterklubb Nidaros Skytterlag also has a club house and an indoor 15 m firing range.

== Trondheim Jeger- og Fiskerforening ==
63.3623°N 10.5249°E
Trondheim Jeger- og Fiskerforening (lit. Trondheim Hunters and Anglers Club) have an own club house and three shooting ranges for clay pigeon shooting.

== Trondhjems Pistolklubb ==
63.3614°N 10.5242°E
Trondhjems Pistolklubb (lit. Trondheim Pistol Club) has a 25 m range with 40 firing lanes, a 50 m range with 10 firing lanes, and 14 field courses with varied distances. The clubhouse is adapted for wheelchair users. The range is also used by Trondheim Feltskyttere.

== See also ==
- Løvenskiold shooting range, the largest civilian shooting range in the city of Oslo, Norway
