= Kristian Rommen =

Norwegian sport shooter

Medal record
IPSC
Representing Norway
IPSC Nordic Rifle Championship
Gold medal – first place	2008 Heistadmoen	Open
Silver medal – second place	2013 Snillfjord	Open
Silver medal – second place	2016 Snillfjord	Open
Bronze medal – third place	2018 Hanko	Open
IPSC Norwegian Rifle Championship
Bronze medal – third place	2006 Terningmoen	Open
Gold medal – first place	2007 Evjemoen	Open
Gold medal – first place	2008 Heistadmoen	Open
Gold medal – first place	2009 Sessvollmoen	Open
Gold medal – first place	2010 Oksvoll	Open
Gold medal – first place	2011 Revhiholen	Open
Gold medal – first place	2012 Revhiholen	Open
Gold medal – first place	2013 Heistadmoen	Open
Silver medal – second place	2016 Setermoen	Open
Silver medal – second place	2017 Revhiholen	Open
Gold medal – first place	2018 Revhiholen	Open
IPSC Norwegian Tournament Championship
Silver medal – second place	2012 Kyrksæterøra	Open
Gold medal – first place	2015 Reviholen	Open
Silver medal – second place	2016 Setermoen	Open

Kristian Rommen is a Norwegian sport shooter who has won the IPSC Norwegian Rifle Championship 7 times, and was for a longer period coach for the IPSC Norwegian national rifle team.
