= Norwegian Benchrest Shooting Association =

Norwegian sport association

The Norwegian Benchrest Shooting Association, Norwegian Norges Benkeskytterforbund (NBSF), is the Norwegian association for benchrest shooting under the World Benchrest Shooting Federation (WBSF), as well as the long range disciplines 500 UNL and F-Class. The organization was founded in 1996

While most benchrest matches in Norway and the rest of the world are held at 100 and 200 meters, 500 m benchrest matches are a unique Norwegian benchrest discipline which has been considered as a crossover discipline between benchrest and long range shooting. The first 500 m benchrest event in Norway was conducted in March 2007.

The long range discipline F-Class shooting was added as a discipline in 2011, and the first Norwegian national F-Class championship was held in 2017.

Formerly NBSF had a members magazine called Benkeskytteren (The Benchrest Shooter).

== Shooting disciplines ==
Benchrest disciplines

- BR50
- WBSF Light Varmint
- WBSF Heavy Varmint
- National Hunter
- National Sporter

Long range disciplines

- F-Class
- 500 meter unlimited (UNL) (National benchrest discipline)

== See also ==
=== Other shooting sport organizations in Norway ===
- Norwegian Shooting Association
- Det frivillige Skyttervesen
- Dynamic Sports Shooting Norway
- Norwegian Association of Hunters and Anglers
- Norwegian Black Powder Union
- Norwegian Biathlon Association
- Norwegian Metal Silhouette Association
- Scandinavian Western Shooters
