= Hana, Norway =

Borough in Sandnes, Norway

Bydel Hana
- Borough
- Coat of arms

- Location within Sandnes Municipality
- Interactive map of Bydel Hana
- Coordinates: 58°51′N 05°46′E
- Country: Norway
- Region: Western Norway
- County: Rogaland
- District: Jæren
- City: Sandnes

Area
  - Total: 36.1 km^{2} (13.9 sq mi)

Population (2016)
  - Total: 8,196
  - Density: 227/km^{2} (588/sq mi)
- Time zone: UTC+01:00 (CET)
  - Summer (DST): UTC+02:00 (CEST)
- Post Code: 4309 Sandnes

Hana is a borough of the city of Sandnes which lies in the western part of the large Sandnes Municipality in Rogaland county, Norway. The 36.1-square-kilometre (13.9 sq mi) borough is located just east of the city centre of Sandnes on the east side of the Gandsfjorden. It has a population (in 2016) of 8,196.

Hanafjellet mountain is located in the northeastern part of the borough. A cave in Hana used by the army during World War II is a tourist attraction. The local sports team is Hana IL. Hana Church is located in the borough also. The village of Vatne is in Hana as is the Vatneleiren military base.
