= Odd Strengenes =

Norwegian sport shooter

Medal record
IPSC
Representing Norway
IPSC Nordic Handgun Championship
Silver medal – second place	2012	Production
IPSC Norwegian Handgun Championship
Gold medal – first place	2012	Classic
Gold medal – first place	2016	Classic
IPSC Nordic Rifle Championship
Silver medal – second place	2001	Open
Silver medal – second place	2005	Open
IPSC Norwegian Rifle Championship
Gold medal – first place	1997	Open
Gold medal – first place	1998	Open
Gold medal – first place	2006	Open
IPSC Norwegian Tournament Championship
Gold medal – first place	2014	Open

Odd Strengenes is a Norwegian sport shooter who has won the IPSC Norwegian Handgun Championship twice (2012, 2016), the IPSC Norwegian Rifle Championship three times (1997, 1998, 2006) and the IPSC Norwegian Tournament Championship once (2014).
