= Norwegian Biathlon Association =

Norwegian sports governing body for biathlon

- Norges Skiskytterforbund
- Formation: 10 December 1983
- Type: sports governing body
- Headquarters: Oslo
- Location: Norway
- Official language: Norwegian
- Website: skiskyting.no

The Norwegian Biathlon Association (Norwegian: Norges Skiskytterforbund) (NSSF) was founded 10 December 1983 and is a Norwegian association for biathlon, and is a member of the Norwegian Olympic and Paralympic Committee and Confederation of Sports and the International Biathlon Union.

== See also ==
- Norwegian Biathlon Championships

=== Other shooting sport organizations in Norway ===
- Det frivillige Skyttervesen
- Norwegian Shooting Association
- Dynamic Sports Shooting Norway
- Norwegian Association of Hunters and Anglers
- Norwegian Benchrest Shooting Association
- Norwegian Black Powder Union
- Norwegian Metal Silhouette Association
- Scandinavian Western Shooters
