= Dynamic Sports Shooting Norway =

Norwegian organization for shooting sports

- Sport: Shooting sport
- Abbreviation: DSSN
- Founded: 1 September 1979
- Affiliation: International Practical Shooting Confederation
- Headquarters: Oslo
- President: Einar Bakke

Official website
- dssn.no

Dynamic Sports Shooting Norway (DSSN), Norwegian Dynamisk Sportsskyting Norge (DSSN), is the Norwegian association for practical shooting under the International Practical Shooting Confederation. It was constituted in 1979 as Norges Forbund for Praktisk Skyting (NFPS), and changed its name to Dynamisk Sportsskyting Norge in 2013.

== History ==
The forerunner of DSSN was the Stridsskytterligaen organized between 1974 and 1979. The International Practical Shooting Confederation (IPSC) was founded in May 1976 at the Columbia Conference in Missouri, USA, and the Norwegian Association for Practical Shooting (Norges Forbund for Praktisk Skyting, NFPS) was formally established in 1979 as IPSC Norway. Stridsskytterligaen went to become a club affiliated to NFPS. The association was named NFPS until 4 Match 2013 when the assembly ble hetende NFPS helt frem til den 4. mars 2013 da general assembly adopted the name Dynamisk Sportsskyting Norge.

In 1992, DSSN established the Norwegian part of the International Range Officers Association was established as the National Range Officers Institute of Norway (NROI Norway).

== Disciplines ==
DSSN oversees competitions in the following disciplines:

=== Practical shooting ===
IPSC is the most popular discipline within DSSN. The annual Norwegian IPSC-championships are:

- IPSC Norwegian Handgun Championship
- IPSC Norwegian Rifle Championship
- IPSC Norwegian Tournament Championship
- IPSC Norwegian Mini-Rifle Championship

=== Sivilpistol ===
Sivilpistol (lit. Civilian Pistol) is a national shooting discipline where the rules are very similar to those used within IPSC, except for different scoring methods and equipment rules. Sivilpistol competitions have been held since at least the 1980s, and the Norwegian championship is held annually.

==== Scoring ====
Competitors are to engage the targets in the shortest time possible. The scoring method is called "tid pluss" (lit. time plus), which differs from the Comstock scoring method used within IPSC. With time plus scoring, time is added for misses, poor hits, no-shoots and procedural errors. Together with the stage time, these time penalties are added and accumulates throughout the match. The scoring system has some similarities with what is known as "points down" scoring.

The winner is the one with lowest total time value after having completed all stages.

Sivilpistol plus time scoring
Hit/miss	Time added
Alpha	0 seconds
Charlie	0.5 seconds
Delta	1.5 seconds
Miss	5 seconds
No-shoot	5 seconds (maximum 5 seconds added per no-shoot target)
Procedural	3 seconds

==== Targets ====
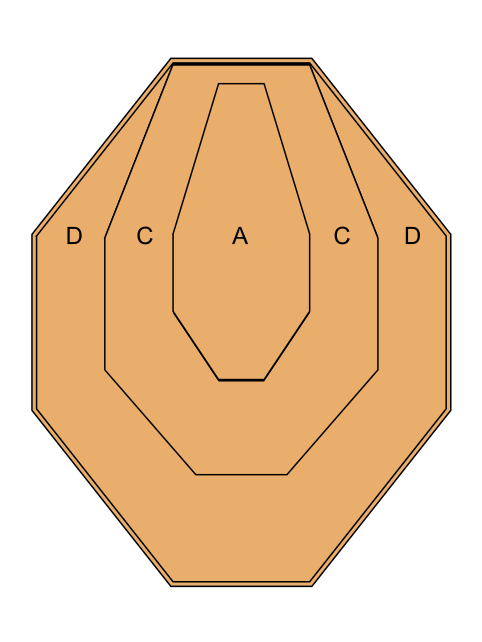
The IPSC Target is used in sivilpisol.

Only IPSC paper targets are used. Each stage can have a maximum of 5 targets.

==== Equipment rules ====
There are 5 equipment classes numbered from 1 to 5. Unlike IPSC, the ammunition does not have to satisfy any power factor requirements. Since the 2012 season, there are two different measurement boxes for checking equipment compliance. Class 1 uses a box with dimensions 185 × 120 × 30 mm, while Class 2 and 3 uses a box with dimensions 185 × 135 × 34 mm.

Class 1

Class 1 is for the smallest pistols and revolvers. The caliber must have a diameter less than 8 mm. With any of its empty magazines inserted, the firearm must fit inside the smallest measuring box that is 185 × 120 × 30 mm (until 2012, the measuring box was 125 × 91 × 26 mm). The minimum trigger pull weight is 800 grams. Ports or compensators are not allowed. Class 1 differs from the other equipment classes on a couple of points:

- The competitor starts the course of fire with the firearm in the 45° position. The holster is only used for transport.
- Changing magazines is permitted, but can not be required by the stage brief. Magazines can be loaded with a maximum of 6 rounds (+1 in chamber on loaded starts).
- Only one scoring hit per target (as opposed to two for the other classes).

Class 2

Class 2 is for pistols only, which must fit inside a box measuring 185 × 135 × 34 mm with any of its empty magazines inserted. The bullet diameter must measure between 8 and 9.9 mm, like for example 9×19 mm. Ports or compensators are not allowed. The minimum trigger pull weight is 800 grams. The holster position must satisfy the same requirements as for the IPSC Standard division.

Class 3

Class 3 is for pistols only, which must fit inside a box measuring 185 × 135 × 34 mm with any of its empty magazines inserted. The bullet diameter must measure 10 mm or larger, like for example 40 S&W. Ports or compensators are not allowed. The minimum trigger pull weight is 800 grams. The holster position must satisfy the same requirements as for the IPSC Standard division.

Class 4

Class 4 is for revolvers only, and require a bullet diameter of 7.5 mm (e.g. .32 ACP) or larger. No measurement box is used, instead there is a requirement that the barrel length is no longer than 80 mm (approx. 3.14 inches). The cylinder can be loaded with 6 maximum rounds. Ports or compensators are not allowed. There is no lower trigger pull weight limit, but only "double action" revolvers are allowed. The holster position must satisfy the same requirements as for the IPSC Standard division.

Class 5

Class 5, sometimes called "Rimfire Open", is a class for most pistols and revolvers using the .22 LR cartridge. There is no measurement box. The holster position must satisfy the same requirements as for the IPSC Open division. Class 5 is the only equipment class that permits optical sights, as well as porting or compensators. Iron sights are also allowed. Each magazine may be loaded with a maximum of ten rounds (+1 in the chamber for loaded starts). The minimum trigger pull weight is 800 grams.

=== Nordic Steel Challenge ===
Nordic Steel Challenge are held according to a common Nordic ruleset (Norway, Denmark, Sweden, and Finland). It is very similar to the American version, except for metric target sizes and distances, (mostly) IPSC equipment divisions and that IPSC safety rules are used. The Norwegian championship in Steel Challenge is held annually. There are some differences between the Nordic ruleset and the one used in the European Steel Challenge Championship.

== See also ==
- IPSC Norwegian Handgun Championship
- IPSC Norwegian Rifle Championship
- IPSC Norwegian Tournament Championship

=== Other shooting sport organizations in Norway ===
- Det frivillige Skyttervesen
- Norwegian Shooting Association
- Norwegian Association of Hunters and Anglers
- Norwegian Benchrest Shooting Association
- Norwegian Black Powder Union
- Norwegian Biathlon Association
- Norwegian Metal Silhouette Association
- Scandinavian Western Shooters
