= Hanafjellet =

Mountain in Norway

Coordinates: 64°08′N 10°18′E

Hanafjellet is the commonly used name for the small mountain located in the city of Sandnes in the western part of the large Sandnes Municipality in Rogaland county, Norway. "Hanafjellet" or "Hana Hills" lies in the northern part of the borough of Hana, separating Hana from the small village of Aspervika. The Vatneleiren military base, now mainly used by the Norwegian Home Guard, lies just east of the mountain.
