= Salén =

Salén is a surname. Notable people with the surname include:

- Dagmar Salén (1901–1980), Swedish sailor

- Sven Salén (1890–1969), Swedish sailor and businessman, husband of Dagmar Salén

- Gösta Salén (1922–2002), Swedish sailor
- Jesper Salén (born 1978), Swedish physician and actor
- Signe Salén (1871–1963), Swedish physician
