= Kenneth Salen =

Norwegian sport shooter

Medal record
IPSC
Representing Norway
IPSC Norwegian Rifle Championship
Gold medal – first place	2014 Furumoen	Open
Gold medal – first place	2015 Reviholen	Open
Gold medal – first place	2016 Setermoen	Open
IPSC Norwegian Tournament Championship
Silver medal – second place	2014 Kyrksæterøra	Open
Bronze medal – third place	2015 Reviholen	Open
Bronze medal – third place	2016 Setermoen	Open

Kenneth Salen is a Norwegian sport shooter, who is a three-time IPSC Norwegian Rifle Championship Champion (2014, 2015, 2016) and three time IPSC Norwegian Tournament Championship Champion (2014, 2015, 2016).
