= Sverre Idland =

Norwegian sport shooter

Medal record
IPSC
Representing Norway
IPSC European Rifle Championship
Bronze medal – third place	2015 Bükk	Standard, Senior
IPSC Nordic Rifle Championship
Gold medal – first place	2004	Standard
Gold medal – first place	2005	Standard
Gold medal – first place	2007	Standard
Gold medal – first place	2008	Standard
Silver medal – second place	2013	Senior Standard
Gold medal – first place	2014	Senior Standard
Silver medal – second place	2015	Senior Standard
IPSC Norwegian Rifle Championship
Gold medal – first place	1989
Gold medal – first place	1990
Gold medal – first place	1991
Gold medal – first place	1992
Gold medal – first place	1993
Gold medal – first place	1995
Gold medal – first place	1996
Gold medal – first place	2004	Standard
Gold medal – first place	2005	Standard
Gold medal – first place	2006	Standard
Gold medal – first place	2007	Standard
Gold medal – first place	2008	Standard
Gold medal – first place	2009	Standard
Gold medal – first place	2010	Standard
Gold medal – first place	2012	Standard
Gold medal – first place	2013	Standard
Silver medal – second place	2015	Standard
Silver medal – second place	2016	Standard
Bronze medal – third place	2017	Standard
Silver medal – second place	2018	Senior Standard

Sverre Idland is a Norwegian sport shooter who has won the IPSC Nordic Rifle Championship overall Standard title 4 times, and the IPSC Norwegian Rifle Championship title 16 times, and is thereby the Norwegian with the most medals and wins from the Norwegian championships in practical shooting.
