= Norwegian Black Powder Union =

Competition shooting association

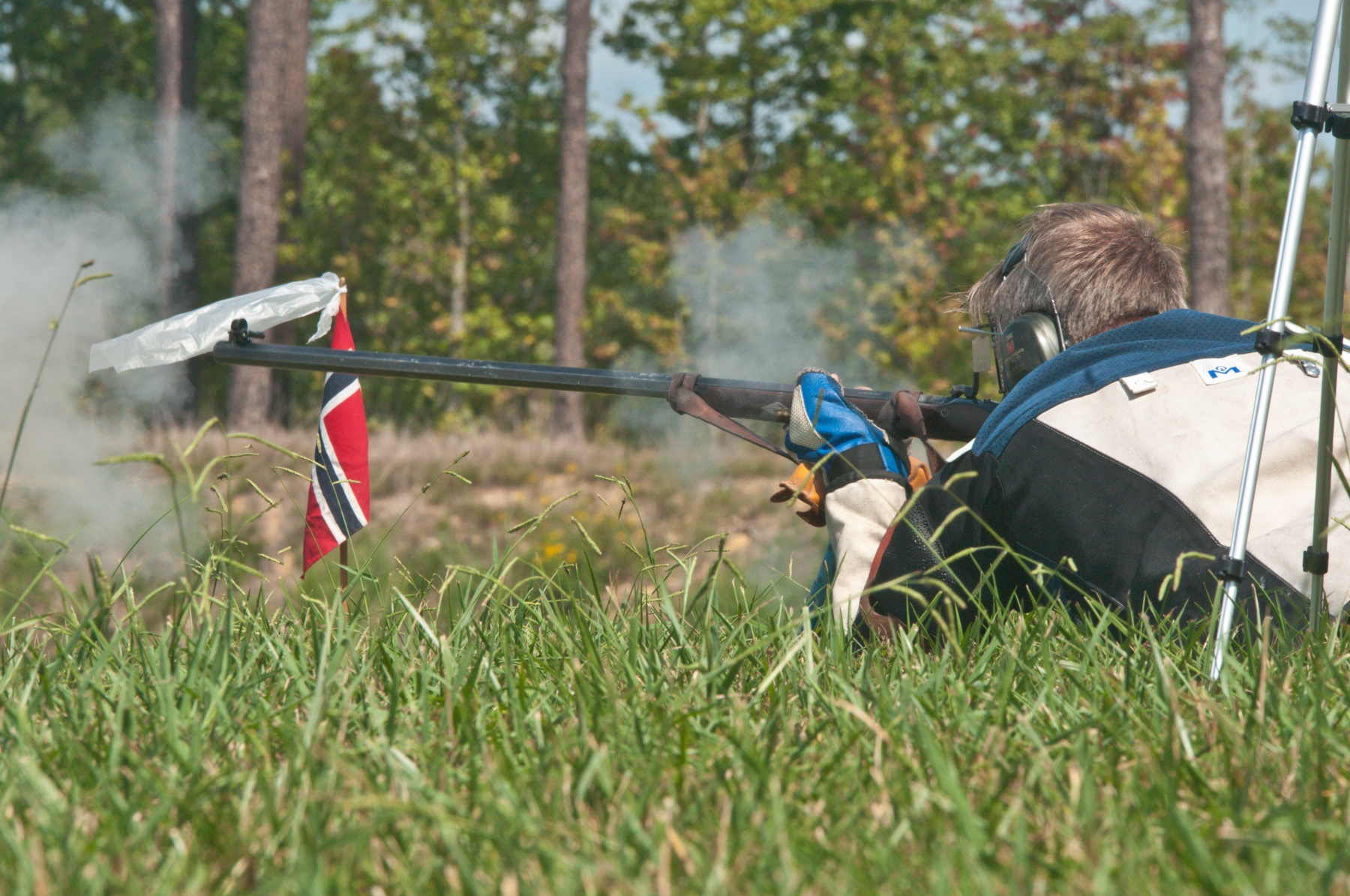
A Norwegian competitor firing his muzzleloader at 1000 yards (914.4 meters) during the 2015 MLAIC World Muzzle Loading Long Range Championships.

The Norwegian Black Powder Union, Norwegian Norsk Svartkruttunion (NSU), is the Norwegian association for muzzleloading competition shooting under the Muzzle Loaders Associations International Committee (MLAIC) and Muzzle Loading Association Scandinavian Committee (MLASC).

NSU was founded 2 December 1983 by Ragnar Hegge, and aims to preserve Norwegian history of fireams as well as to exercise shooting according to the old methods.

Competition rules are given by MLAIC, but NSU also offer own separate national equipment divisions for historical Norwegian military and civilian muzzleloaders from the end of the 19th century. In these competitions many choose to dress in themed clothing appropriate for the time period of their firearm. Some of the oldest firearms which have been used in competitions arranged by NSU is a matchlock mechanism from the 15th century. Firearms using cartridges may also be used, but they must be loaded with black powder.

NSU has a members magazine called Muskedunderen ("The Blunderbuss") which is published four times a year. In addition to organizational information such as match invitations, the magazine also contains articles about firearms history written by both members and non-members, and as such functions as an important tool for the conservation of antique firearms history.

== See also ==
- List of shooting sports organizations

=== Other shooting sport organizations in Norway ===
- Det frivillige Skyttervesen
- Norwegian Shooting Association
- Dynamic Sports Shooting Norway
- Norwegian Association of Hunters and Anglers
- Norwegian Benchrest Shooting Association
- Norwegian Biathlon Association
- Norwegian Metal Silhouette Association
