= Henning Wallgren =

Norwegian sport shooter

Personal information
- Born: 15 August 1968 (age 57)
Medal record
IPSC
Representing Norway
IPSC Nordic Handgun Championship
Gold medal – first place	1996 Hillerød	Open
Gold medal – first place	2003 Oulu	Open
IPSC Norwegian Handgun Championship
Silver medal – second place	1995 Risør	Open
Gold medal – first place	1996 Sessvollmoen	Open
Gold medal – first place	2004 Eplerød	Standard
Bronze medal – third place	2009 Hamar	Open
Gold medal – first place	2010 Kongsvinger	Standard

Henning Wallgren (born 15 August 1968) is a competitive shooter from Norway sponsored by Tanfoglio and after market designer and manufacturer of Tanfoglio Italy pistol parts (distributed in the US by EAA), 1911 - STI and the AR-15 in Longmont Colorado, United States and co-founder of American Zoot Shooters Association.

== Merits ==
- 4 time IPSC Nordic Handgun Championship winner
- 2 time USPSA Golden Gate champion
- 2 time Canadian IPSC Championship winner
- 3 time Norwegian IPSC Champion (Open & Standard) winner
- 3 time Rocky Mountain 300 winner
- Czech Euro Open IPSC Standard winner
- USPSA Area 2 2007, 4 Champion
- Winner of Canadian, Hungarian, Slovenian, Swedish, Finnish, Danish, Czech and Swiss IPSC championships
- USPSA State Champion in Arizona, California, Ohio, New Mexico, Colorado, Florida, Nebraska, Texas, Oklahoma, Missouri and Arkansas
- Awarded the King's Trophy of Harald V of Norway for winning the 2004 IPSC Norwegian Handgun Championship, Standard division.
- Placed 2nd at the IPSC European Handgun Championship.
- Placed 2nd at the USPSA Handgun Championship, Open division.
- Placed 5th at the USPSA Multigun Championship
- Placed 6th at the USPSA Handgun Championship, Limited division.
