= Borris Skydeterræn =

Coordinates: 55.94761°N 8.66303°E

Borris Skydeterræn (lit. Borris Shooting Ranges), also known as Borrislejren (Camp Borris) or Borris Garnison, is a shooting range and proving ground owned by the Danish state, and is regularly used for exercises by the Danish defence forces. Since the area is used by the whole Danish defence forces there are no regularly stationed forces here. The area has housing and accommodation facilities, offices and canteens.

Borris Skydeterræn lies approximately 12 km east of Skjern in Vestjylland. It is the largest heath in Denmark with an area of 4 700 hectare (47 km^{2}). The terrain also has a lot of animal life such as deer and birds. The area has been protected since the government bought the area in 1903, i.e. for over 100 years. When the area was purchased by the government, all houses and farms were removed. This produced an area bearing the appearance of clay fences and marked plains

Borris Skydeterræn is built in a special way compared to most other proving ground. Instead of shooting out towards the waters, the shooting is performed towards the center of the area. The range has a circularly shaped road going around the firing area, which it is normally prohibited to shoot towards.

In addition to military exercises, the range has been for sport shooting competitions.
