= Vidar Nakling =

Norwegian competitive shooter (born 1950)

Personal information
- Born: 1950 (age 75–76)
Medal record
IPSC
Representing Norway
IPSC European Handgun Championship
Gold medal – first place	1980 Oslo
IPSC Norwegian Handgun Championship
Gold medal – first place	1983 Vatneleiren
Gold medal – first place	1984 Løvenskiold
Gold medal – first place	1987 Løvenskiold
Gold medal – first place	1990 Lillestrøm

Vidar Nakling (born 1950) is a Norwegian competitive shooter who won the 1980 IPSC European Handgun Championship, and four time Norwegian IPSC Handgun Champion (1983, 1984, 1987 and 1990). He is the father and coach of IPSC World Champion Hilde Nakling and has written a book on how to succeed in dynamic pistol shooting.
