= Steinar Haugli =

Norwegian sport shooter (born 1967)

Medal record
IPSC
Representing Norway
IPSC Norwegian Handgun Championship
Silver medal – second place	1997	Standard
Silver medal – second place	1998 Nesbyen	Standard
Silver medal – second place	1999	Standard
Bronze medal – third place	2000 Hell	Standard
Bronze medal – third place	2001	Standard
Gold medal – first place	2003 Haltdalen	Standard
Silver medal – second place	2004 Eplerød	Production
Gold medal – first place	2005 Moss	Open
Silver medal – second place	2005 Kongsvinger	Standard
Silver medal – second place	2006 Løvenskiold	Standard
Bronze medal – third place	2006 Kongsvinger	Standard
Silver medal – second place	2006	Production
Gold medal – first place	2006 Bjørkelangen	Revolver
Gold medal – first place	2007 Løvenskiold	Open
Silver medal – second place	2007 Kongsvinger	Production
Gold medal – first place	2009 Hamar	Open
Silver medal – second place	2009 Løvenskiold	Standard
Gold medal – first place	2009 Kongsvinger	Production
Bronze medal – third place	2010 Eplerød	Open
Gold medal – first place	2010 Løvenskiold	Production
Gold medal – first place	2011 Løvenskiold	Open
Gold medal – first place	2011 Kongsvinger	Production
Silver medal – second place	2012 Løvenskiold	Standard
Bronze medal – third place	2012 Kongsvinger	Production
Bronze medal – third place	2013 Aurskog	Open
Gold medal – first place	2013 Moss	Standard
Gold medal – first place	2014 Kongsvinger	Standard
Gold medal – first place	2014 Haugesund	Classic
Bronze medal – third place	2015 Aurskog	Open
Gold medal – first place	2015 Haugesund	Classic
Gold medal – first place	2016 Løvenskiold	Open
Silver medal – second place	2018 Haugesund	Standard

Steinar Haugli (born 1967) is a Norwegian sport shooter who has won the IPSC Norwegian Handgun Championship 9 times, the Dynamic Sports Shooting Norway civilian pistol championship 3 times, and the NSF Field Shooting Championship Revolver class in 2002. He has been competing actively since 1988.
