= Terningmoen =

Coordinates: 60°52′N 11°31′E

Terningmoen is a military camp (or base) in Elverum Municipality, Norway.

The base trains and houses parts of the Norwegian Army such as:

- His Majesty the King's Guard (HMKG) (First two months of service)
- Norwegian Home Guard HV-05 (district 5 of the Home Guard)
- Norwegian Military Academy (The first year)
- Some TRADOK-units (Norwegian army transformation - and doctrine commando)
- Forsvarets Logistikkorganisasjon (FLO) (Logistics and support)

The base is also the location of a guard company "Vakt og Sikring Kompani Østerdalen", which has the responsibility of the protection of the camp.

The base trains soldiers (both Norwegian and NATO allies) in the Norwegian Army's Winter School, which trains soldiers in the harsh environments of winter in colder countries.

The base has shooting ranges, and large training areas which are used by many army units.
