= Even Skaarer =

Norwegian sport shooter

Medal record
IPSC
Representing Norway
IPSC Norwegian Handgun Championship
Gold medal – first place	2005	Production
Gold medal – first place	2006	Production
Gold medal – first place	2006	Standard
Gold medal – first place	2007	Production
Gold medal – first place	2007	Standard
Gold medal – first place	2008	Production
Gold medal – first place	2008	Standard
Gold medal – first place	2012	Production
Gold medal – first place	2012	Standard
IPSC Norwegian Rifle Championship
Gold medal – first place	2001	Open
Gold medal – first place	2002	Open
Gold medal – first place	2004	Open
Gold medal – first place	2005	Open

Even Skaarer is a Norwegian sport shooter who has won the IPSC Norwegian Handgun Championship nine times and the IPSC Norwegian Rifle Championship four times.
