= Norwegian Shooting Association =

Norwegian organization for shooting sports

The Norwegian Shooting Association
- Norges Skytterforbund
- Formation: 5 July 1946
- President: Jan Tore Berg-Knutsen
- Parent organization: ISSF, FITASC, WA1500, ESC, NSR
- Website: skyting.no

Norges Skytterforbund (NSF), literally Norway’s Shooter Association, is a Norwegian umbrella organization for shooting sports, and is internationally affiliated with the International Shooting Sport Federation (ISSF), Fédération Internationale de Tir aux Armes Sportives de Chasse (FITASC) and Precision Pistol Competition (WA1500). NSF was founded in 1946, and is also organized under the Norwegian Olympic and Paralympic Committee and Confederation of Sports.

== See also ==
- Nordic Shooting Region
- List of shooting sports organizations

=== Other shooting sport organizations in Norway ===
- Det frivillige Skyttervesen
- Dynamic Sports Shooting Norway
- Norwegian Association of Hunters and Anglers
- Norwegian Benchrest Shooting Association
- Norwegian Black Powder Union
- Norwegian Biathlon Association
- Norwegian Metal Silhouette Association
- Scandinavian Western Shooters

=== Other umbrella organizations for shooting ===
- Association of Maltese Arms Collectors and Shooters
- French Shooting Federation
- Finnish Shooting Sport Federation
- Hellenic Shooting Federation
- Monaco Shooting Federation
- Royal Spanish Olympic Shooting Federation
- Swiss Shooting Sport Federation
