= Dansk Skytte Union =

Danish Shooting Union for sport shooting

Dansk Skytte Union (DSkyU; literally the Danish Shooting Union) is a Danish association for sport shooting with rifle, pistol and shotgun. The association consists of over 50,000 members and 450 associated clubs.
