= Rune Vikeby =

Norwegian sport shooter

Personal information
- Born: 24 August 1964 (age 61)
Medal record
IPSC
Representing Norway
IPSC Norwegian Handgun Championship
Gold medal – first place	2008 Kongsvinger	Revolver
Gold medal – first place	2009 Løvenskiold	Standard
Bronze medal – third place	2009 Kongsvinger	Production
Gold medal – first place	2010 Eplerød	Revolver
Gold medal – first place	2011 Løvenskiold	Revolver
Silver medal – second place	2013 Løvenskiold	Revolver
Gold medal – first place	2014 Løvenskiold	Revolver
Silver medal – second place	2015 Bergen	Revolver
Bronze medal – third place	2016 Haugesund	Revolver

Rune Vikeby (born 24 August 1964) is a Norwegian sport shooter who has won the IPSC Norwegian Handgun Championship in practical shooting with revolver 5 times and civilian pistol 8 times. At the 2022 IPSC Handgun World Shoot he took gold i the Super Senior category in Production Optics Lite.
