= Heistadmoen =

Military encampment in Kongsberg, Norway

Coordinates: 59.5969°N 9.66444°E

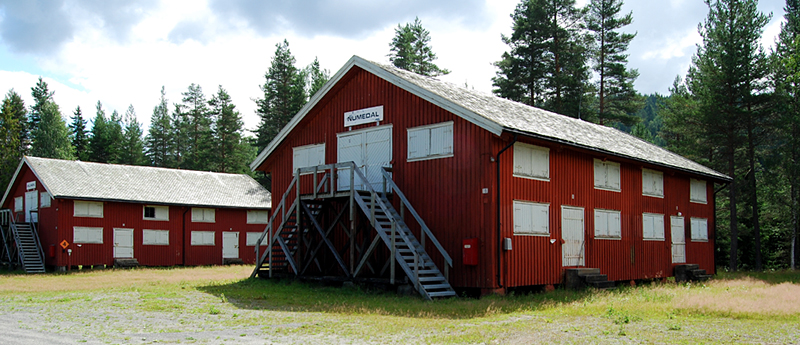
Supply Depot at Heistadmoen

Heistadmoen is a Norwegian military encampment in Kongsberg Municipality in Buskerud county, Norway. Heistadmoen currently provides able quarters for the Telemark and Buskerud Home Guard District (Telemark og Buskerud Heimevernsdistrikt). The camp is large and modern, most of the buildings have been recently refurbished. The camp is also used by other departments for training and shooting. It is located about 7 kilometres (4.3 mi) south of the town of Kongsberg.

== History ==
There were scattered activity on site dating from 1909 when the Telemark Infantry Regiment was based there. The earliest buildings were relocated from the Gråtenmoen area in Skien. The principal function was to provide better protection for the Kongsberg Weapons Factory.

During World War II, Telemark Infantry Regiment capitulated to the invading German Army without a fight on 13 April 1940 due to the threat of German bombing. A number of officers and crew took arms and continued the defense in Telemark. During the occupation of Norway by Nazi Germany, the German Military built up most of the camp with labor provided by Soviet prisoners of war. After the war ended in 1945, the camp housed German prisoners of war, guarded by U.S. and British soldiers.

From 1946 to 1952 continued training of infantry battalions of the Tysklandsbrigaden, the Norwegian army's contribution to the Allied occupation force in Germany. In 1994, the new Battalion Telemark created Heistadmoen. The Battalion was moved to Camp Rena during August 2001. It was next occupied by His Majesty the King's Guard 6 Company, which later was also moved to Camp Rena.

Telemark Regiment was laid down on 1 January 2003, and Heistadmoen camp was transferred to the Telemark and Buskerud Home Guard District. The facilities are presently available for the use of all districts surrounding the Oslo Fjord. The Telemark Battalion, Krigsskolen Military Academy, National Guard and local police are the principal users. About half the camp is scheduled to be sold, when National Guard does not need buildings.
