= Sessvollmoen =

- Village
- Location in Akershus
- Coordinates: 60.235°N 11.1469°E
- Country: Norway
- Region: Østlandet
- County: Akershus
- Municipality: Ullensaker
- Time zone: UTC+01:00 (CET)
  - Summer (DST): UTC+02:00 (CEST)

Sessvollmoen is a village in the municipality of Ullensaker, Norway. Its population (2023) is 1302.
