= Løvenskiold shooting range =

Shooting range in Norway

Coordinates: 59.962°N 10.580°E

Løvenskiold shooting range, (Norwegian: Løvenskioldbanen), was built in 1951 and is Norway's largest civilian shooting range. The range is used daily by sports shooters and hunters from many different clubs, and is also used by Oslo Police District and His Majesty The King's Guard as their primary training facility for both rifle and pistol.

== See also ==
- Jonsvatnet shooting range, the largest civilian shooting range in the city of Trondheim, Norway
