= Vatneleiren =

Military base in Sandnes, Norway

- Hana, Sandnes Municipality, Rogaland county Near Stavanger in Norway

Site information
- Owner: Ministry of Defence
- Operator: Home Guard
- Condition: In use

Location
- Coordinates: 58°51′00″N 05°46′48″E

Site history
- Built by: German Army

Garrison information
- Garrison: Agder og Rogaland Heimevernsdistrikt 08

Vatneleiren is a military base located in Sandnes Municipality in Rogaland county, Norway. It was constructed just east of the Hanafjellet mountain just outside the city of Sandnes by the German Army during the German occupation of Norway in World War II, and has been used by the Norwegian Army since 1945. After the Cold War ended the number of soldiers stationed there gradually decreased, and the base is now mainly used by the Norwegian Home Guard. The Agder og Rogaland Heimevernsdistrikt 08 (Agder and Rogaland Home District 08) is based here, covering the two southernmost counties of Rogaland and Agder. The United Nations Logistics Officers Centre maintains a training centre in Vatneleiren, offering a logistics course.
