= National Rifle Association (disambiguation) =

Most commonly refers to the National Rifle Association of America.

National Rifle Association may also refer to:

- Dominion of Canada Rifle Association
- Guyana National Rifle Association
- Jamaica Rifle Association
- National Rifle Association of Australia
- National Rifle Association of India
- National Rifle Association of Japan
- National Rifle Association of New Zealand
- National Rifle Association of Norway
- National Rifle Association of Pakistan
- National Rifle Association (United Kingdom)
- Trinidad Rifle Association

== See also ==
- NRA (disambiguation)
- List of shooting sports organizations, including several national associations
