= NRAS =

NRAS may refer to:

- National Rental Affordability Scheme in Australia
- Neuroblastoma RAS viral oncogene homolog encoded by the NRAS gene

== See also ==
- NRA (disambiguation)
