= NRA =

NRA may refer to:

== Organizations ==
=== Asia and Oceania ===
- National Railway Administration, the national railway regulator of China
- National Recruitment Agency, Central Recruiting Agency of the Indian Government
- New Revolutionary Alternative, an anarchist organization in Russia
- National Revolutionary Army, the National Army of the Republic of China from 1925
- Nuclear Regulation Authority, in Japan
- Nature Reserves Authority, a predecessor of Israel Nature and Parks Authority
- National Rifle Association of Australia
- National Rifle Association of New Zealand

=== Africa ===
- National Reconstruction Alliance, a political party in Tanzania
- National Resistance Army, in Uganda
- South African National Roads Agency

=== Europe ===
==== United Kingdom ====
- National Rifle Association (United Kingdom)
- National Register of Archives
- National Rivers Authority, a forerunner of the Environment Agency of England and Wales
- National Rounders Association, in the List of international sports federations

==== Other organizations in europe ====
- National Republican Army (Russia), an underground Russian partisan group
- National Roads Authority of Ireland
- Neutelings Riedijk Architects, in the Netherlands

=== United States ===
- National Recovery Administration, a former agency established in 1933
- National Reform Association (1844), a land reform organization
- National Reform Association (1864), an organization seeking to amend the U.S. Constitution to include a Christian amendment
- National Restaurant Association, a restaurant industry business association
- National Rifle Association, a gun rights advocacy group

== Science and technology ==
- Norepinephrine releasing agent, a type of drug
- Nuclear reaction analysis, a nuclear method of nuclear spectroscopy in materials science

== Other uses ==
- National recreation area, a designation for a protected area in the US
- Nonresident alien, in US immigration law
- New Red Arrow, brand name applied to the Japanese Seibu 10000 series train
- New Rubinelle Army, a faction in the video game Advance Wars: Days of Ruin
- Narrandera Airport, IATA airport code "NRA"

== See also ==
- National Rifle Association (disambiguation)
