= New Zealand Shooting Federation =

Governing body for target shooting sports in New Zealand

- Sport: Shooting sports
- Jurisdiction: New Zealand
- Abbreviation: NZSF, New Zealand Shooting
- Affiliation: Sport New Zealand
- Headquarters: Papakura
- President: E. Pirie
- Vice president: R. Morgan

Official website
- nzshootingfed.org.nz
- (New Zealand)

The New Zealand Shooting Federation (NZSF) is the governing body for target shooting sports in New Zealand. It holds the responsibility for selecting and developing national teams for world championships, the Olympic and Paralympic Games, and the Commonwealth Games.

== Background ==
NZSF acts as an umbrella organisation, with clubs and participants affiliating via four associations:

- National Rifle Association of New Zealand (Fullbore rifle)
- New Zealand Clay Target Association
- Pistol New Zealand
- Target Shooting New Zealand (Smallbore and Air rifle)

On behalf of those organisations, the Federation serves as the representative to Sport New Zealand, Paralympics New Zealand, the New Zealand Olympic Committee and the International Shooting Sport Federation.

== Performance at Competition ==
Shooting has been one of New Zealand's most successful sports at the Commonwealth Games. At the 1998 Games in Kuala Lumpur, shooting was the highest performing New Zealand sport, winning eight medals, including one gold. Pistol shooter Greg Yelavich is New Zealand's most medalled Commonwealth Games athlete, having won 12 medals between 1986 and 2010.

=== 1980 Summer Paralympic Games ===
- Dave Tarrant, Bronze - Mixed Air Pistol 2-5

=== 1984 Summer Paralympic Games ===
- Alison Smith, Bronze - Women's Air Rifle Integrated

=== 1998 Commonwealth Games ===
- Desmond Coe, Bronze − Men's Trap
- Tania Corrigan, Bronze − Women's 10M Air Pistol
- Sally Johnston, Bronze − Women's 50M Prone Rifle
- Tania Corrigan and Jocelyn Lees, Silver − Women's 10M Air Pistol (Pairs); Silver - Women's 25M Sport Pistol (Pairs)
- Stephen Petterson, Gold − Men's 50M Rifle Prone
- Jason Wakeling and Alan Earle − Silver, Men's 25M Rapid Fire Pistol (Pairs)
- Greg Yelavich, Bronze − Men's 10M Air Pistol

=== 2004 Summer Paralympic Games ===
- Michael Johnson, Gold - R4 10m Air Rifle

=== 2006 Commonwealth Games ===
- Teresa Borrell and Nadine Stanton, Bronze − Women's Trap (Pairs)
- Graeme Ede, Gold − Men's Trap
- Juliet Etherington, Silver − Women's 50M Prone Rifle
- Juliet Etherington and Kathryn Mead, Bronze − Women's 50M Prone Rifle (Pairs)
- Gregory Yelavich, Silver − Men's 25M Centre Fire Pistol

=== 2008 Summer Paralympic Games ===
- Michael Johnson, Bronze - R4 10m Air Rifle

=== 2012 Summer Paralympic Games ===
- Michael Johnson, Bronze - R4 10m Air Rifle

=== 2014 Commonwealth Games ===
- Sally Johnston, Gold − Women's 50M Prone Rifle

=== 2016 Summer Olympics ===
- Natalie Rooney, Silver − Women's Trap
