= Seibu 40000 series =

Japanese electric multiple unit train type

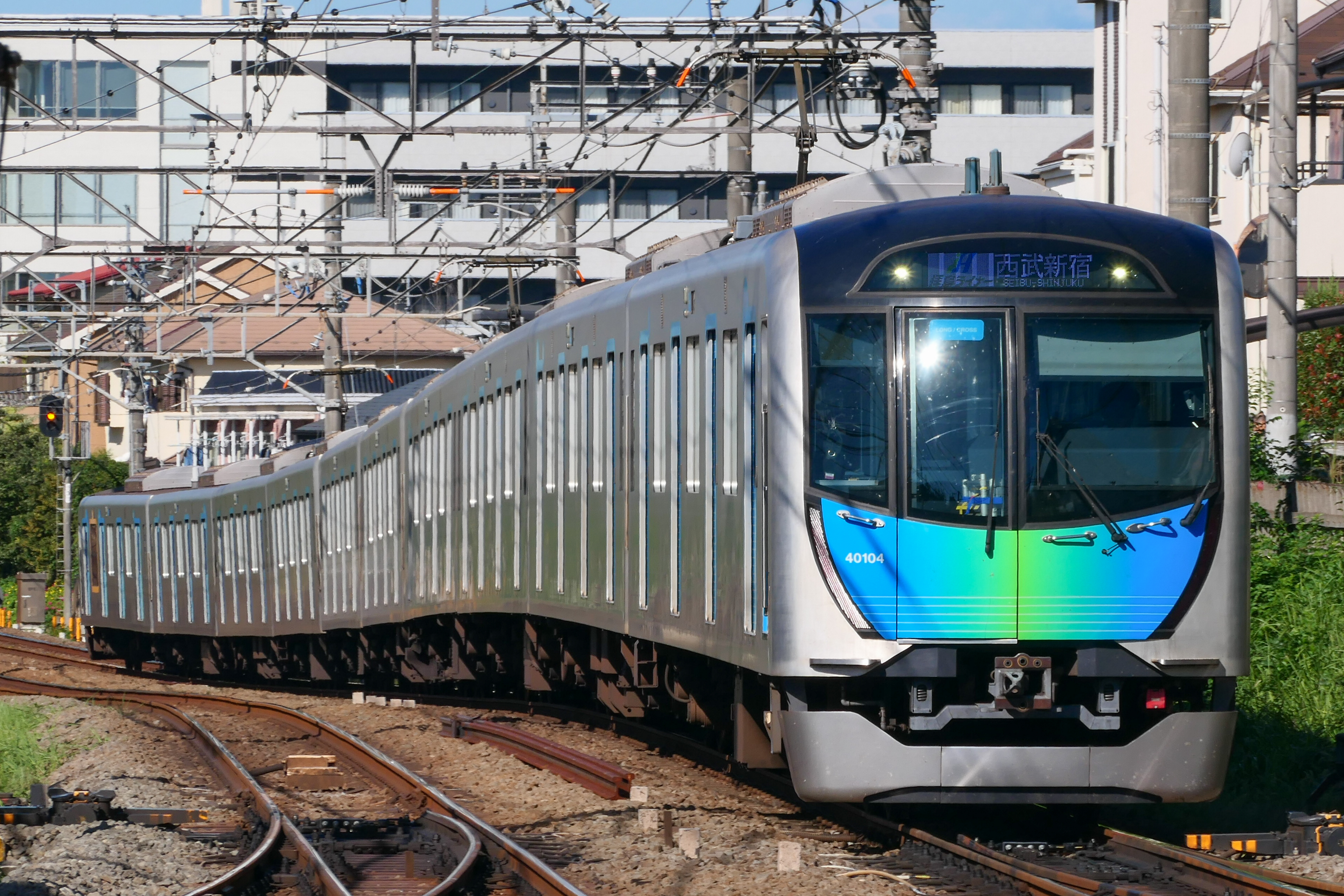
- 40000 series set 40104 in October 2023
- In service: 2017–present
- Manufacturers: Kawasaki Heavy Industries, Kawasaki Railcar Manufacturing
- Built at: Kobe, Hyōgo
- Family name: efACE
- Replaced: 2000 series
- Constructed: 2016–
- Entered service: 25 March 2017
- Number built: 224 vehicles (23 sets)
- Formation: 8/10 cars per trainset
- Fleet numbers: 40101–40106, 40151–40164 (10-car sets); 48151–48153 (8-car sets)
- Operator: Seibu Railway
- Lines served: Seibu Chichibu Line; Seibu Ikebukuro Line; Seibu Shinjuku Line; Seibu Haijima Line; Tokyo Metro Yurakucho Line; Tokyo Metro Fukutoshin Line; Tokyu Toyoko Line; Minatomirai Line

Specifications
- Car body construction: Aluminium alloy
- Car length: 20,270 mm (66 ft 6 in) (end cars); 20,000 mm (65 ft 7 in) (intermediate cars)
- Width: 2,848 mm (9 ft 4.1 in)
- Height: 4,050 mm (13 ft 3 in)
- Doors: 4 pairs per side
- Maximum speed: 120 km/h (75 mph)
- Traction system: Toshiba 2-level IGBT–VVVF
- Traction motors: 20 × 190 kW (255 hp) permanent-magnet synchronous motor
- Power output: 3.8 MW (5,096 hp)
- Acceleration: 3.3 km/(h⋅s) (2.1 mph/s)
- Deceleration: 3.5 km/(h⋅s) (2.2 mph/s) (service); 4.5 km/(h⋅s) (2.8 mph/s) (emergency)
- Electric systems: 1,500 V DC Overhead catenary
- Current collection: Pantograph
- UIC classification: 2'2' + Bo'Bo' + Bo'Bo' + 2'2' + Bo'Bo' + 2'2' + 2'2' + Bo'Bo' + Bo'Bo' + 2'2'
- Bogies: SS185
- Track gauge: 1,067 mm (3 ft 6 in)

The Seibu 40000 series (西武40000系) is a commuter electric multiple unit (EMU) train type operated by the private railway operator Seibu Railway in Japan since March 2017. As of March 2025, a total of 20 ten-car trainsets and 3 eight-car trainsets have been built by Kawasaki Heavy Industries in Kobe from 2016, with the first trains entering service on 25 March 2017.

== Design ==
The new 40000 series trains were built by Kawasaki Heavy Industries in Kobe from January 2016, with deliveries scheduled to continue from fiscal 2016 to 2019. This is the first time that trains for Seibu Railway have been built by this manufacturer.

The new trains are designed as an evolution of the 30000 series "Smile Train" concept, and are intended to be passenger-friendly.

== Operations ==
The 40000 series trains operate on Seibu Ikebukuro Line, Seibu Shinjuku Line, and Seibu Haijima Line services. Some trainsets operate on reserved-seat supplementary-fare S-Train services between the Seibu Ikebukuro Line and Tokyo Metro Yurakucho Line on weekdays and between the Seibu Chichibu Line and Minatomirai Line (via the Tokyo Metro Fukutoshin Line and Tōkyū Tōyoko Line) at weekends since 25 March 2017.

== Formation ==
The 40000 series EMUs are ten-car sets formed as follows, with five motored ("M") cars and five non-powered trailer ("T") cars, and car 1 at the Hanno (i.e. northern) end.

Car No.	1	2	3	4	5	6	7	8	9	10
Designation	Tc1	M1	M2	T1	M3	T2	T3	M5	M6	Tc2
Numbering	4010x	4020x	4030x	4040x	4050x	4060x	4070x	4080x	4090x	4000x
Weight (t)	29.5	36.9	35.0	28.2	34.6	26.7	27.2	37.0	34.8	28.6
Capacity (total/seated) longitudinal config.	124/38	132/45	132/48	126/42	132/48	132/48	132/48	132/48	132/45	125/30
Capacity (total/seated) transverse config.	119/38	127/45	127/48	121/42	127/48	127/48	127/48	127/48	127/45	121/30

Cars 2, 5, and 8 each have one single-arm pantograph. Car 4 has a universal access toilet.

=== 40050 subseries ===
Due to the use of fixed longitudinal seating throughout, the 40050 subseries EMUs are slightly lighter and accommodate more passengers than the 40000 series trains.

Car No.	1	2	3	4	5	6	7	8	9	10
Designation	Tc1	M1	M2	T1	M3	T2	T3	M5	M6	Tc2
Numbering	4015x	4025x	4035x	4045x	4055x	4065x	4075x	4085x	4095x	4005x
Weight (t)	28.2	35.9	33.5	24.8	33.0	25.4	25.5	35.8	33.4	27.9
Capacity (total/seated)	135/45	146/51	146/51	146/51	146/51	146/51	146/51	146/51	146/51	136/31

Cars 2, 5, and 8 each have one single-arm pantograph.

== Interior ==
The trains' interiors use LED lighting, and pairs of LCD passenger information screens are provided both above the doorways and suspended form the ceilings. A "Partner zone" area is provided at the end of car 10 with perch seats and space for wheelchairs and large luggage. This area also has larger windows. "Plasmacluster" air-purification technology is used for the first time on Seibu Railway trains.

=== 40000 series ===
Passenger accommodation consists primarily of rotating pairs of seats can be arranged in either longitudinal or transverse arrangements, known as "LONG/CROSS" seats.

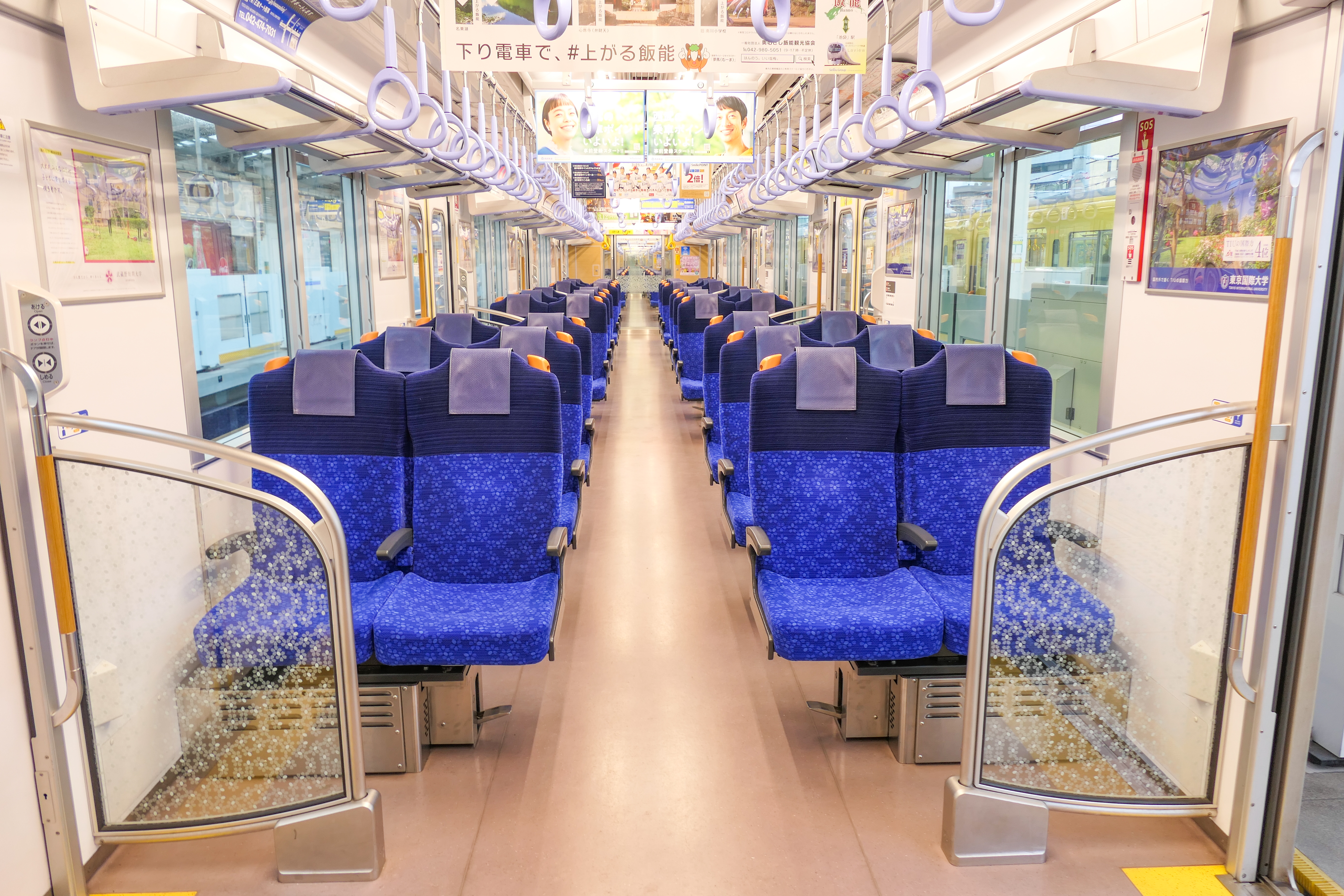
The interior of a 40000 series set in March 2022 with seating in transverse configuration

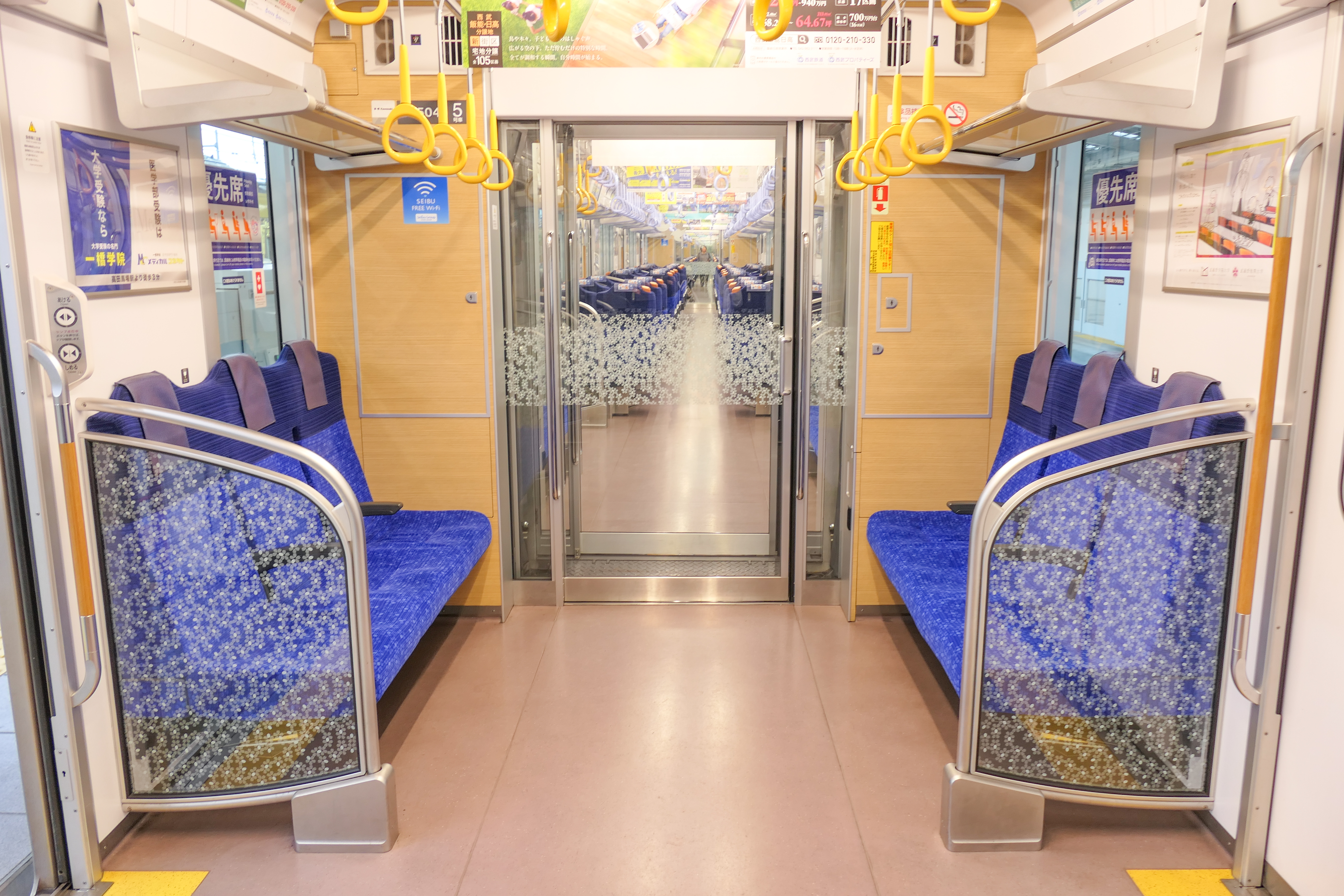
Three-person seating at the end of a car in March 2022

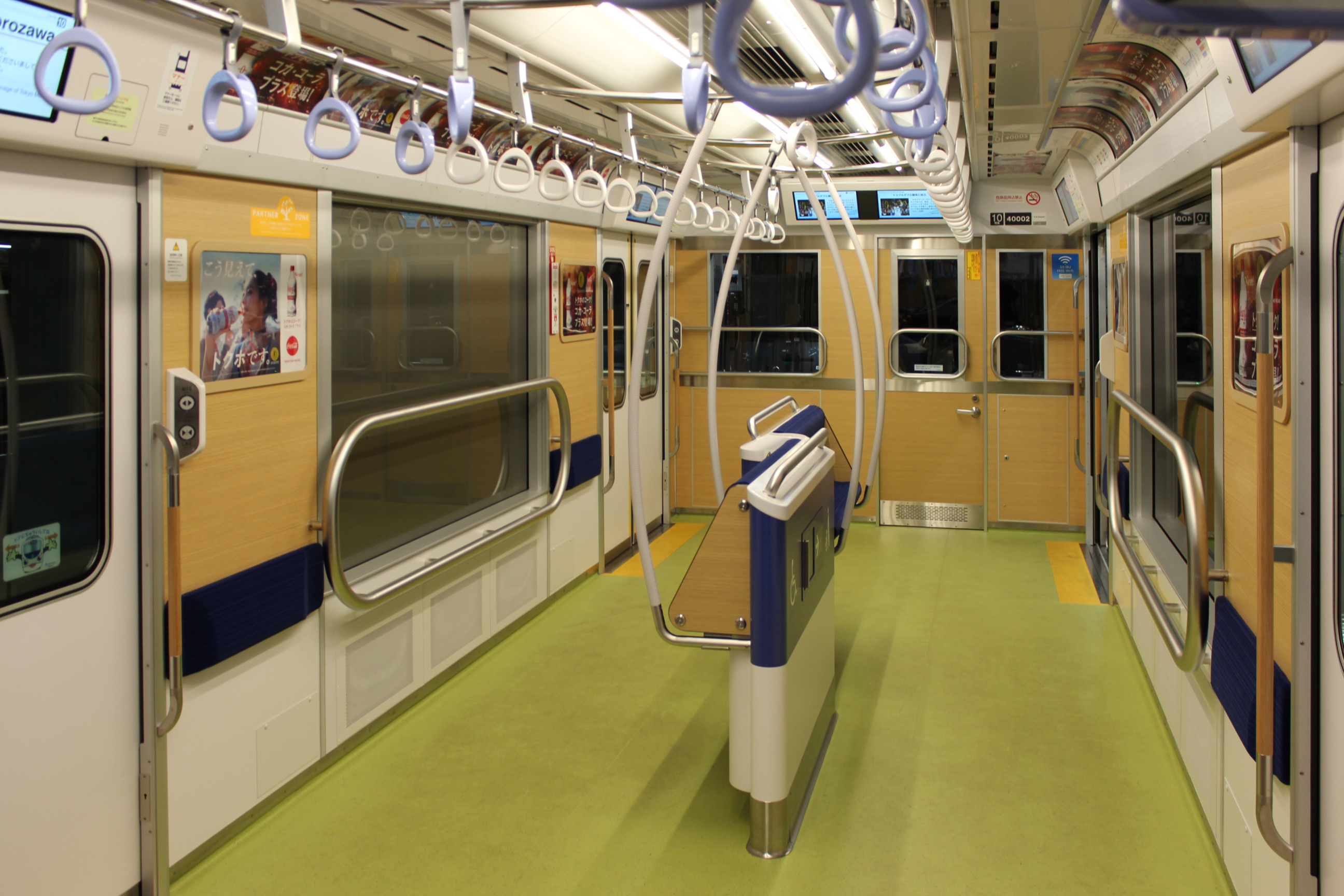
The "Partner zone" standing area in car 10 in April 2017

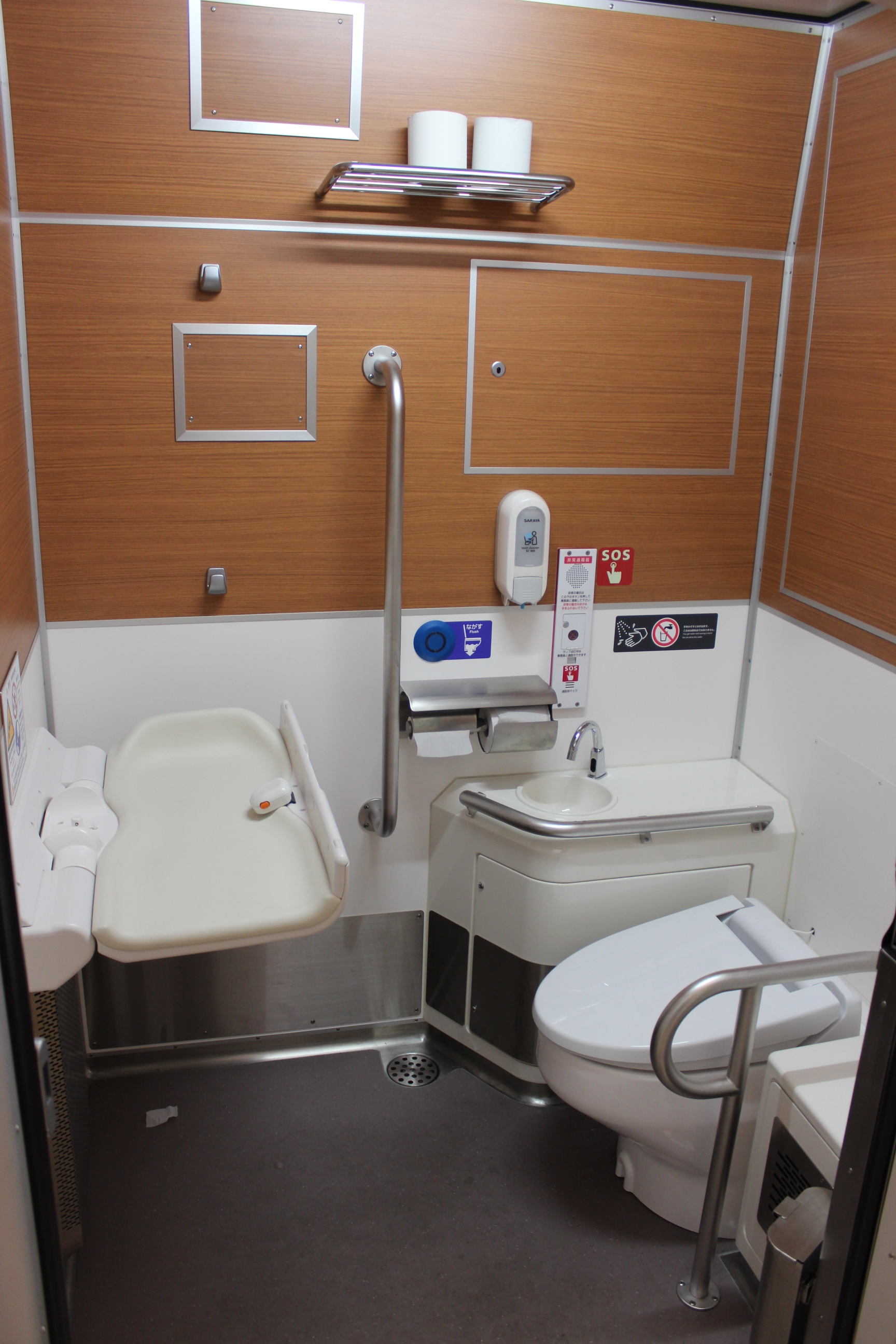
The train toilet in April 2017

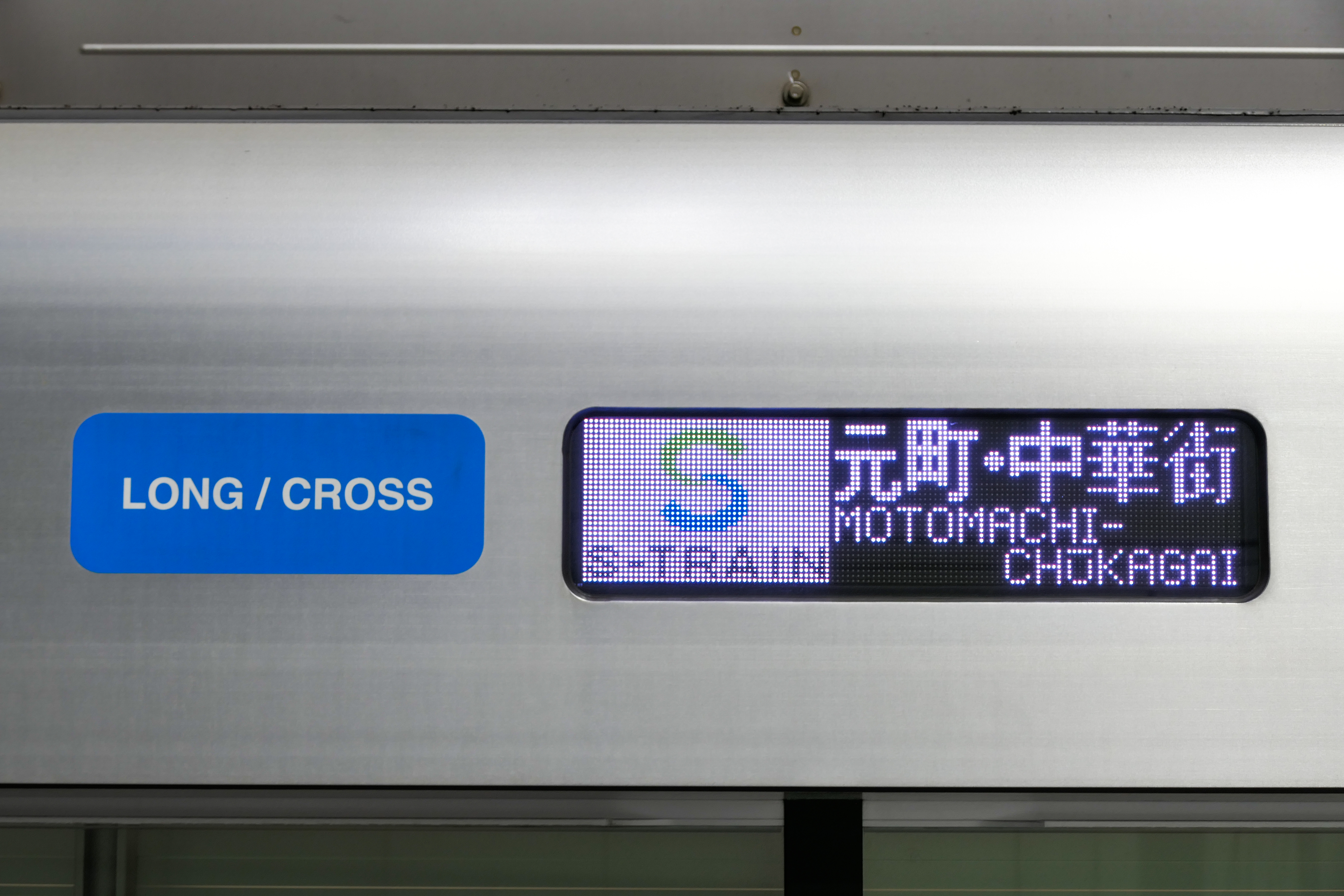
"LONG/CROSS" label beside destination LED on the exterior of the train, showing that the seat is rotational

=== 40050 series ===
Passenger accommodation consists of fixed longitudinal bench seating throughout. These seats are referred to as "LONG" seats.

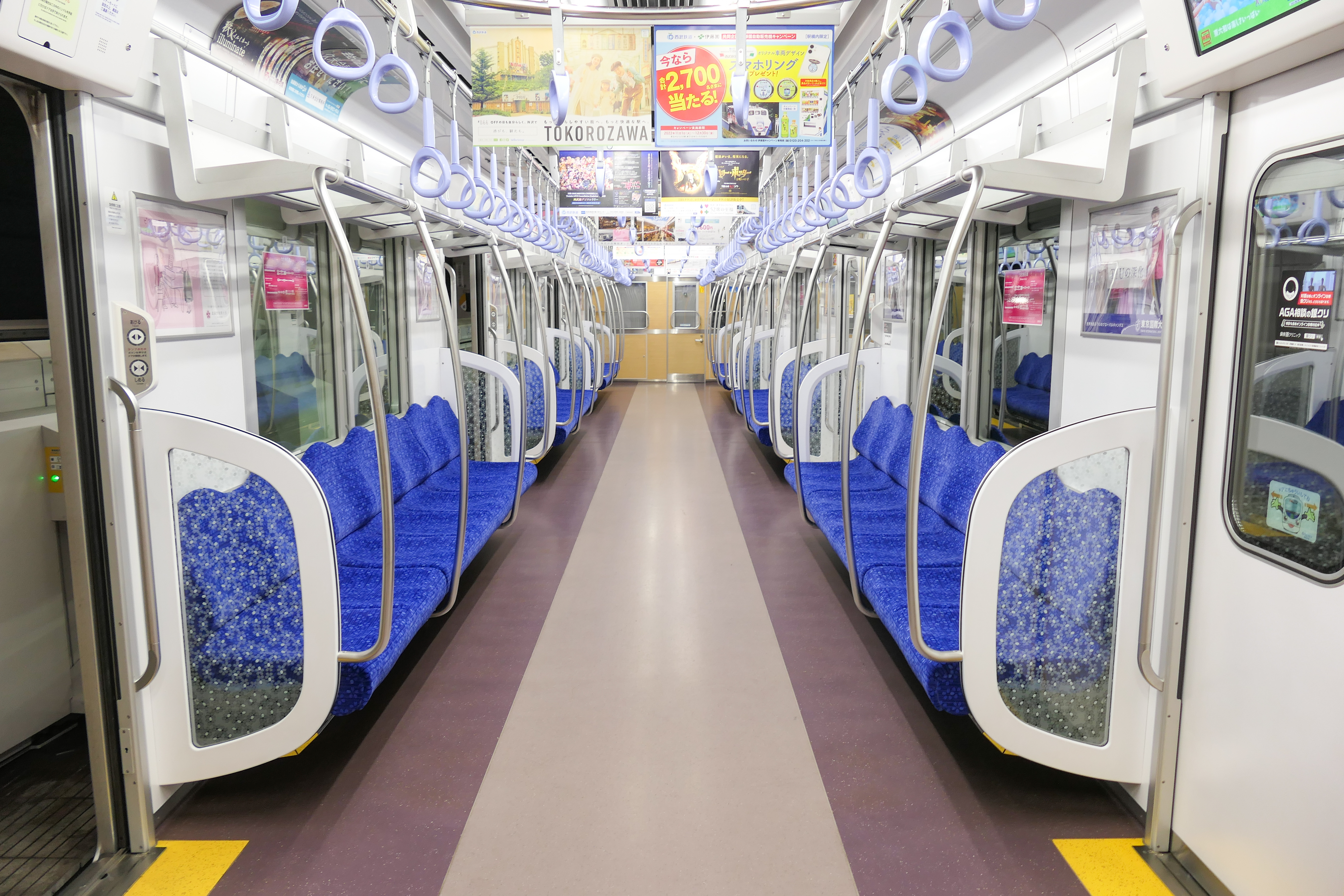
Interior view

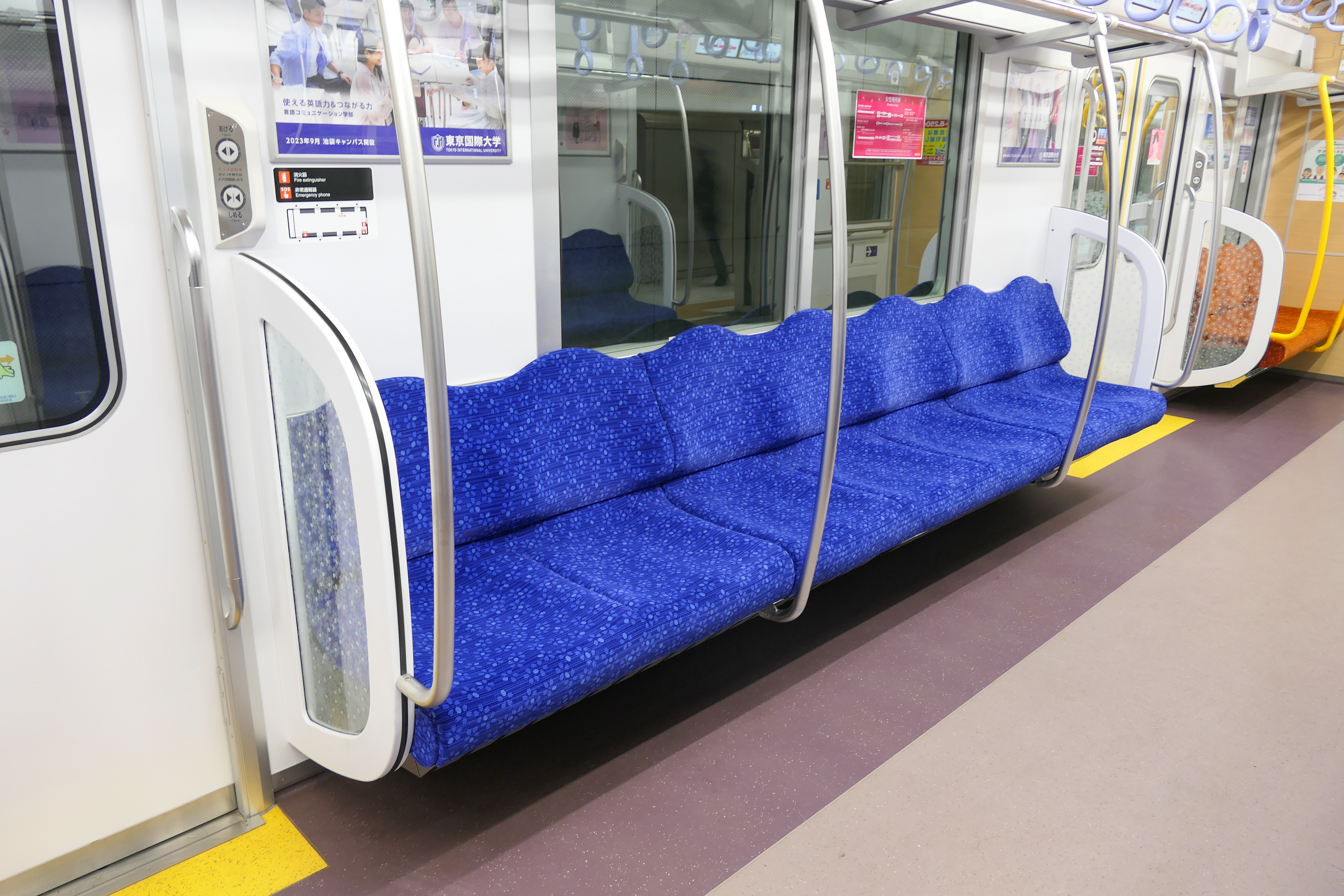
7-person bench seat

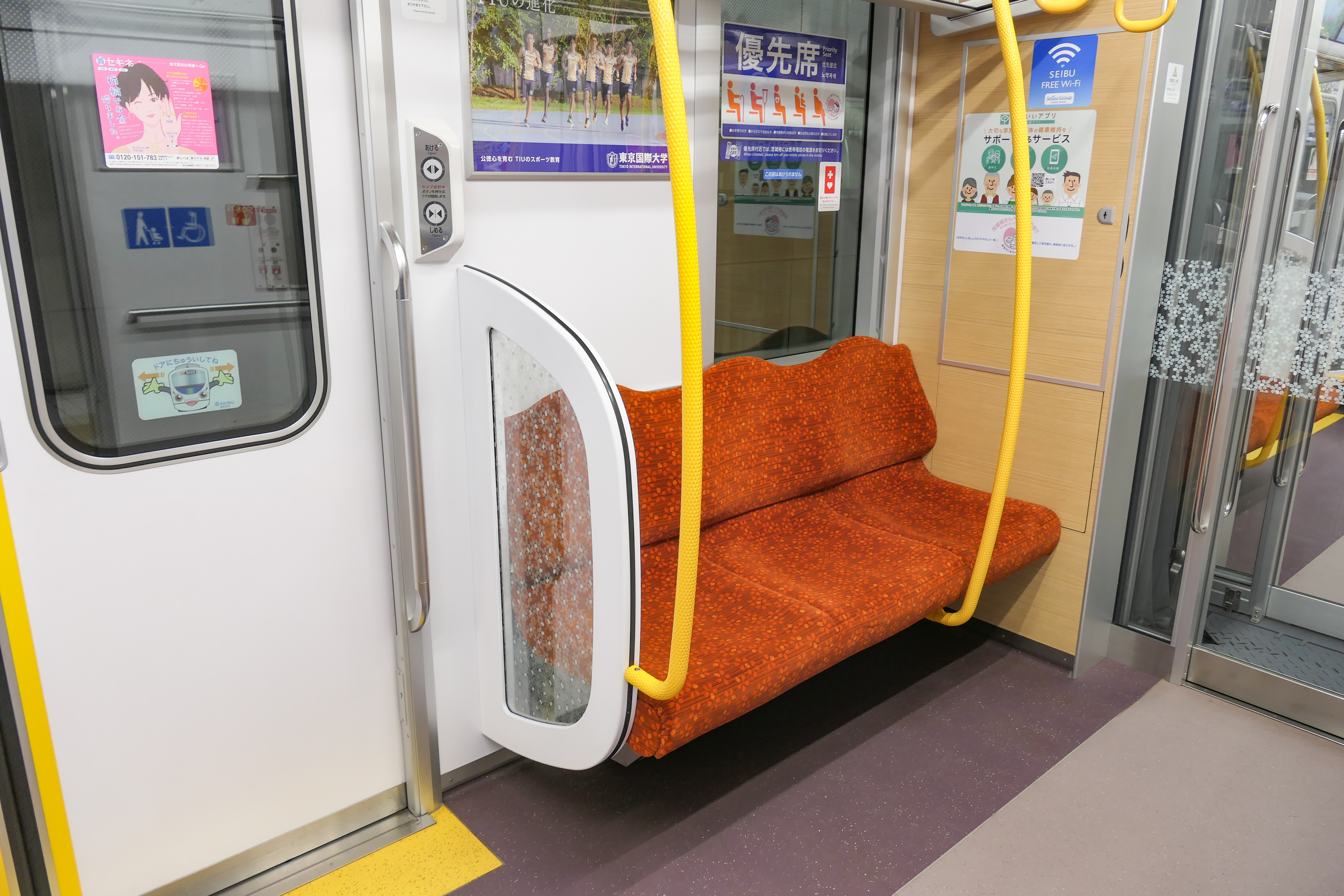
3-person seat

== History ==
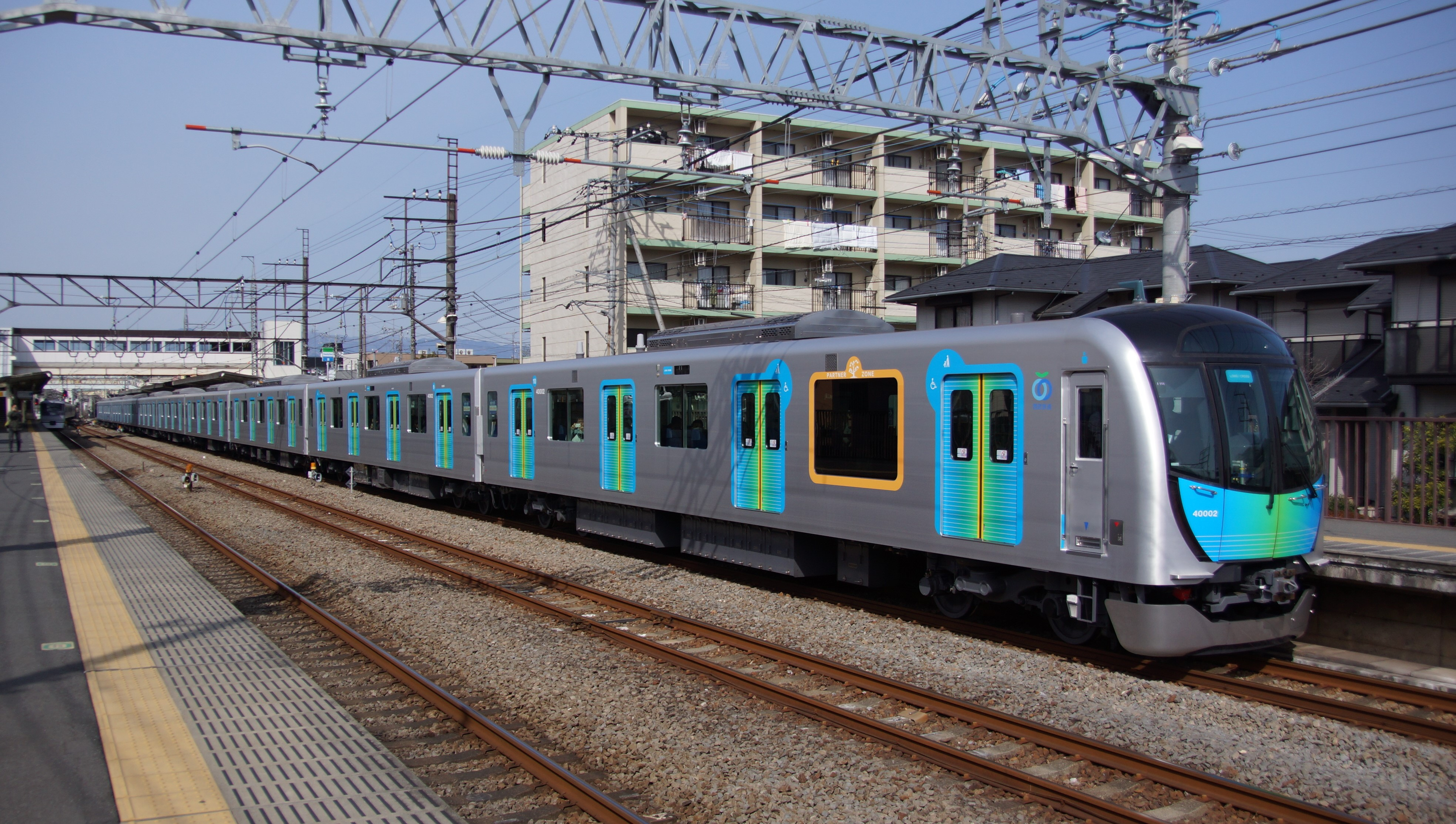
Set 40102 on an S-Train service on first day of these services on 25 March 2017

Details of the new trains were officially announced in August 2015. The first trainset, 40101, was delivered from the Kawasaki Heavy Industries factory in Kobe to Seibu's Kotesashi Depot in September 2016.

The first sets entered revenue service on S-Train services on 25 March 2017.

From spring 2018, 40000 series trains are scheduled to be used on new Haijima Liner (拝島ライナー) limited-stop supplementary-fare commuter services operating from Seibu-Shinjuku to Haijima on weekday evenings.

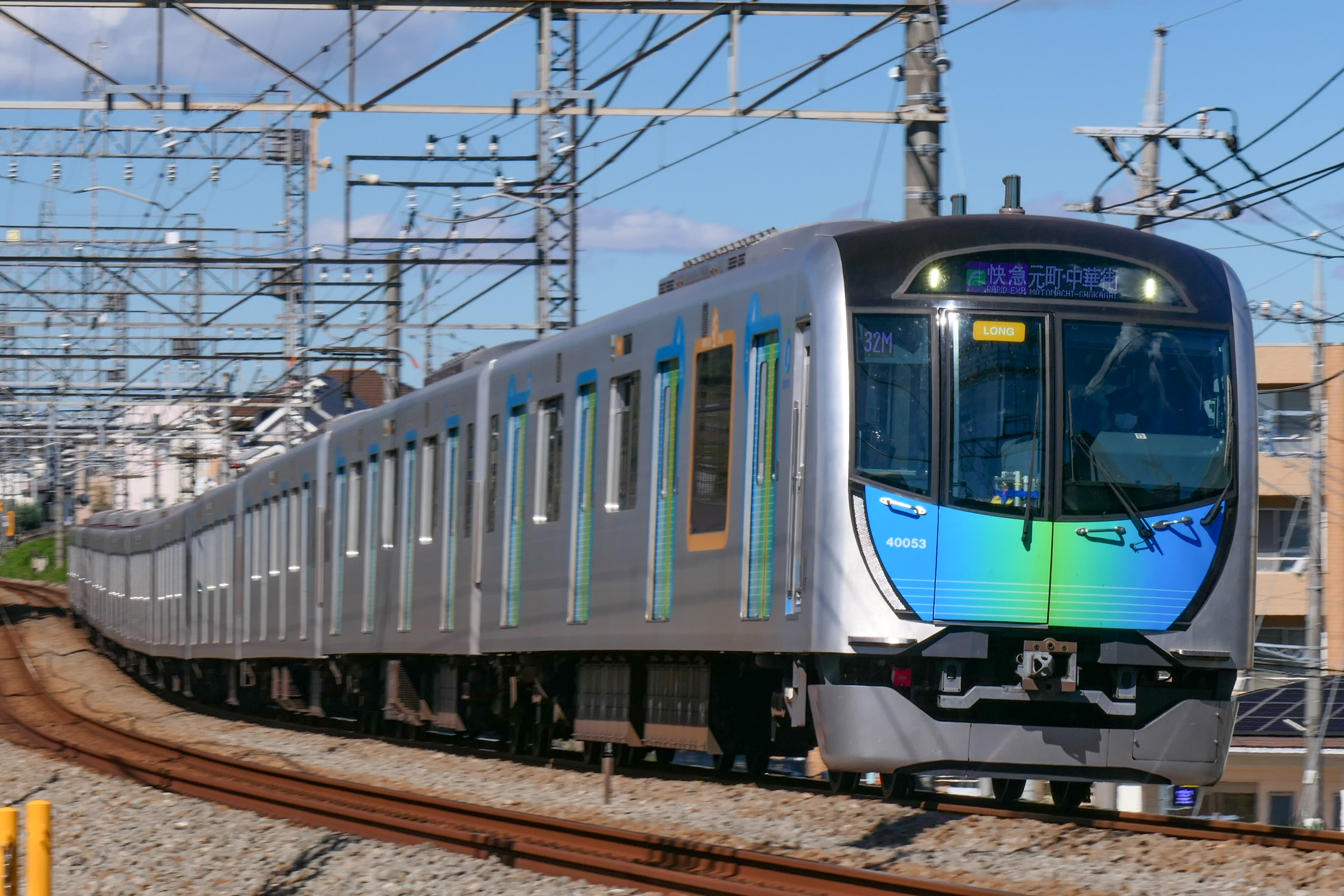
40050 series set 40153 in October 2021

In 2019, Seibu announced plans to procure two new 40000 series trainsets. These sets, numbered 40151 and 40152, were built with fixed longitudinal bench seating throughout instead of rotating seats found in older sets. Two additional sets with fixed longitudinal seating were announced in 2020 as part of the operator's investment plan for fiscal 2020, followed by another three for 2021. By November 2023, fourteen 40000 series sets with fixed longitudinal seating had been built.

In May 2024, Seibu announced plans to build three new eight-car sets as part of its fiscal 2024 capital investment plan. The first eight-car set, 48151, was delivered in December 2024.

=== Tokiiro ===
In February 2026, Seibu announced that it would introduce 8-car trains based on the 40000 series design, branded Tokiiro (トキイロ), to replace the 10000 series fleet on Shinjuku Line limited-express services. Four sets are scheduled to be introduced by the first quarter of 2027. Internally, the trains will feature rotating pairs of reclining seats throughout, and every seat will be equipped with power outlets, and cup holders. Seibu estimated that the new trains would be 17% lighter and offer 70% energy savings over the 10000 series.

The first Tokiiro set, 48101, was delivered from the Kawasaki Railcar Manufacturing plant in August 2026.

== Build histories ==
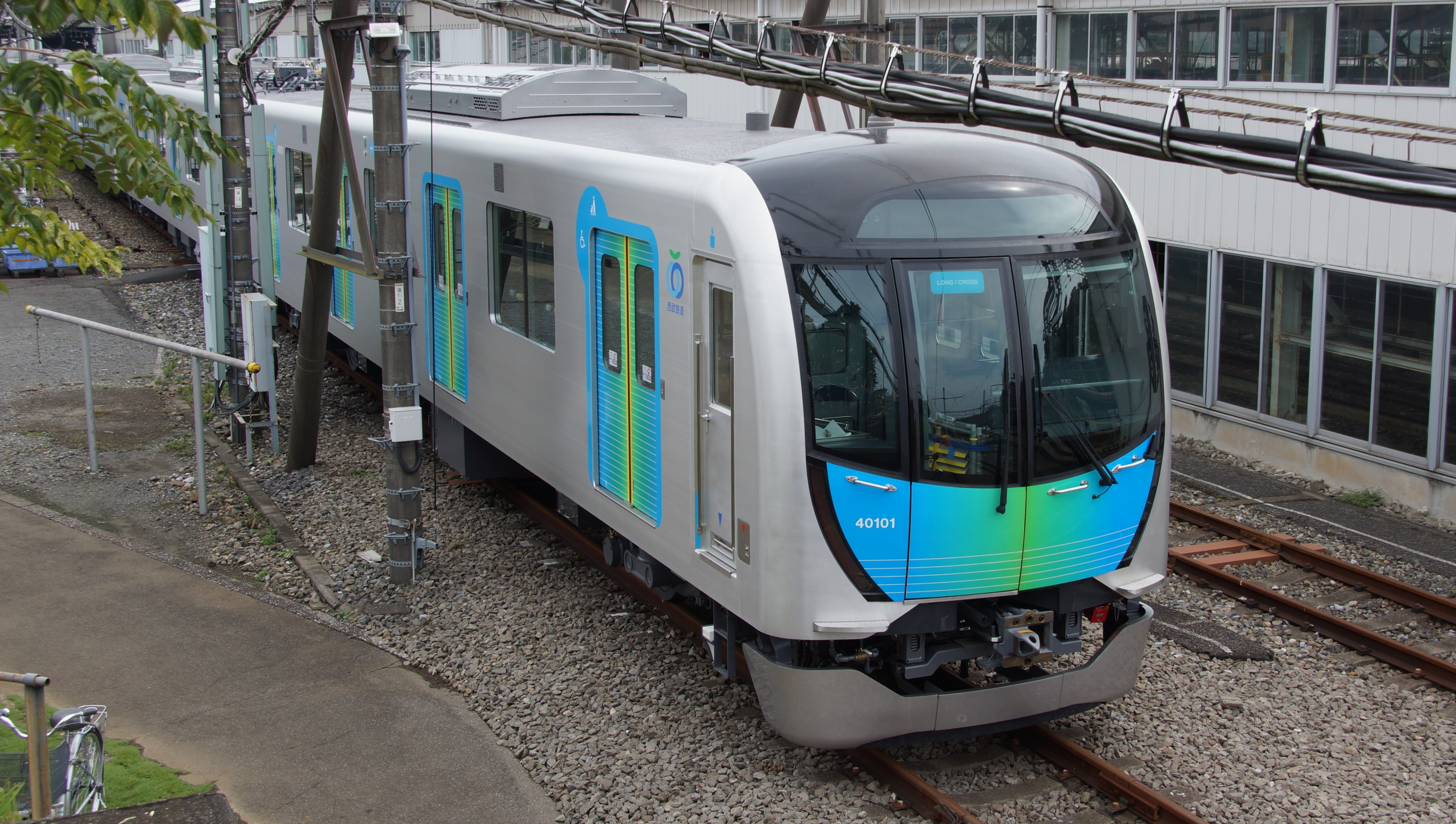
The first set, 40101, at Kotesashi Depot in September 2016, shortly after delivery

The manufacturers and delivery dates for the fleet are as shown below.

=== 10-car sets ===
Set No.	Manufacturer	Date delivered
40101	Kawasaki Heavy Industries	10 January 2017 (Note: Official acceptance date.)
40102	Kawasaki Heavy Industries	11 January 2017
40103	Kawasaki Heavy Industries	October 2017
40104	Kawasaki Heavy Industries	November 2017
40105	Kawasaki Heavy Industries	January 2018
40106	Kawasaki Heavy Industries	February 2018
40151	Kawasaki Heavy Industries	2019
40152	Kawasaki Heavy Industries	2020
40153	Kawasaki Heavy Industries	2020
40154	Kawasaki Heavy Industries	2020
40155	Kawasaki Heavy Industries	June 2021
40156		
40157	Kawasaki Railcar Manufacturing	2021
40158	Kawasaki Railcar Manufacturing	June 2022
40159	Kawasaki Railcar Manufacturing	2023
40160	Kawasaki Railcar Manufacturing	2023
40161	Kawasaki Railcar Manufacturing	2023
40162	Kawasaki Railcar Manufacturing	2023
40163	Kawasaki Railcar Manufacturing	2023
40164	Kawasaki Railcar Manufacturing	2023

=== 8-car sets ===
Set No.	Manufacturer	Date delivered
48151	Kawasaki Railcar Manufacturing	December 2024
48152	Kawasaki Railcar Manufacturing	February 2025
48153	Kawasaki Railcar Manufacturing	March 2025
48154		
48155	Kawasaki Railcar Manufacturing	September 2025
48101	Kawasaki Railcar Manufacturing	August 2026

== See also ==
- Tobu 50090 series and 70090 series, Tobu Railway commuter EMU types that also features rotating longitudinal/transverse seating
- Keio 5000 series, a Keio commuter EMU type that also features rotating longitudinal/transverse seating
- Keikyu 2100 series, a Keikyu commuter EMU type that also features transverse seating
- Keikyu N1000 series, another Keikyu commuter EMU type also features rotating transverse seating (batch 20 only)
