= Target Shooting New Zealand =

Sports governing body

- Sport: Shooting Sports
- Jurisdiction: New Zealand
- Abbreviation: TSNZ
- Affiliation: New Zealand Shooting Federation
- Headquarters: Gonville

Official website
- tsnz.nz
- (New Zealand)

Target Shooting New Zealand (TSNZ) is the national governing body for smallbore and air rifle target shooting in New Zealand. TSNZ is a constituent member of the New Zealand Shooting Federation, which manages the New Zealand Olympic and world championship shooting teams, and represents New Zealand shooting within the International Shooting Sport Federation (ISSF) and other international bodies.

== History ==
TSNZ supports about 120 rifle clubs across New Zealand, organising postal matches and meetings, as well as inter-island matches between North and South Island, and international matches against Australia. A schools match, including a schools inter-island match, is held annually.

TSNZ selects New Zealand's team for the Drew Match, an international postal for under-21 teams from New Zealand, Great Britain, Australia, South Africa and the USA. In 2021, New Zealand won the women's team-of-3 match, and was runner-up in both the men's team-of-3 and main (team-of-10) matches.

In 2022, TSNZ started rolling out ISSF Target Sprint in New Zealand, predominantly within schools.
