= Seibu 001 series =

Japanese electric multiple unit limited express train type operated by Seibu

Seibu 001 series Laview
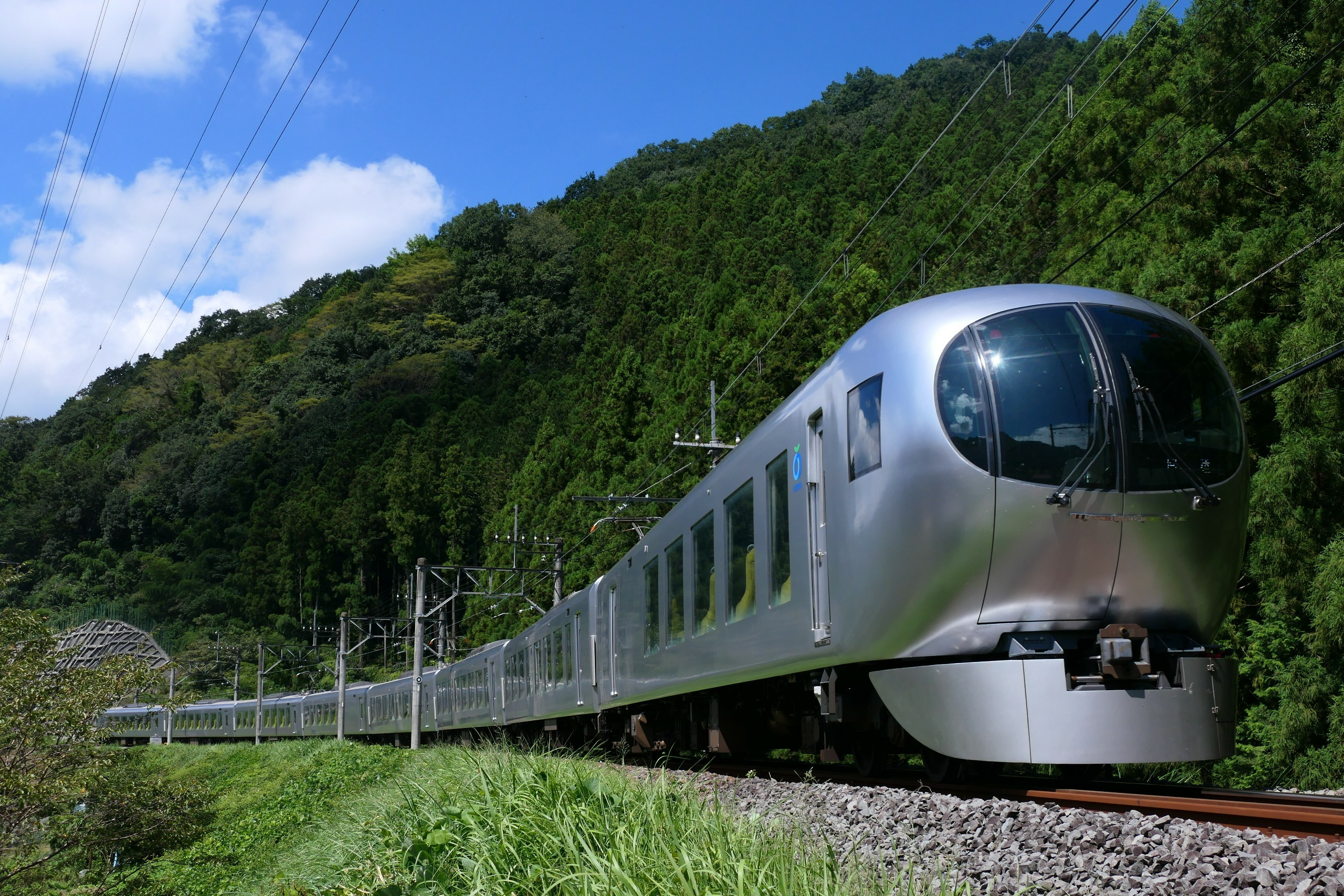
- Set 001-A in September 2019
- In service: 2019 – Present
- Manufacturer: Hitachi Rail
- Designer: Kazuyo Sejima
- Family name: Hitachi A-train
- Replaced: Seibu 10000 series
- Constructed: 2018–2020
- Entered service: 16 March 2019
- Number built: 56 vehicles (7 sets)
- Formation: 8 cars per trainset
- Fleet numbers: 001-A – 001-G
- Operator: Seibu Railway
- Depot: Kotesashi
- Lines served: Ikebukuro Line; Seibu Chichibu Line

Specifications
- Car body construction: Aluminum
- Doors: 1 per side
- Maximum speed: 120 km/h (75 mph)
- Traction system: 2-level SiC-MOSFET–VVVF (Mitsubishi Electric)
- Traction motors: 8 × 190 kW (255 hp) totally-enclosed 3-phase AC induction motor (Mitsubishi Electric)
- Power output: 2.72 MW (3,648 hp)
- Acceleration: 3.3 km/(h⋅s) (2.1 mph/s)
- Deceleration: 3.5 km/(h⋅s) (2.2 mph/s) (service); 4.5 km/(h⋅s) (2.8 mph/s) (emergency)
- Auxiliaries: Toyo Denki IGBT–SIV output 260 kVA auxiliary power supply
- Electric systems: 1,500 V DC overhead catenary
- Current collection: Pantograph
- Track gauge: 1,067 mm (3 ft 6 in)

Notes/references
- This train won the 63rd Blue Ribbon Award in 2020.

The Seibu 001 series (西武001系), also known as "Laview", is an electric multiple unit (EMU) train type operated by the private railway operator Seibu Railway on limited express services in the Tokyo area of Japan. They will replace the 10000 series EMUs currently in service on the Seibu Ikebukuro Line and Chichibu Line.

== Design ==
The trains are designed by Kazuyo Sejima, and feature large windows and a rounded front end with an oval windscreen.

Based on the concept of "a new train that no one has ever seen before," it was designed based on the following design concepts.

- A limited express that blends softly into the landscape in the city and nature
- A limited express like a living room where everyone can relax
- A limited express that creates new value and becomes a destination, not just a means of transportation
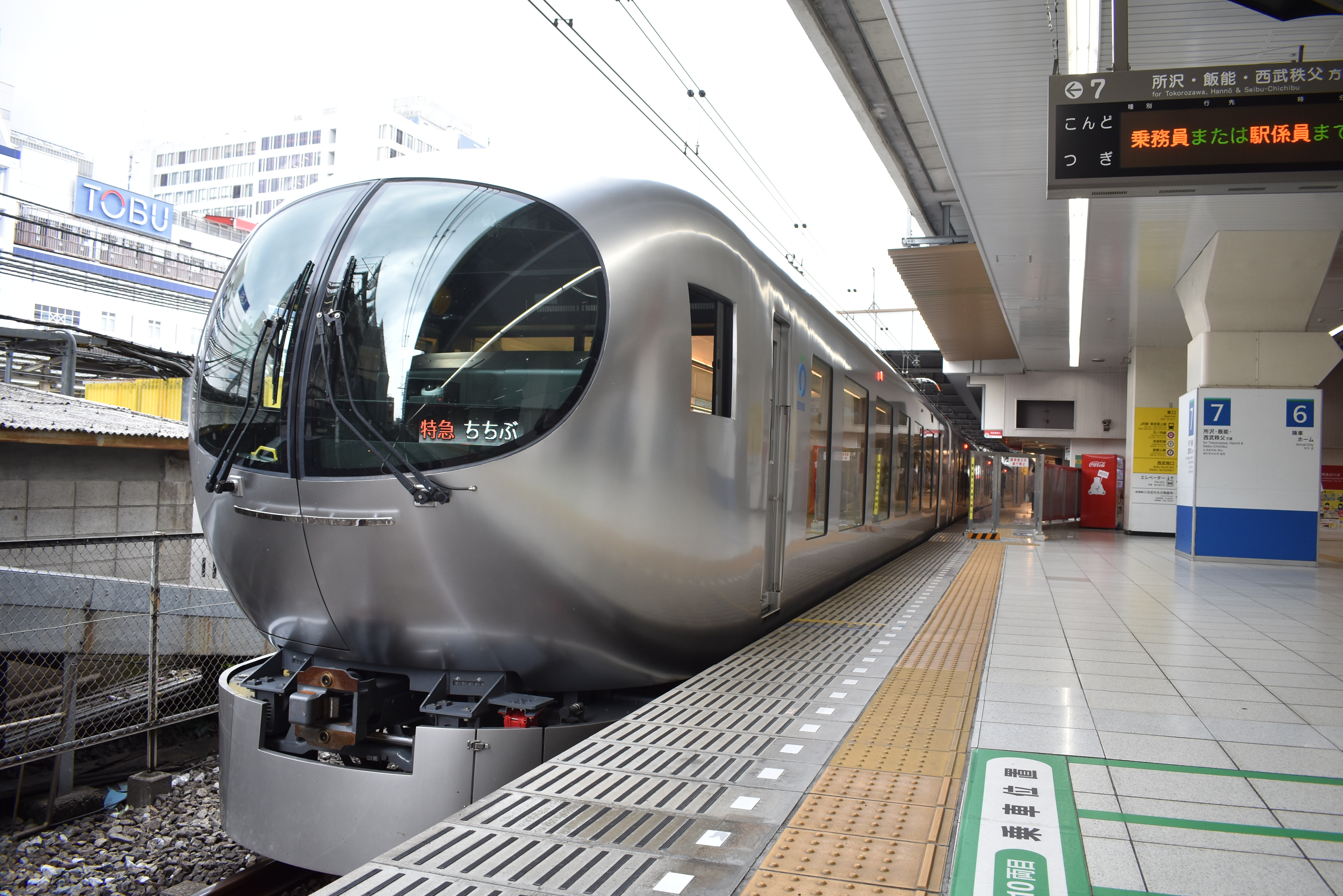
Rounded front

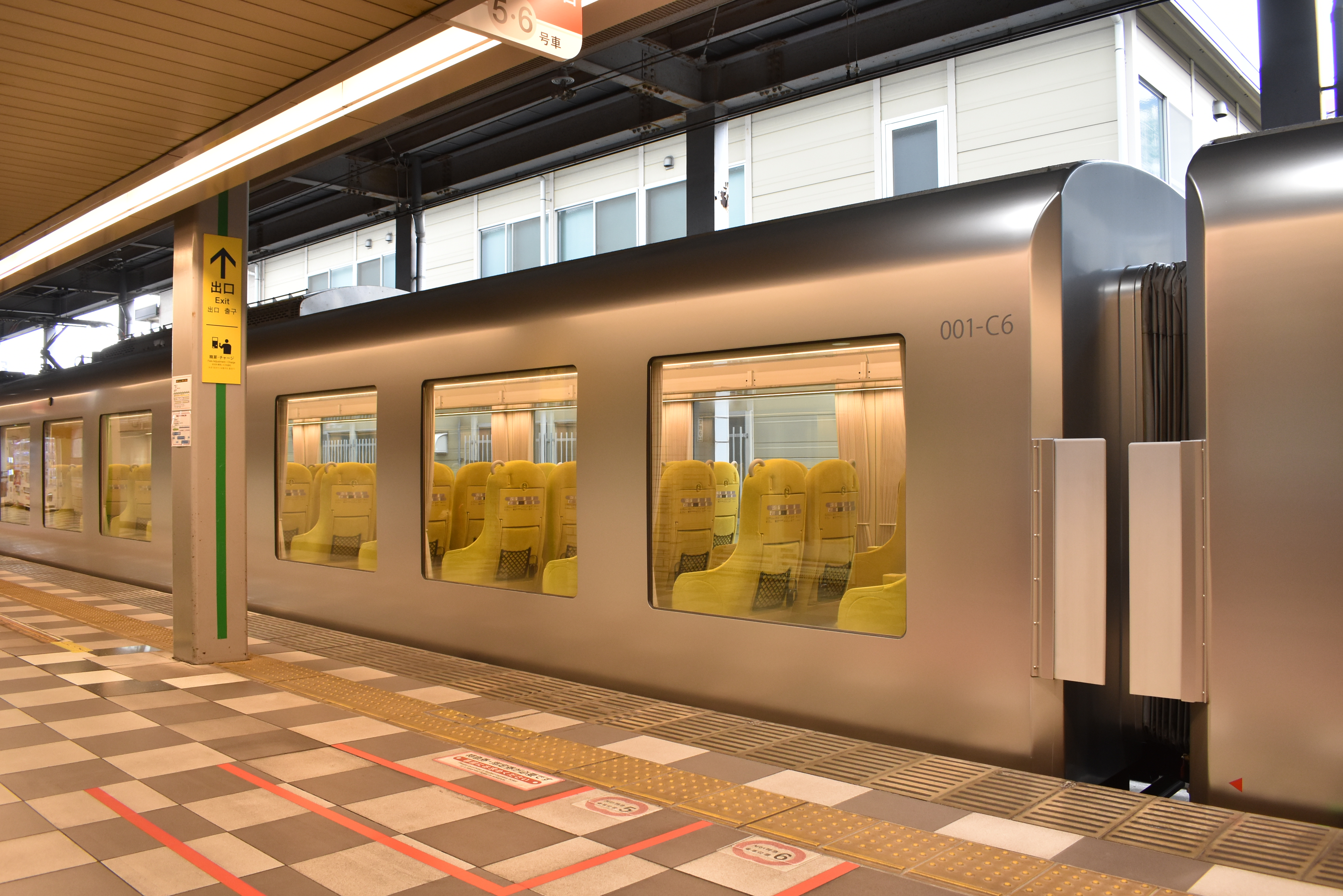
Exterior, showing large windows

== Formation ==
The trains consist of eight cars per set.

| | ← Hannō Ikebukuro → | | | | | | | |
| Car No. | 1 | 2 | 3 | 4 | 5 | 6 | 7 | 8 |
| Designation | KuHa 001-01 (Tc1) | MoHa 001-02 (M1) | MoHa 001-03 (M2) | SaHa 001-04 (T1) | SaHa 001-05 (T3) | MoHa 001-06 (M5) | MoHa 001-07 (M6) | KuHa 001-08 (Tc2) |
| Numbering | 001-A1 ∥ | 001-A2 ∥ | 001-A3 ∥ | 001-A4 ∥ | 001-A5 ∥ | 001-A6 ∥ | 001-A7 ∥ | 001-A8 ∥ |

== Interior ==
Seating accommodation consists of 2+2 seating, with power outlets at all seats. The interior also features wheelchair spaces and a ladies’ powder room. Free WiFi is provided in all cars.

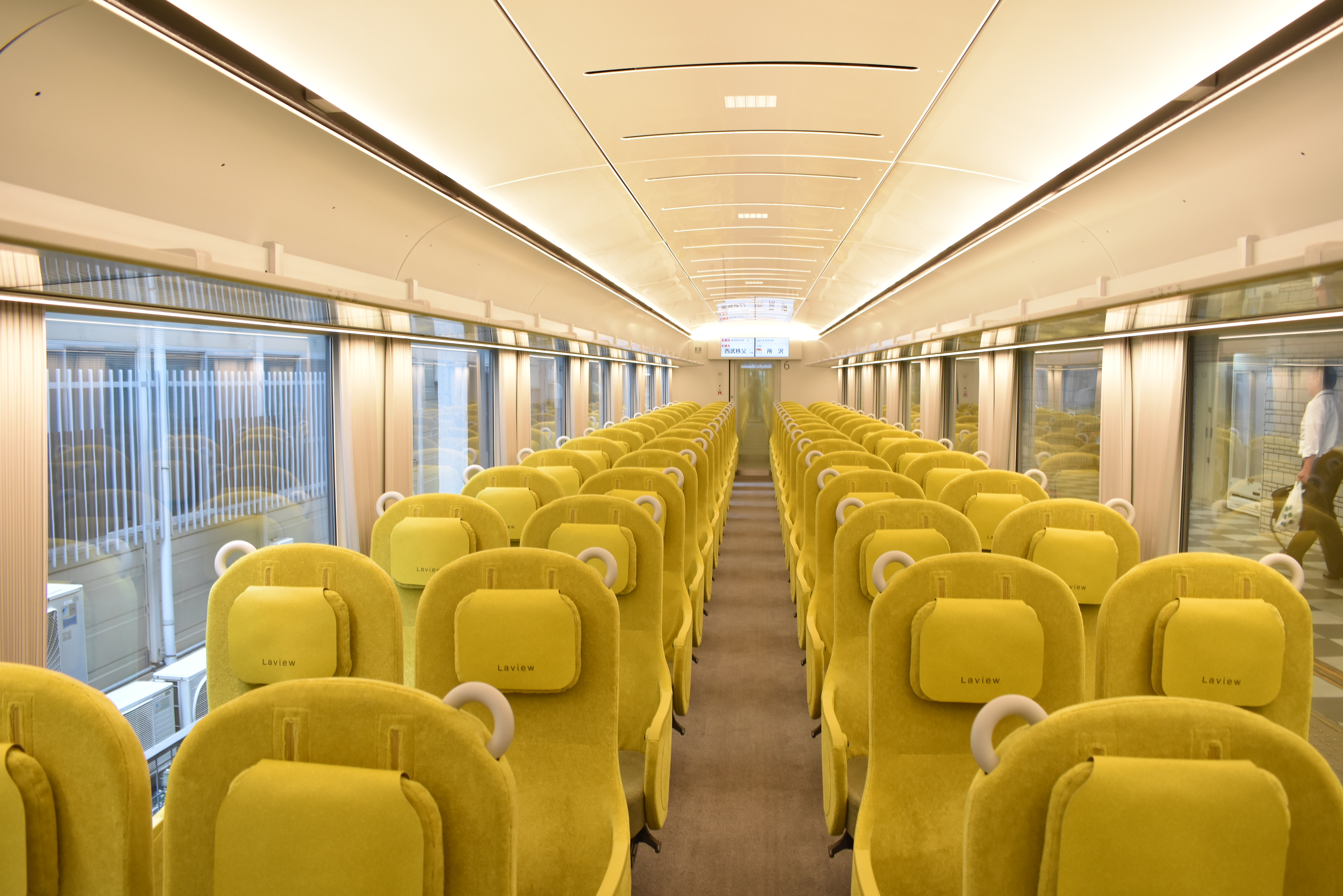
Interior

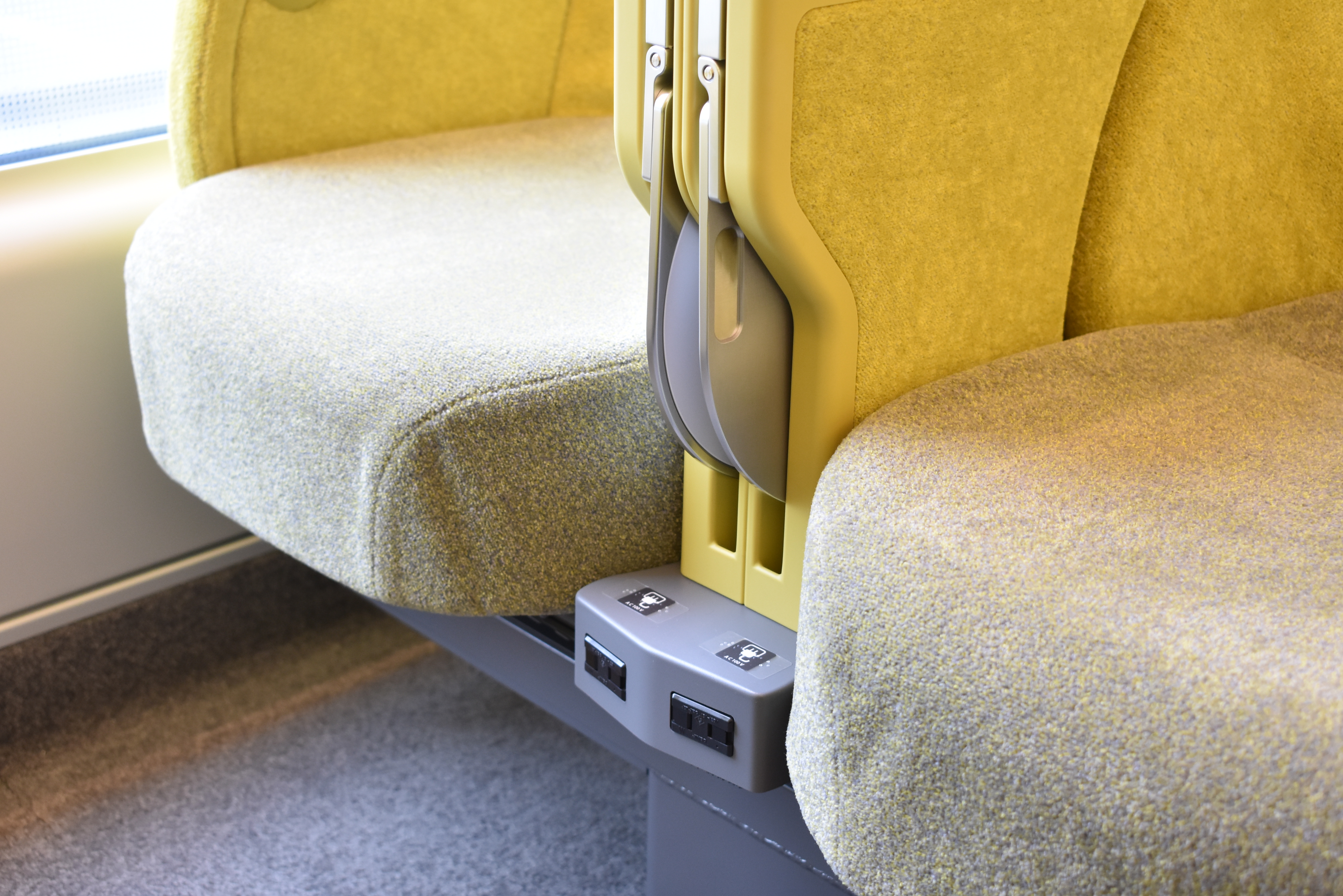
Power outlets

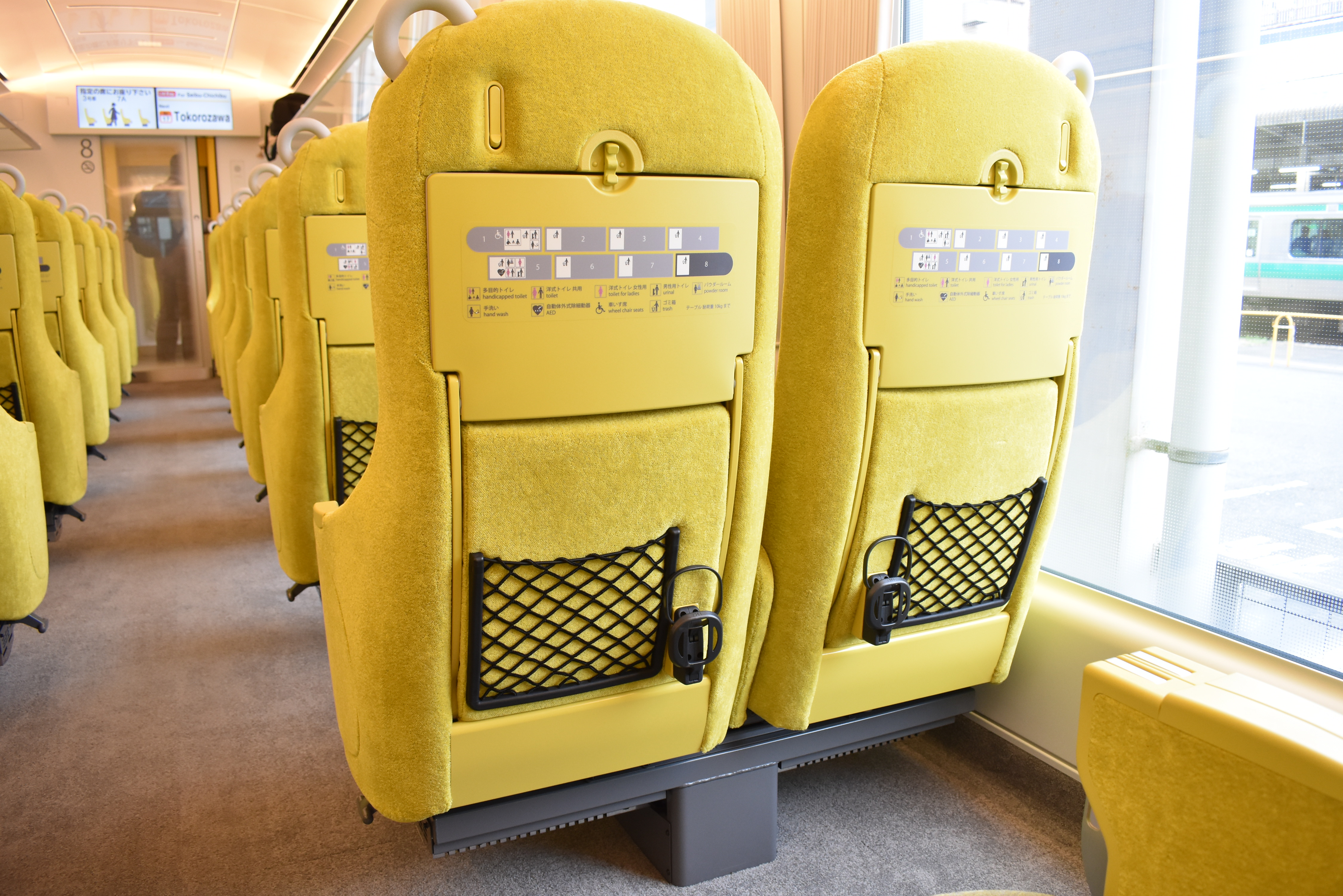
Seats

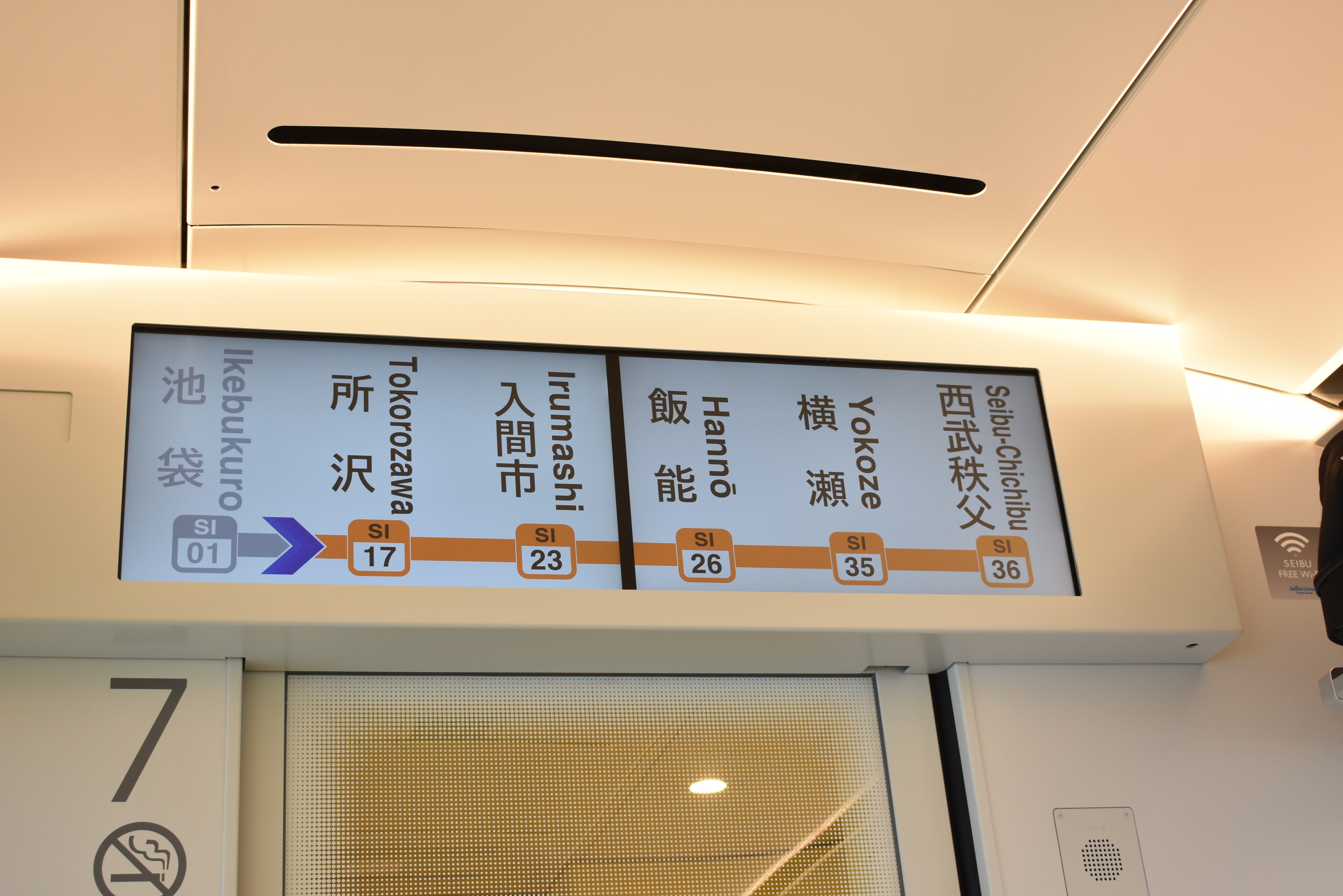
Passenger information screens

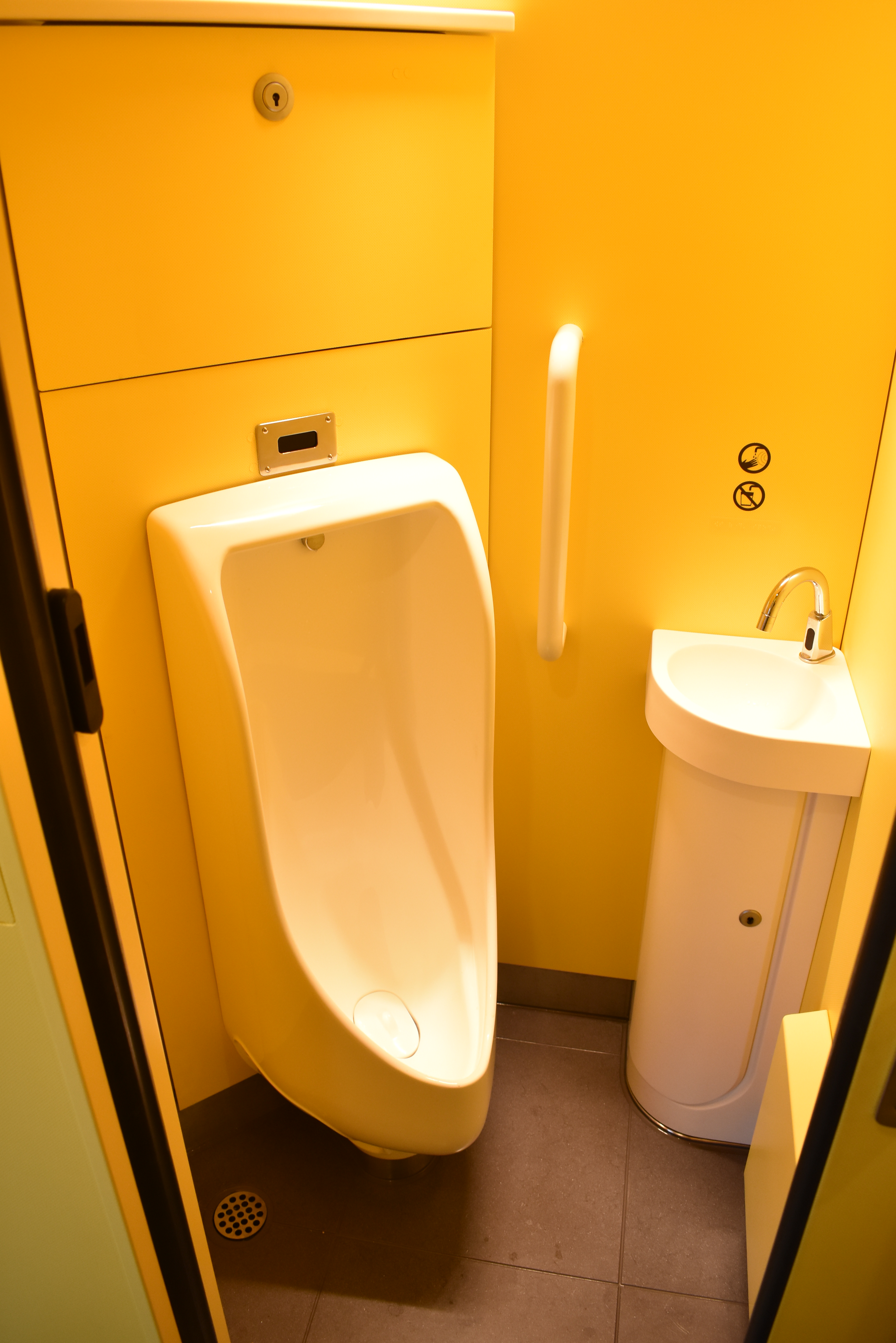
Toilet

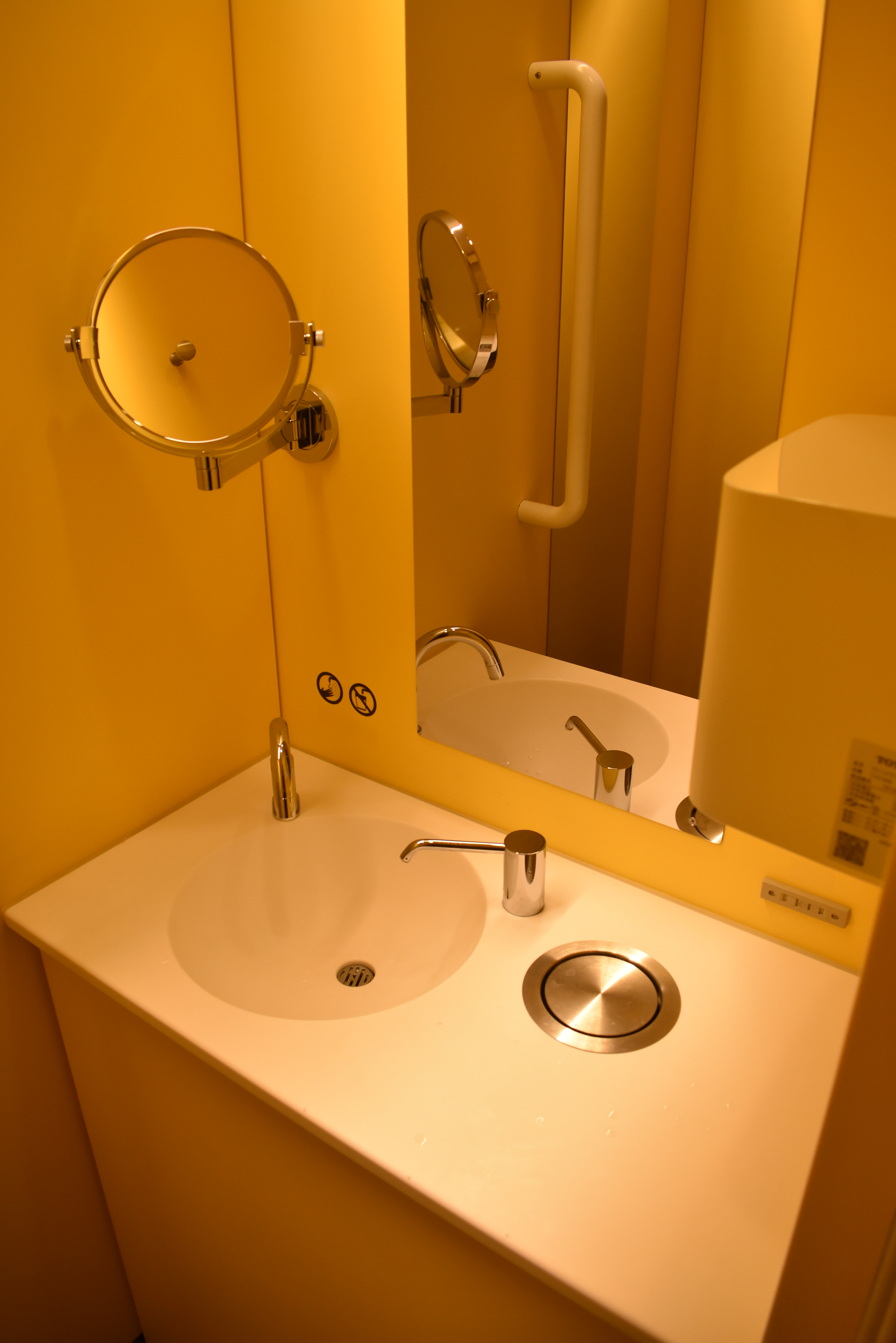
Powder room

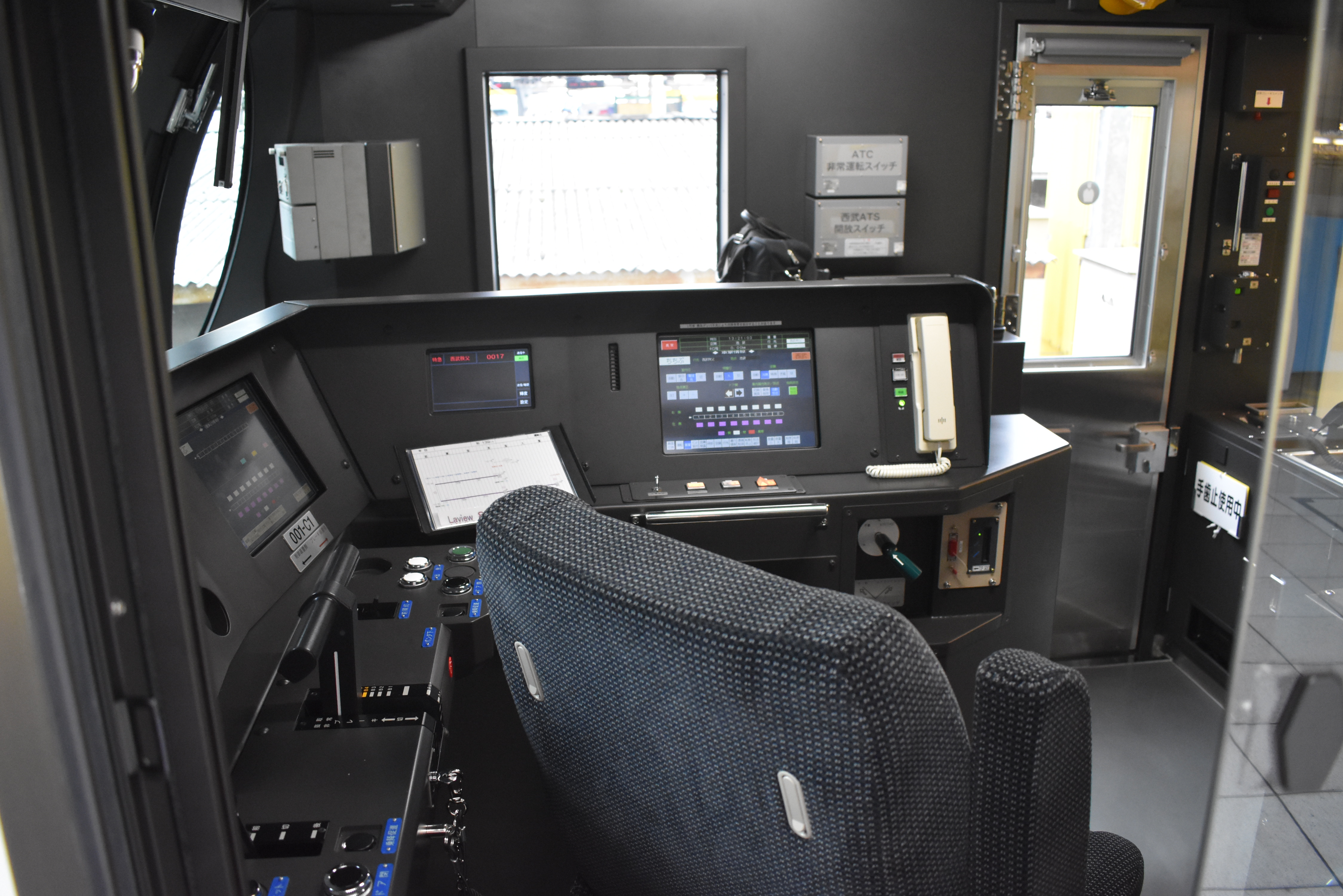
Cab of a 001 series train

== History ==
Seven sets were ordered as a replacement for the New Red Arrow EMUs. The first set was presented to reporters at Kotesashi depot on 14 February 2019. The 001 series entered revenue service on 16 March 2019.

In 2020, the train type received the Blue Ribbon Award.

=== Vies ===
On 21 October 2025, Seibu announced its plans to procure a restaurant train based on the 001 series. The new train will be composed of four cars. It is planned to enter service in March 2028 on various Seibu lines including the Ikebukuro Line, Shinjuku Line, and Chichibu Line and to serve as a successor for the Fifty-two Seats of Happiness trainset.

In March 2026, Seibu announced that the restaurant train would be branded Fine Dining Train "vies".
