= Pistol New Zealand =

Sports governing body in New Zealand

- Parent organization: International Metallic Silhouette Shooting Union, International Practical Shooting Confederation, International Shooting Sport Federation, Muzzle Loaders Associations International Committee, PPC 1500
- Website: pistolnz.org.nz

Pistol New Zealand (PNZ) is the umbrella sporting federation of handgun shooting sports and clubs in New Zealand. Pistol New Zealand was formerly known as the New Zealand Pistol Association (NZPA).

== History ==
The New Zealand Pistol Association was created in 1969 and incorporated the following year. Its first goal was to pass provisions for target pistol shooters to have pistols. Thanks to its lobbying efforts, the annual government fee for owning a pistol was lowered in 1983 to a reasonable level for individual ownership (though the government reversed this decision a decade later).

In 2002, the New Zealand Pistol Association changed its name to Pistol New Zealand (PNZ).

== Description ==
The federation comprises over 80 clubs nationally. PNZ is affiliated with the following shooting sports:

- Metallic silhouette under International Metallic Silhouette Shooting Union
- Practical shooting under International Practical Shooting Confederation
- ISSF shooting events under International Shooting Sport Federation
- Cowboy action shooting
- Muzzle Loading under Muzzle Loaders Associations International Committee
- Action shooting under Precision Pistol Competition

According to the Arms Act of 1983, the PNZ specifies the authorized ammunition to use for pistol target shooting disciplines in New Zealand.

The PNZ publishes the bi-monthly magazine Bullshooter.
