= Seibu 10000 series =

Electric multiple unit train type operated in Japan by Seibu Railway

Seibu 10000 series New Red Arrow
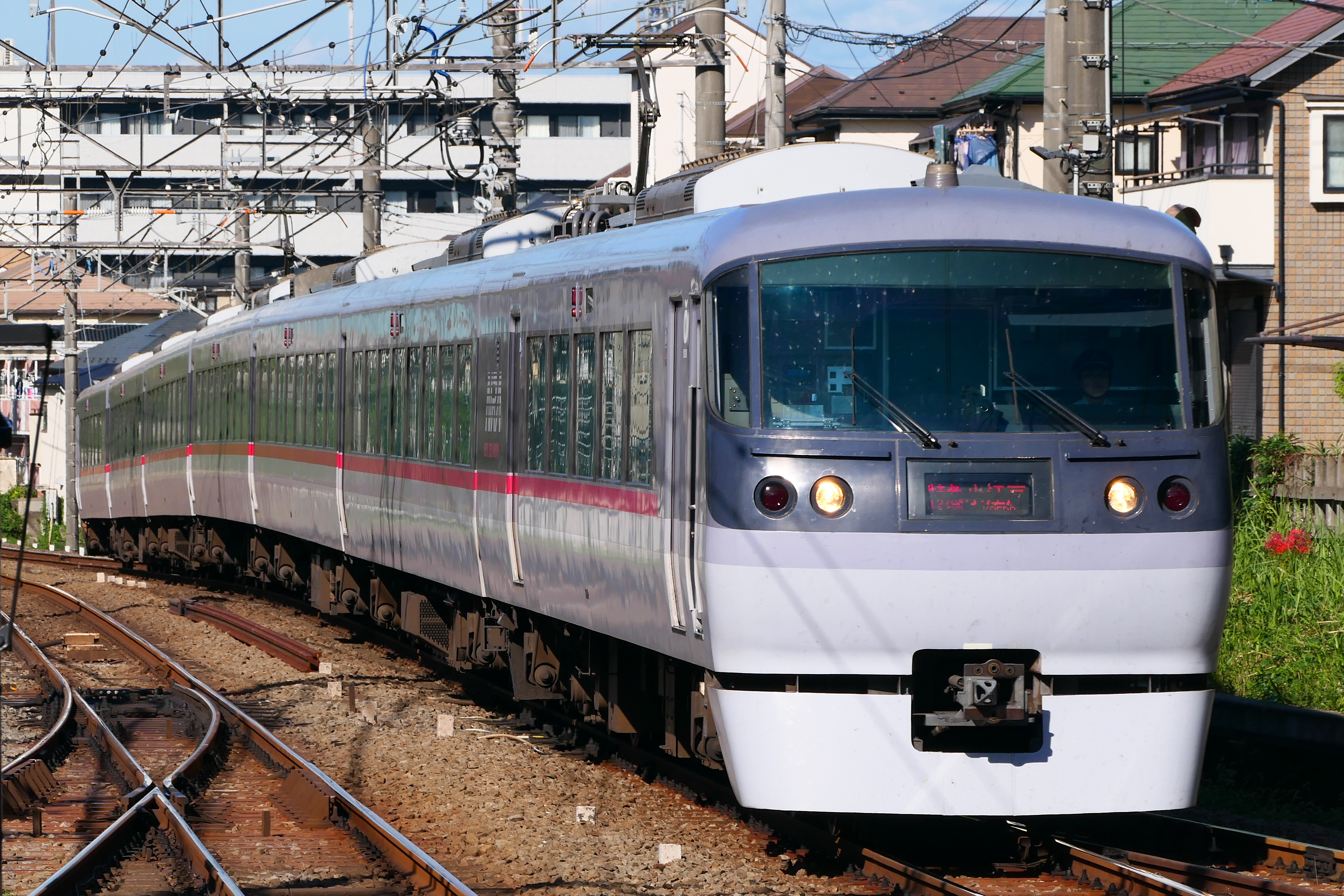
- 10000 series on a Koedo service in October 2023
- Manufacturer: Hitachi
- Replaced: 5000 series
- Constructed: 1993–2003
- Entered service: 6 December 1993
- Refurbished: 2003–2008
- Number built: 84 vehicles (12 sets)
- Number in service: 84 vehicles (12 sets)
- Successor: Seibu 001 series
- Formation: 7 cars per trainset
- Operator: Seibu Railway
- Depots: Kotesashi, Minami-Iriso
- Lines served: Ikebukuro Line (Note: Until 13 March 2020); Seibu Chichibu Line; Shinjuku Line

Specifications
- Car length: 20 m (65 ft 7 in)
- Doors: One per side
- Maximum speed: 105 km/h (65 mph)
- Traction system: Resistor control Variable frequency (3-level IGBT) (set 10112)
- Electric system: 1,500 V DC
- Current collection: Overhead line
- Braking system: Dynamic braking
- Track gauge: 1,067 mm (3 ft 6 in)

The Seibu 10000 series (西武10000系) is an electric multiple unit (EMU) train type operated by the private railway operator Seibu Railway on limited express services in the Tokyo area of Japan since 1993.

== Operations ==
Branded as "NRA" or "New Red Arrow", the trains are used on Koedo services from Seibu-Shinjuku in Tokyo to Hon-Kawagoe. They were formerly also used on Musashi and Chichibu services from Ikebukuro in Tokyo to Hannō and Seibu-Chichibu stations.

== Formation ==
As of 1 April 2012, the fleet consists of 12 7-car sets, formed as follows.

Car No.	1	2	3	4	5	6	7
Designation	Tc1	M1	M2	T	M3	M4	Tc2
Numbering	10100	10200	10300	10400	10500	10600	10700

Cars 2, 5, and 6 each have one single-arm pantograph, except set 10112, which has pantographs on cars 2 and 5 only.

== History ==
The first two trains delivered were introduced in December 1993 on Koedo services from Seibu-Shinjuku in Tokyo to Hon-Kawagoe, replacing the former 5000 series Red Arrow trains.

A further three trainsets were delivered in 1994 and introduced on Chichibu services from Ikebukuro in Tokyo to Seibu-Chichibu on 15 October 1994.

The trains were refurbished internally between 2003 and 2008, and the old seats were re-used in Chichibu Railway 6000 series and Izukyu 8000 series trainsets.

On 13 March 2020, the 10000 series trainsets were withdrawn from Ikebukuro Line and Chichibu Line limited express services, being replaced by 001 series Laview trainsets. Since then, the fleet of 10000 series has been used on limited express service on the Seibu Shinjuku Line.

Three cars were transferred to the Toyama Chihō Railway in October 2020. After spending 2021 undergoing preparation, they entered service on 19 February 2022.

=== Future ===
In February 2026, Seibu announced its plans to replace the 10000 series on Shinjuku Line limited-express services with new trains based on the 40000 series design beginning in the first quarter of 2027. The operator also announced on 21 April of that year that it plans to modify set 10112 for use as a sightseeing limited express train on the Shinjuku Line; the set is scheduled to enter revenue service in fiscal 2028.

== Interior ==
The sets are monoclass with 2+2 abreast reclining seating. Seat pitch is 1,070 mm (42 in).

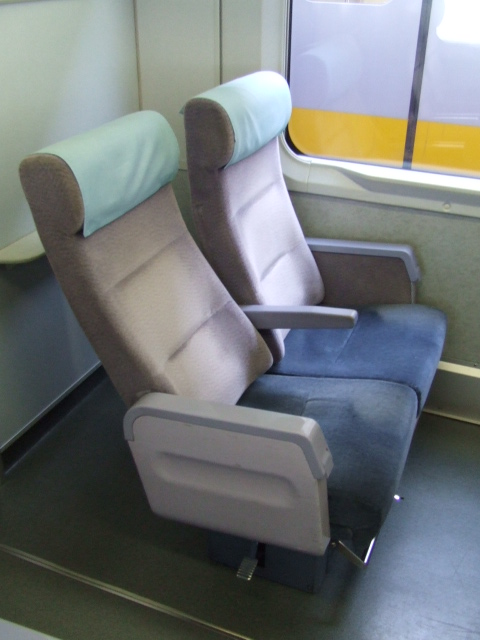
Original seating in September 2006

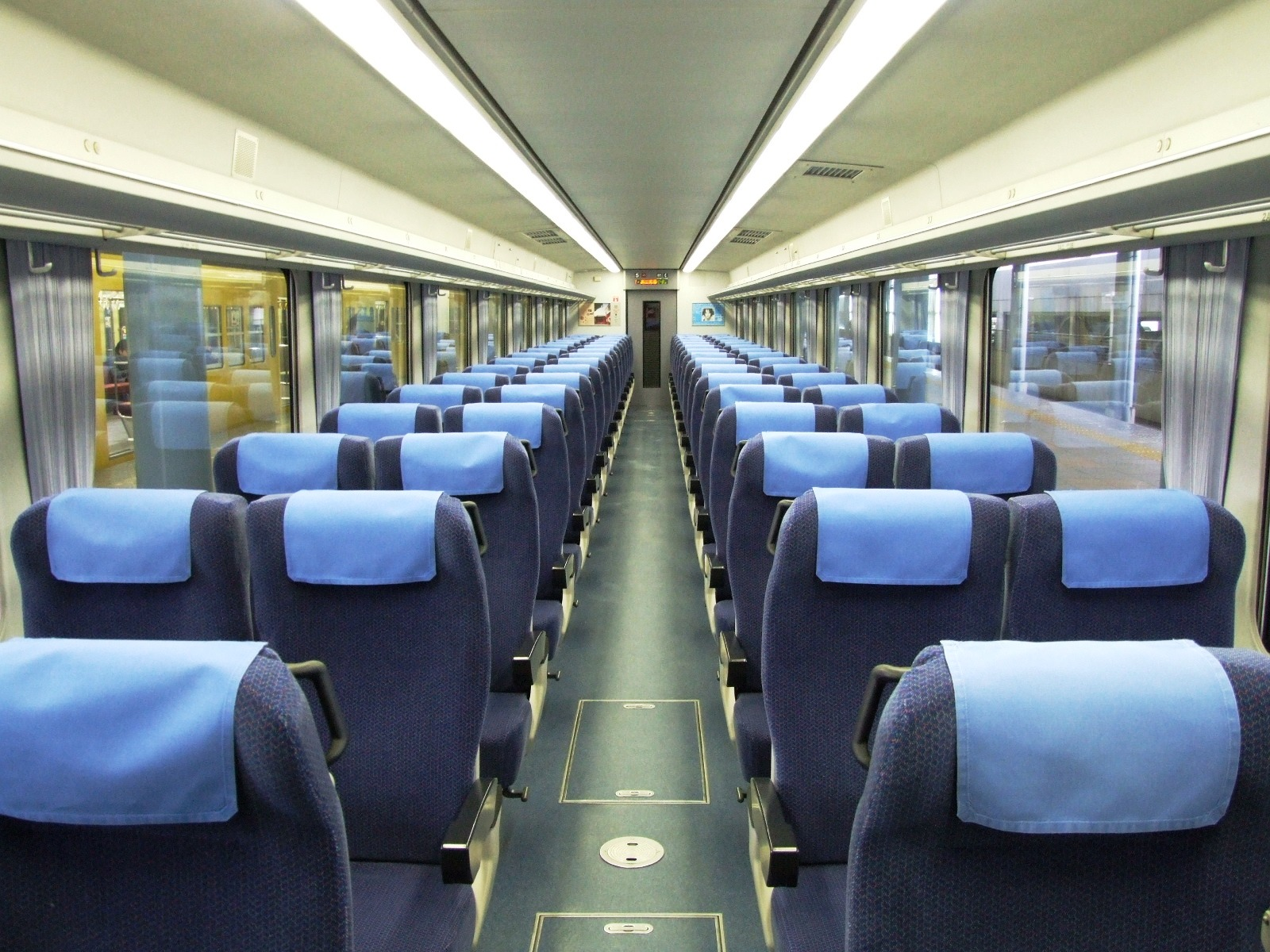
Interior view showing new seating in January 2009

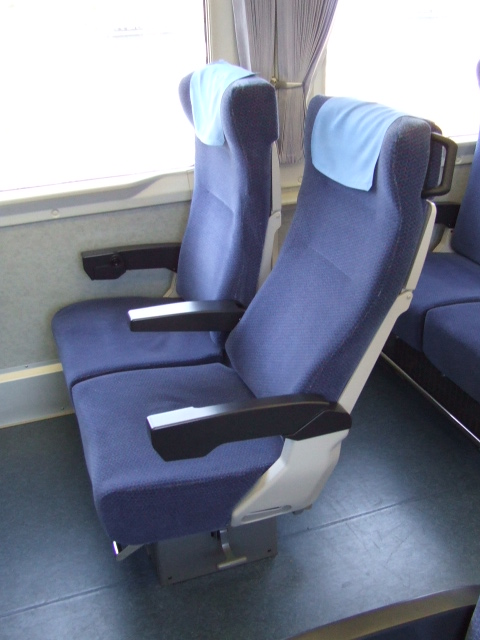
New seating in September 2006

== Livery variations ==
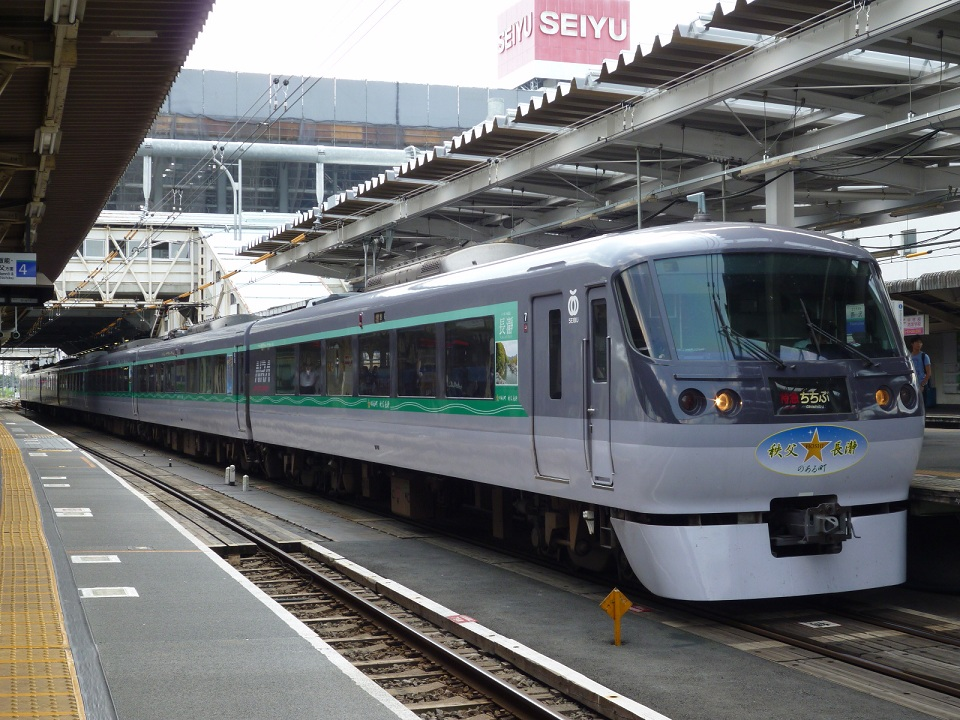
Set 10107 in Nagatoro advertising livery in August 2011

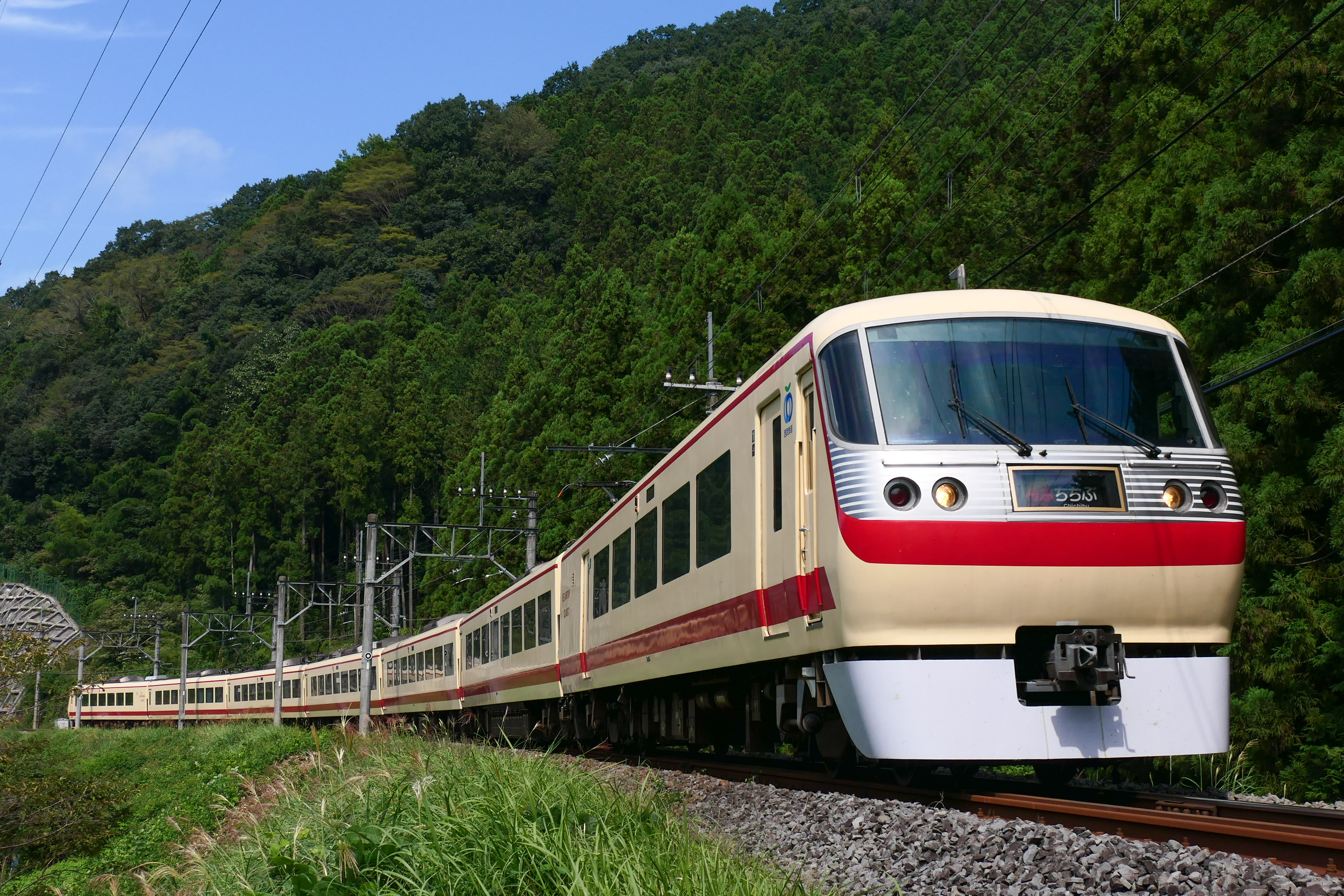
Set 10105 in Red Arrow Classic livery in September 2019

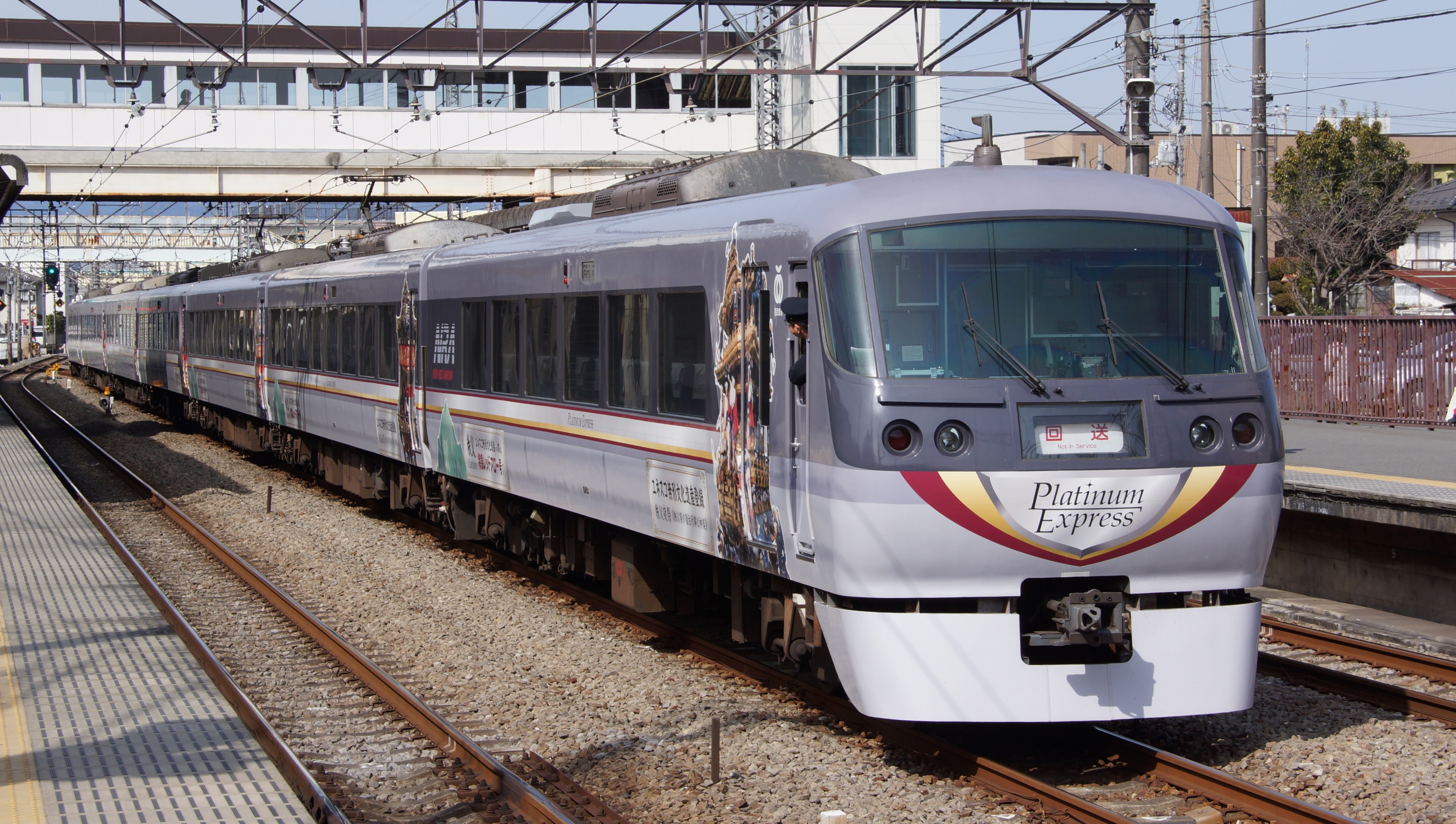
Set 10103 in Platinum Express Chichibu Ver. livery in March 2017

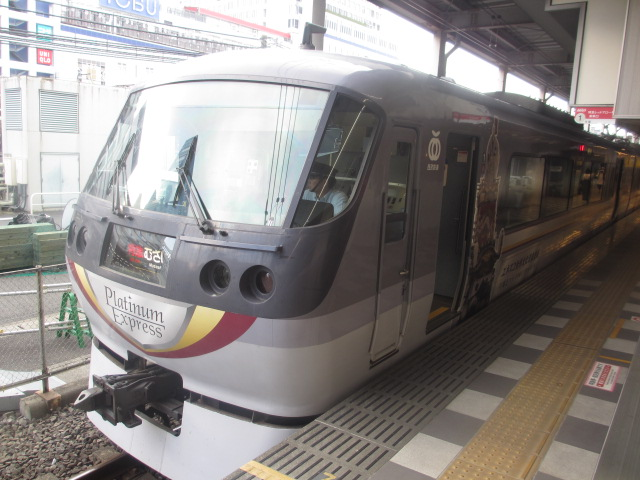
Set 10104 in Platinum Express Kawagoe Ver. livery in May 2018

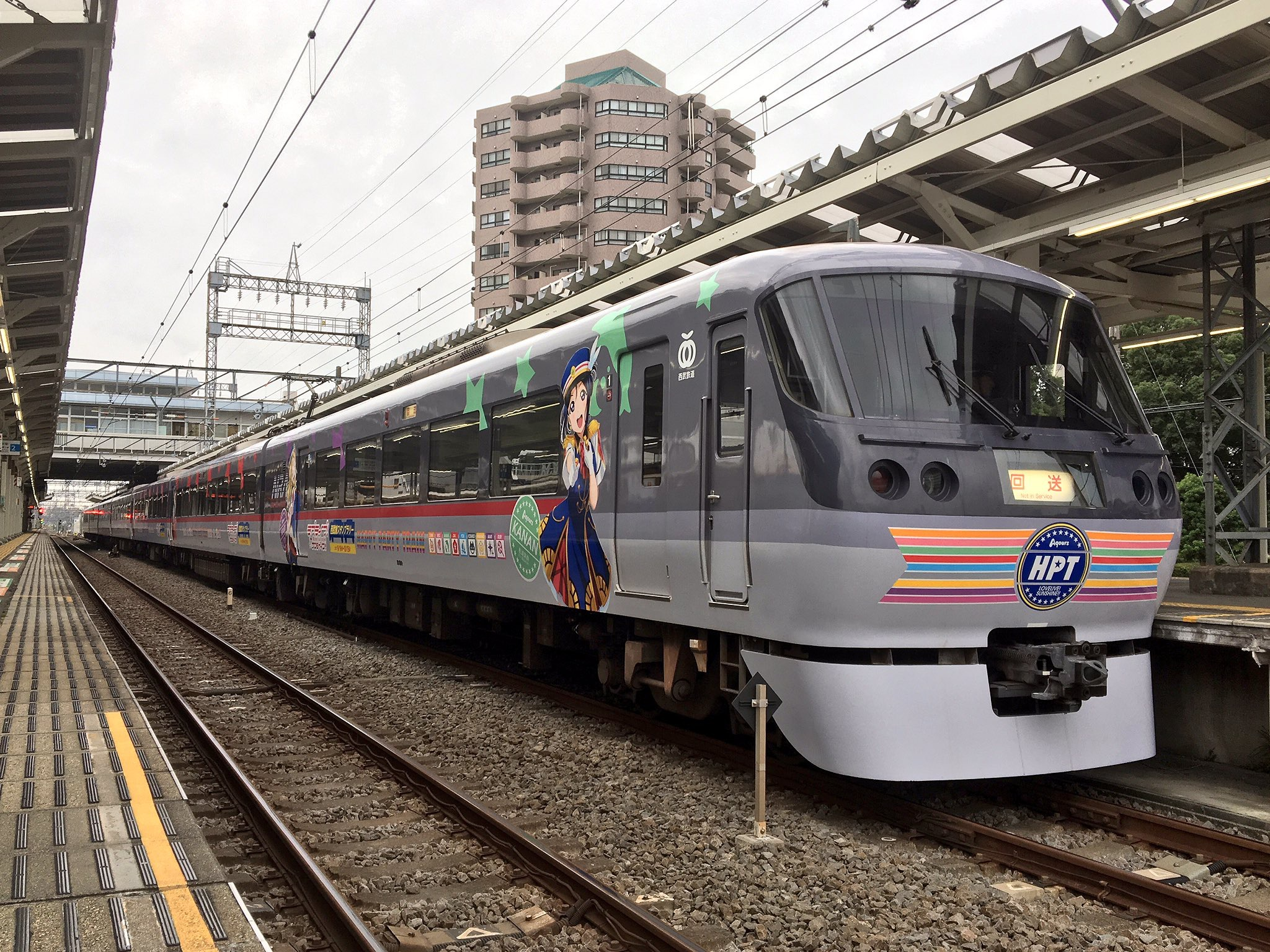
Set 10109 in Love Live! Sunshine!! livery in September 2017

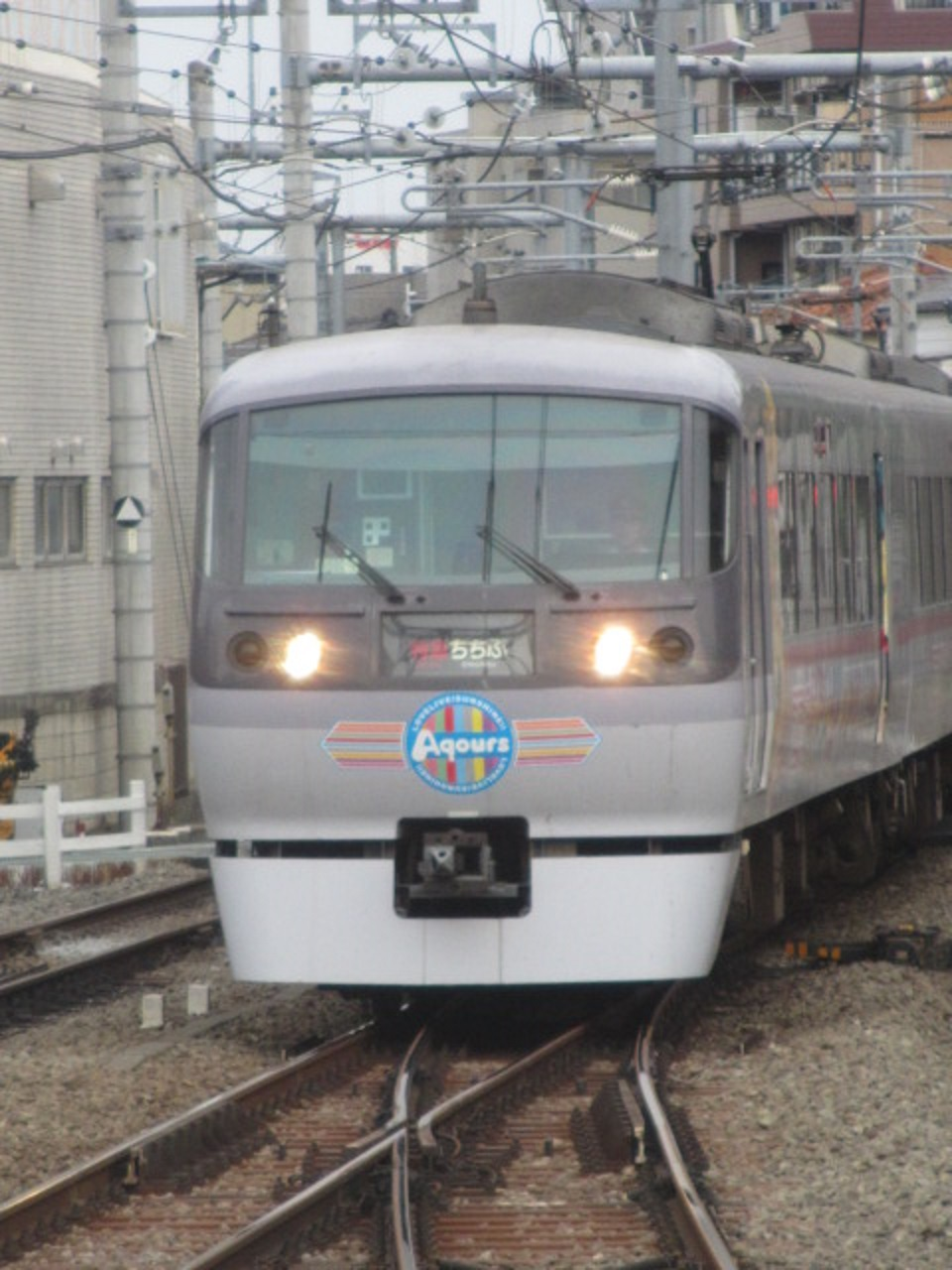
Set 10102 in Love Live! Sunshine!! livery in May 2018
