= National Rifle Association of New Zealand =

Sports governing body

- Sport: Shooting Sports
- Category: Fullbore target rifle
- Jurisdiction: New Zealand
- Abbreviation: NRA, NRANZ
- Founded: 1878
- Affiliation: New Zealand Shooting Federation, ICFRA
- Headquarters: Trentham, New Zealand
- President: M. Dodson
- Chairman: R. Mason
- Vice president: B. Carter
- Replaced: New Zealand Rifle Association

Official website
- www.nranz.com
- (New Zealand)

The National Rifle Association of New Zealand (NRA) is the national governing body for Fullbore rifle shooting in New Zealand.

The Association is the representative member for New Zealand to the International Confederation of Fullbore Rifle Associations (ICFRA) and participates in ICFRA World Championships and the Commonwealth Games.

== History ==
The NRA traces its history to the foundation of the New Zealand Rifle Association (NZRA) in 1878, taking over the running of the annual national championships from the Government Volunteer Movement which had run an annual meeting since 1861. By 1900 the NZRA was in financial difficulty owing to the expense of building a new range each year - the annual championships were contested around the country on temporary sites rather than from a fixed base. At the request of the NZRA, the Association was taken over by the Defence Force, becoming the New Zealand Defence Rifle Association. The Trentham rifle range became available in 1902, allowing for a central annual meeting. In 1923, the National Rifle Association was formed to differentiate the interests of target shooters from those of the Defence Force.

The Association is headquartered at the Seddon Range Shooting Village, adjacent to the Trentham Military Camp. The Association maintains a License to Occupy the land from the New Zealand Defence landlord.

== International Performance ==
=== ICFRA World Championships ===
As of 2019, New Zealand's highest finish in the ICFRA World Long Range Championships (the Palma Trophy match) is second, achieved in 1979. They have ranked third on five occasions.

New Zealand has hosted the ICFRA Long Range World Championships three times - in 1979, 1995 and 2019.

=== Kolapore ===
New Zealand has contested the Kolapore Match (Note: A prestigious international match held annually at Bisley during the National Rifle Association's Imperial Meeting.) at Bisley fifteen times since 1897, when they were runners up to Victoria (Australia) on their debut. New Zealand went on to win in 1904 and 1960. As of 2022, their most recent result was 7th in the 2019 match.

== See also ==
- New Zealand Shooting Federation
- International Confederation of Fullbore Rifle Associations
