= IPSC Hellenic Handgun Championship =

The IPSC Hellenic Handgun Championship is an IPSC level 3 championship held once a year by the Hellenic Shooting Federation.

== Champions ==
The following is a list of current and previous champions.

=== Overall category ===
| Year | Division | Gold | Silver | Bronze | Venue |
|---|---|---|---|---|---|
| 2016 | Open | (Greece) Papadopoulos Vasilios | (Greece) Anastasiou Ioannis | (Greece) Savellidis Charalampos | |
| 2016 | Standard | (Greece) Roumeliotakis Kostas | (Greece) Poutoglidis Giorgos | (Greece) Vergos Apostolos | |
| 2016 | Production | (Greece) Tsintogiannis Argiris | (Greece) Alleyn Brian | (Greece) Skouzos Vasilis | |
| 2016 | Classic | (Greece) Karalakis Emmanouil | (Greece) Dedes Kostas | (Greece) Zafiridis Michail | |

== See also ==
- Hellenic Rifle Championship
- Hellenic Shotgun Championship
- Hellenic Tournament Championship
