= IPSC Hellenic Tournament Championship =

The IPSC Hellenic Tournament Championship is an IPSC level 3 Tournament championship held once a year by the Hellenic Shooting Federation.

== Champions ==
The following is a list of current and previous champions.

=== Overall category ===
Year	Division	Gold	Silver	Bronze	Venue
2016	Open	(Greece) Anastasiou Ioannis	(Greece) Tsintogiannis Argiris	(Greece) Kandilis Dimitris	
2016	Standard	(Greece) Roumeliotakis Kostas	(Greece) Skouzos Vasilios	(Greece) Rammos Nikolaos	
2016	Production	(Greece) Tsiavos Georgios	(Greece) Zafiridis Michail	(Greece) Soumalevris Kostas	

== See also ==
- Hellenic Handgun Championship
- Hellenic Rifle Championship
- Hellenic Shotgun Championship
