= IPSC Hellenic Rifle Championship =

The IPSC Hellenic Tournament Championship is an IPSC level 3 championship held once a year by the Hellenic Shooting Federation.

== Champions ==
The following is a list of current and previous champions.

=== Overall category ===
Year	Division	Gold	Silver	Bronze	Venue
2012	Manual Open	(Greece) Tsintogiannis Argiris	(Greece) Anastasiou Ioannis	(Greece) Kandilis Dimitris	
2012	Manual Standard	(Greece) Zafiridis Sotirios Thomas	(Greece) Tsiavos Georgios	(Greece) Roumeliotakis Kostas	

== See also ==
- Hellenic Handgun Championship
- Hellenic Shotgun Championship
- Hellenic Tournament Championship
