= IPSC Hellenic Shotgun Championship =

Greek sport shooting competition

The IPSC Hellenic Shotgun Championship is an IPSC level 3 championship held once a year by the Hellenic Shooting Federation.

== Champions ==
The following is a list of current and previous champions.

=== Overall category ===
Year	Division	Gold	Silver	Bronze	Venue
2016	Open	(Greece) Karalakis Emmanouil	(Greece) Anastasiou Ioannis	(Greece) Ivantsos Stefanos	
2016	Modified	(Greece) Karasoulos Dimitrios	(Greece) Sismanis Athanasios	(Greece) Tsopouropoulou Eleni	
2016	Standard	(Greece) Filippou Georgios	(Greece) Tsintogiannis Argiris	(Greece) Loginov Dimitris	
2016	Standard Manual	(Greece) Kandilis Dimitrios	(Greece) Roumeliotakis Kostas	(Greece) Tsiavos Georgios	

== See also ==
- Hellenic Handgun Championship
- Hellenic Rifle Championship
- Hellenic Tournament Championship
