= IPSC Australasia Tournament Championship =

The IPSC Australasia Tournament Championship is an IPSC level 4 Tournament championship hosted in Australasia.

== Champions ==
The following is a list of current and past IPSC Australasian Tournament Champions.

=== Overall category ===
Year	Division	Gold	Silver	Bronze	Venue
2009	Open	(Philippines) Enrico Papa	(Philippines) Wilfredo Anglo	(Philippines) Leonardo Jr. Gino	Philippines
2009	Standard	(Philippines) Nelson Uygongco	(Philippines) Edward Rivera	(Philippines) Alonzo Jr Santos	Philippines

=== Lady category ===
Year	Division	Gold	Silver	Bronze	Venue
2009	Open	(Sri Lanka) Anusha Prasadika	(Philippines) Jannette Gonzaga	(Philippines) Lydia Cuyong	Philippines

=== Junior category ===
Year	Division	Gold	Silver	Bronze	Venue
2009	Open	(Sri Lanka) Haritha Pilapitiya	(Philippines) Jose Leonardo De Leon	(Philippines) Genaro IV Alvarez	Philippines

=== Senior category ===
Year	Division	Gold	Silver	Bronze	Venue
2009	Open	(Philippines) Wilfredo Anglo	(Philippines) Joey Delos Santos	(Philippines) Sonny Cu	Philippines
2009	Standard	(Philippines) Jackson Yuquimpo	(Philippines) Fernando Gonzaga	(Philippines) Gorgonio Carreon	Philippines

=== Super Senior category ===
Year	Division	Gold	Silver	Bronze	Venue
2009	Open	(Australia) Lez Carroll	(Philippines) Peter Abraham	(Philippines) Miguelito Jr Hizon	Philippines
