= IPSC Latin American Handgun Championship =

Shooting competition

The IPSC Latin American Championship are IPSC championships hosted in Latin America.

== History ==
- 2010 Buenos Aires, Argentina
- 2013 Guayaquil, Ecuador
- 2016 August 13 to 20, Barranquilla and Cartagena, Colombia
- 2019 Argentina

== Champions ==
=== Overall category ===
Year	Division	Gold	Silver	Bronze	Venue
2010	Open	(Brazil) Jaime Saldanha Jr.	(Ecuador) Nicolas Blum Gilbert	(Argentina) Daniel Minaglia	Buenos Aires, Argentina
2010	Modified	(Brazil) Augusto Ribas	(Brazil) Ildeu Heller Coelho Martins	(Brazil) Leandro Boaventura	Buenos Aires, Argentina
2010	Standard	(Argentina) Jorge Baigorria	(Argentina) Patricio Roitman	(Brazil) Nilton Antonio Fior	Buenos Aires, Argentina
2010	Production	(Argentina) Marcelo Prieto	(Argentina) Gaston Quindi Valerga	(Argentina) Juan Pablo Vuattone	Buenos Aires, Argentina
2013	Open				Guayaquil, Ecuador<
2013	Standard				Guayaquil, Ecuador<
2013	Production				Guayaquil, Ecuador<
2013	Classic				Guayaquil, Ecuador<
2013	Revolver				Guayaquil, Ecuador<
2016	Open				Barranquilla and Cartagena, Colombia
2016	Standard				Barranquilla and Cartagena, Colombia
2016	Production				Barranquilla and Cartagena, Colombia
2016	Classic				Barranquilla and Cartagena, Colombia
2016	Revolver				Barranquilla and Cartagena, Colombia

=== Lady category ===
Year	Division	Gold	Silver	Bronze	Venue
2010	Open				Buenos Aires, Argentina
2010	Modified				Buenos Aires, Argentina
2010	Standard				Buenos Aires, Argentina
2010	Production				Buenos Aires, Argentina
2013	Open				Guayaquil, Ecuador<
2013	Standard				Guayaquil, Ecuador<
2013	Production				Guayaquil, Ecuador<
2013	Classic				Guayaquil, Ecuador<
2013	Revolver				Guayaquil, Ecuador<
2016	Open				Barranquilla and Cartagena, Colombia
2016	Standard				Barranquilla and Cartagena, Colombia
2016	Production				Barranquilla and Cartagena, Colombia
2016	Classic				Barranquilla and Cartagena, Colombia
2016	Revolver				Barranquilla and Cartagena, Colombia

=== Junior category ===
Year	Division	Gold	Silver	Bronze	Venue
2010	Open				Buenos Aires, Argentina
2010	Modified				Buenos Aires, Argentina
2010	Standard				Buenos Aires, Argentina
2010	Production				Buenos Aires, Argentina
2013	Open				Guayaquil, Ecuador<
2013	Standard	Omar Cruz Sanchez			Guayaquil, Ecuador<
2013	Production				Guayaquil, Ecuador<
2013	Classic				Guayaquil, Ecuador<
2013	Revolver				Guayaquil, Ecuador<
2016	Open				Barranquilla and Cartagena, Colombia
2016	Standard				Barranquilla and Cartagena, Colombia
2016	Production				Barranquilla and Cartagena, Colombia
2016	Classic				Barranquilla and Cartagena, Colombia
2016	Revolver				Barranquilla and Cartagena, Colombia

=== Senior category ===
Year	Division	Gold	Silver	Bronze	Venue
2010	Open				Buenos Aires, Argentina
2010	Modified				Buenos Aires, Argentina
2010	Standard				Buenos Aires, Argentina
2010	Production				Buenos Aires, Argentina
2013	Open				Guayaquil, Ecuador<
2013	Standard				Guayaquil, Ecuador<
2013	Production				Guayaquil, Ecuador<
2013	Classic				Guayaquil, Ecuador<
2013	Revolver				Guayaquil, Ecuador<
2016	Open				Barranquilla and Cartagena, Colombia
2016	Standard				Barranquilla and Cartagena, Colombia
2016	Production				Barranquilla and Cartagena, Colombia
2016	Classic				Barranquilla and Cartagena, Colombia
2016	Revolver				Barranquilla and Cartagena, Colombia

=== Super Senior category ===
Year	Division	Gold	Silver	Bronze	Venue
2010	Open				Buenos Aires, Argentina
2010	Modified				Buenos Aires, Argentina
2010	Standard				Buenos Aires, Argentina
2010	Production				Buenos Aires, Argentina
2013	Open				Guayaquil, Ecuador<
2013	Standard				Guayaquil, Ecuador<
2013	Production				Guayaquil, Ecuador<
2013	Classic				Guayaquil, Ecuador<
2013	Revolver				Guayaquil, Ecuador<
2016	Open				Barranquilla and Cartagena, Colombia
2016	Standard				Barranquilla and Cartagena, Colombia
2016	Production				Barranquilla and Cartagena, Colombia
2016	Classic				Barranquilla and Cartagena, Colombia
2016	Revolver				Barranquilla and Cartagena, Colombia
