= Iroa =

Iroa or IROA may refer to:

- International Range Officers Association, part of the International Practical Shooting Confederation
- Iroa Pamoa, Papua New Guinean sprinter who competed in the men's 400 metres hurdles at the 1974 British Commonwealth Games
- Islamic Republic of Afghanistan, presidential republic that ruled Afghanistan from 2004 to 2021
