= IPSC South American Championship =

Shooting competition

The IPSC South American Championship are IPSC championships hosted in South America.

== History ==
- 1989 São Paulo, Brazil
- 1994 Buenos Aires, Argentina
- 1997 Caracas, Venezuela

== Champions ==
Ricardo Balzano (Argentino) Campeón Sudamericano (Open)

Diana Drapajlo (Argentina) Campeona Sudamericana (Open)

=== Overall category ===
Year	Division	Gold	Silver	Bronze	Venue
1989					São Paulo, Brazil
1994	Open	1			Buenos Aires, Argentina
1994	Modified				Buenos Aires, Argentina
1994	Standard				Buenos Aires, Argentina
1997	Open	1			Caracas, Venezuela
1997	Modified				Caracas, Venezuela
1997	Standard				Caracas, Venezuela
