= Scoring gauge =

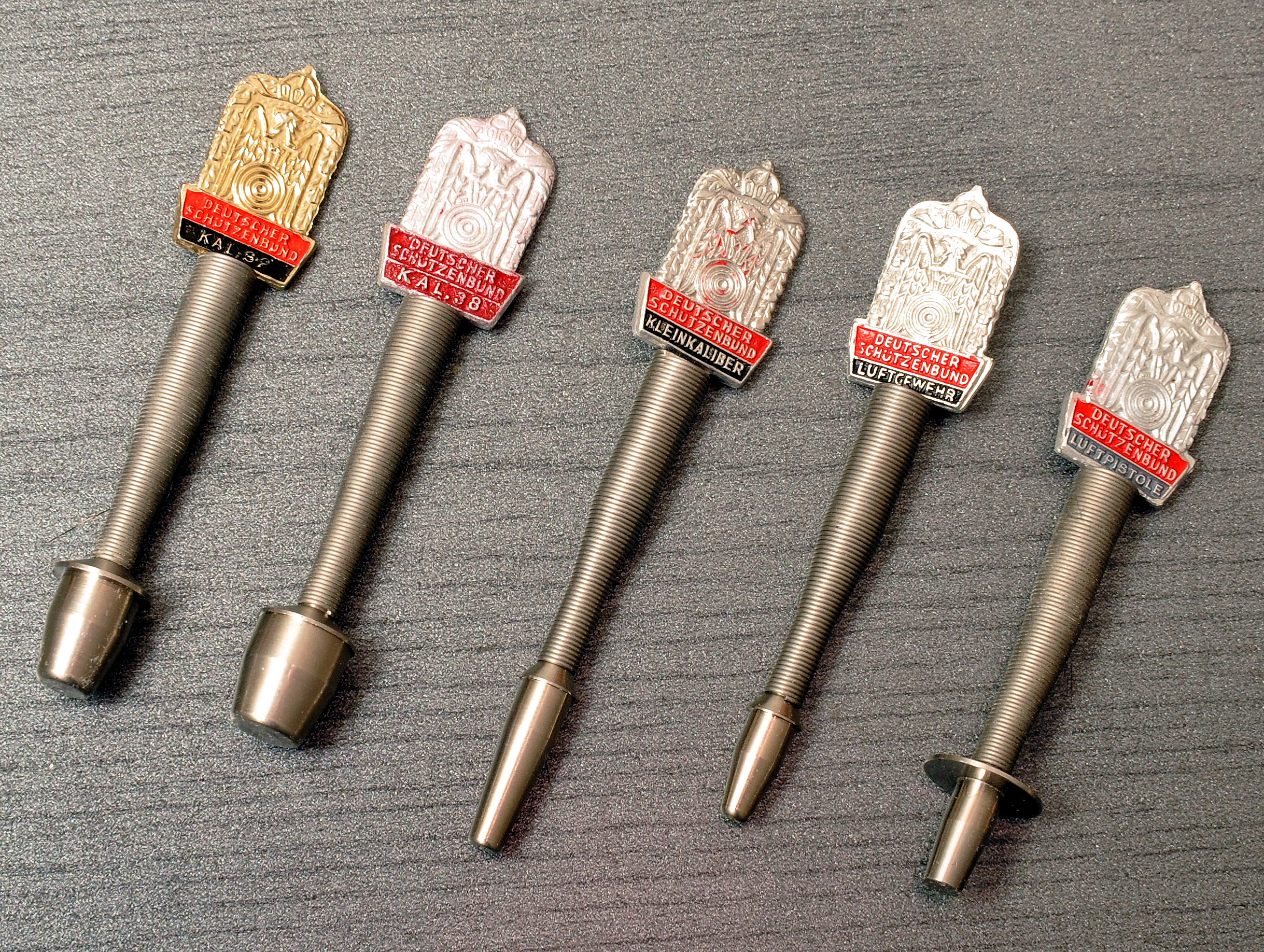
Example of manual cone shape scoring gauges used for determining score values in shooting sports.

Scoring gauges are tools used in shooting sports to determine the precise position of a bullet hole on a shooting target, and hence its scoring value. There are mainly two types of scoring gauges used for paper and cardboard targets, either the "cone shaped" tool or a transparent overlay.

The increased use of electronic targets have led to manual scoring gauges being less used. In modern olympic precision shooting competitions there is usually no manual evaluation of scoring hits any more. However, many of the same principles for manual scoring gauges discussed in this article also applies for programmed scoring gauges used in electronic targets.

== Types of scoring gauges ==
=== Manual cone gauges ===
Some competition rules state that a cone tool only can be used to gauge a bullet hole once, since the tool widens the hole.

=== Manual overlays ===
Overlay gauges can be used several times without affecting the target, making it possible for several referees to evaluate a scoring in case of doubt. Scoring overlays are amongst others used in practical shooting within the International Practical Shooting Confederation.

=== Automatic electronic target gauging ===
Electronic targets do not need physical inspection, but rather relies on a programmed gauging of the bullet hole.

== Caliber independent gauging ==
Scoring gauges can either have a fixed gauging diameter used for all bullet diameters, or have the gauging diameter vary depending on the caliber used. Caliber independent gauging is solely used on both paper and electronic targets in olympic precision events. Some sports use caliber dependent gauging for paper targets.

- Caliber dependent gauging gives a slight scoring advantage for calibers with larger bullet diameters, since the larger diameter of the bullet more easily can break scoring rings.
- Caliber independent gauging means that bullets with different diameters will be compared based on the center of their bullet holes, giving a more fair comparison of marksmanship across two cartridges where the bullet diameter is the only difference. With caliber independent gauging, two different caliber shot holes, with same distance measured from the center of their bullet holes to the center of the target, will always score the same value.

To give an example of the difference, consider using a cone shape gauge to score a .22 Long Rifle bullet hole (with the .22 LR having a bullet diameter between 5.7 and 5.73 mm), the tip of the scoring gauge might have a diameter of 5 mm and a gauge base measuring 5.6 mm in diameter. On the contrary, a scoring gauge for the 9×19mm Parabellum (9.01 mm bullet diameter) might have a spindle diameter of 9.65 mm, and is therefore slightly larger than the bullet diameter, which is also the case for most scoring gauges. Therefore, an edge hit with the .32 S&W Long (7.9 mm bullet diameter) gauged with a 9.1 mm bullet diameter scoring gauge would be gauged as almost one millimeter over the actual bullet hole, and possibly breaking a scoring ring the else wouldn't be broken.

== Method ==
The outcome of a score gauging is binary; either the bullet hole is assigned a scoring value or not. A bullet hole that doesn't touch a scoring edge does not need to be gauged, but bullet holes that touch a scoring edge often need to be gauged. These touching-an-edge situations can be classified into five scenarios:

- Being tangent to the scoring edge from the outside.
- Breaking a scoring edge from the outside.
- Breaking a scoring edge from both the outside and inside.
- Breaking a scoring edge from the inside.
- Being tangent to the scoring edge from the inside.

Whether the bullet holes in these scenarios are scored as the higher or lower value depends, according to the Civilian Marksmanship Program (CMP), on whether the target is scored "inward" or "outward".

=== Inward scoring ===
Scoring with gauges outward is done as follows in CMP:

- Higher value:
  - Outside edge is tangent with outside of the scoring ring.
  - Outside edge of gauge inside of scoring ring.
  - Outside edge of gauge outside of scoring ring.
- Lower value:
  - Outside edge of gauge lies inside of outside edge of scoring ring.

=== Outward scoring ===
Scoring with gauges inward is done as follows in CMP:

- Higher value:
  - Inside edge of gauge touches or is tangent with outside edge of scoring ring.
  - Inside edge of gauge breaks outside edge of scoring ring.
- Lower value:
  - Inside edge of gauge does not touch outside edge of scoring ring.

== See also ==
- Shot grouping
