= IPSC Venezuelan Handgun Championship =

Sport shooting competition in Venezuela

The IPSC Venezuelan Handgun Championship is an IPSC level 3 championship held once a year by the Practical Shooting Federation of Venezuela.

== Champions ==
The following is a list of previous and current champions.

=== Overall category ===
Year	Division	Gold	Silver	Bronze	Venue
1993	Open	(Venezuela) Roberto Hung	(Venezuela)	(Venezuela)	
1993	Standard	(Venezuela) Lucio Herrera Paredes	(Venezuela)	(Venezuela)	
1994	Standard	(Venezuela) Lucio Herrera Paredes	(Venezuela)	(Venezuela)	
1995	Open	(Venezuela) Francisco Vigil	(Venezuela)	(Venezuela)	
1995	Standard	(Venezuela) Lucio Herrera Paredes	(Venezuela)	(Venezuela)	
1996	Open	(Venezuela) Francisco Vigil	(Venezuela)	(Venezuela)	
1997	Open	(Venezuela) Francisco Vigil	(Venezuela)	(Venezuela)	
1997	Standard	(Venezuela) Lucio Herrera Paredes	(Venezuela)	(Venezuela)	
1998	Standard	(Venezuela) Lucio Herrera Paredes	(Venezuela)	(Venezuela)	
