= International Range Officers Association =

Organization for shooting referees

- Parent organization: International Practical Shooting Confederation

The International Range Officers Association (IROA) is a part of International Practical Shooting Confederation with the responsibility to train and certify their own dedicated range officials (referees), who are responsible for conducting matches safely, fair and according to the rules. In addition, each IPSC region have their own National Range Officers Institute (NROI) under the IROA.

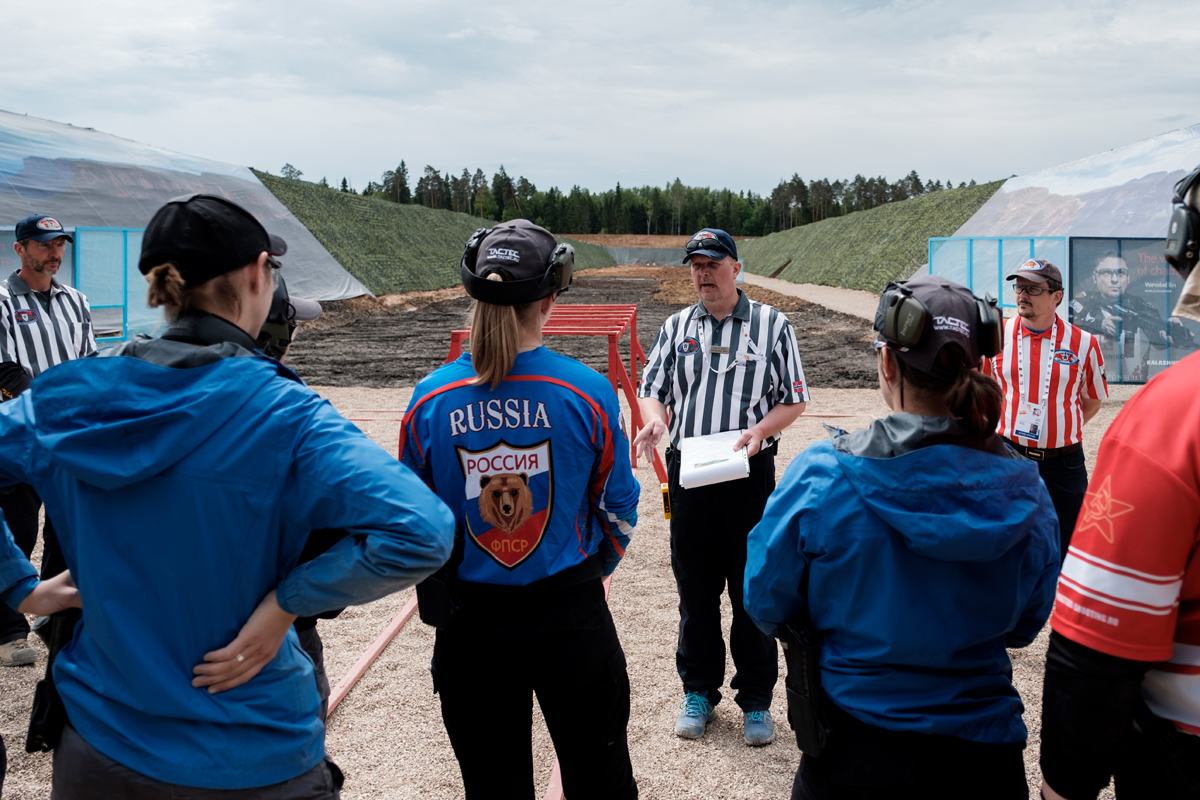
A squad of shooters get their stage brief by an IROA Range Officer on stage 11 of the 2017 IPSC Rifle World Shoot in Russia.

In matches, range officials from IROA and NROI can work alongside in the ranks:

- Range Officer (RO) - The Range Officer gives the competitors stage briefings, issue range commands and follows the competitor through the conduction of the stage to monitor time, scores and safe firearms handling.
- Chief Range Officer (CRO) - In case there are several Range Officers, a Chief Range Officer will be assigned to have the primary authority over the particular course. Like the RO, the CRO will oversee fair and consistent application of the rules.
- Range Master (RM) - The Range Master has the overall authority over the entire range during the match, including all Match Officials and the overall safety.

== See also ==
- Shot timer
- Scoring gauge
