= IPSC World Shoots =

IPSC World Shoots can refer to several events organized by the International Practical Shooting Confederation:

- IPSC Handgun World Shoots
- IPSC Rifle World Shoots
- IPSC Shotgun World Shoots
- IPSC Action Air World Shoots

== See also ==
- List of world sports championships
