= Shot timer =

Device used to measure accuracy in competitive shooting sports

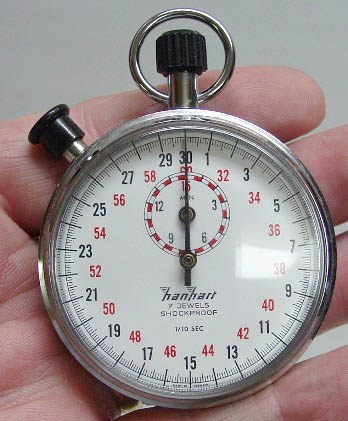
Before the introduction of shot timers, the referee had to manually stop a stopwatch when the shooter was finished.

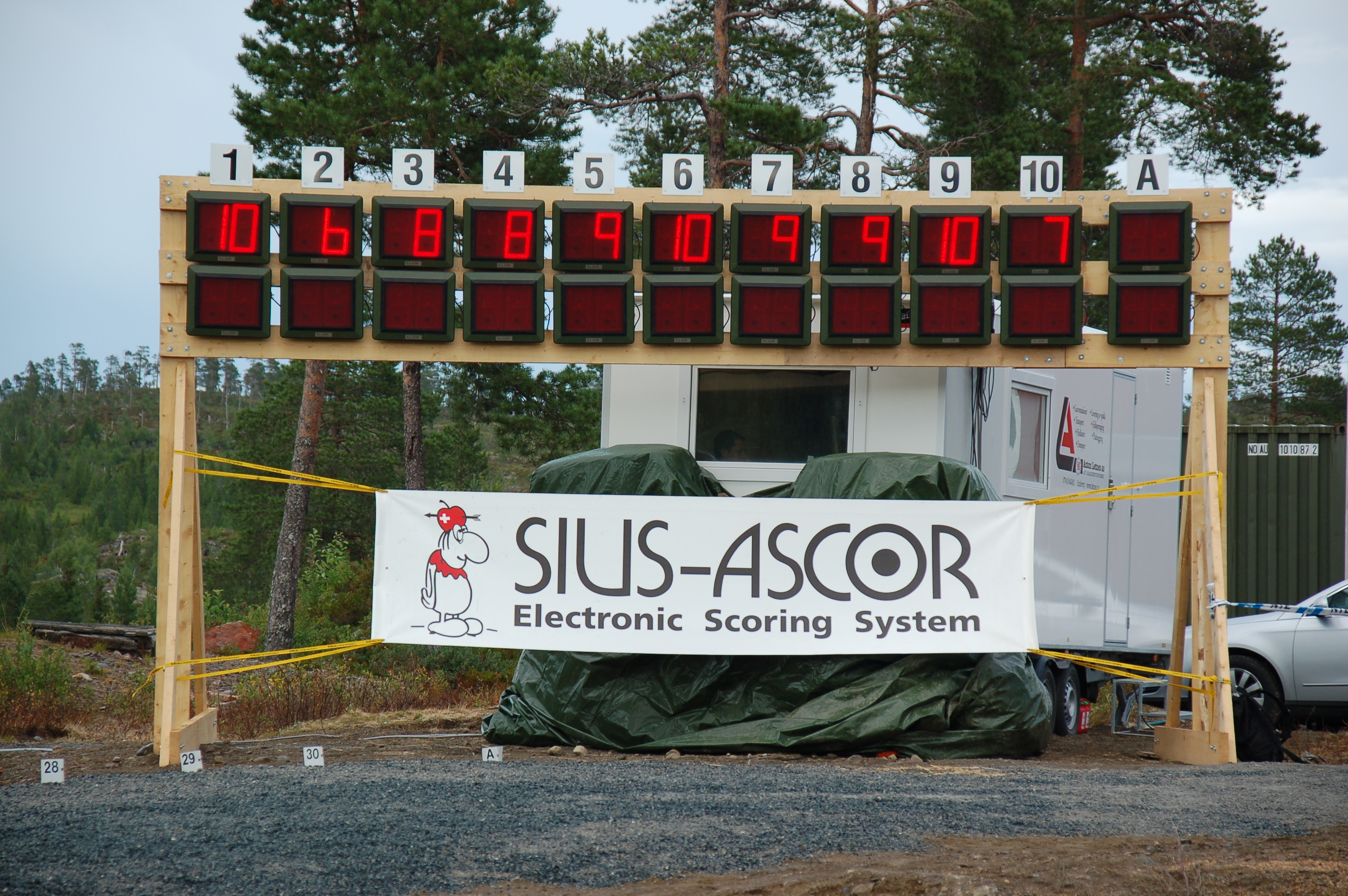
Some shot timers can be linked to big board displays to provide instant feedback to the audience.

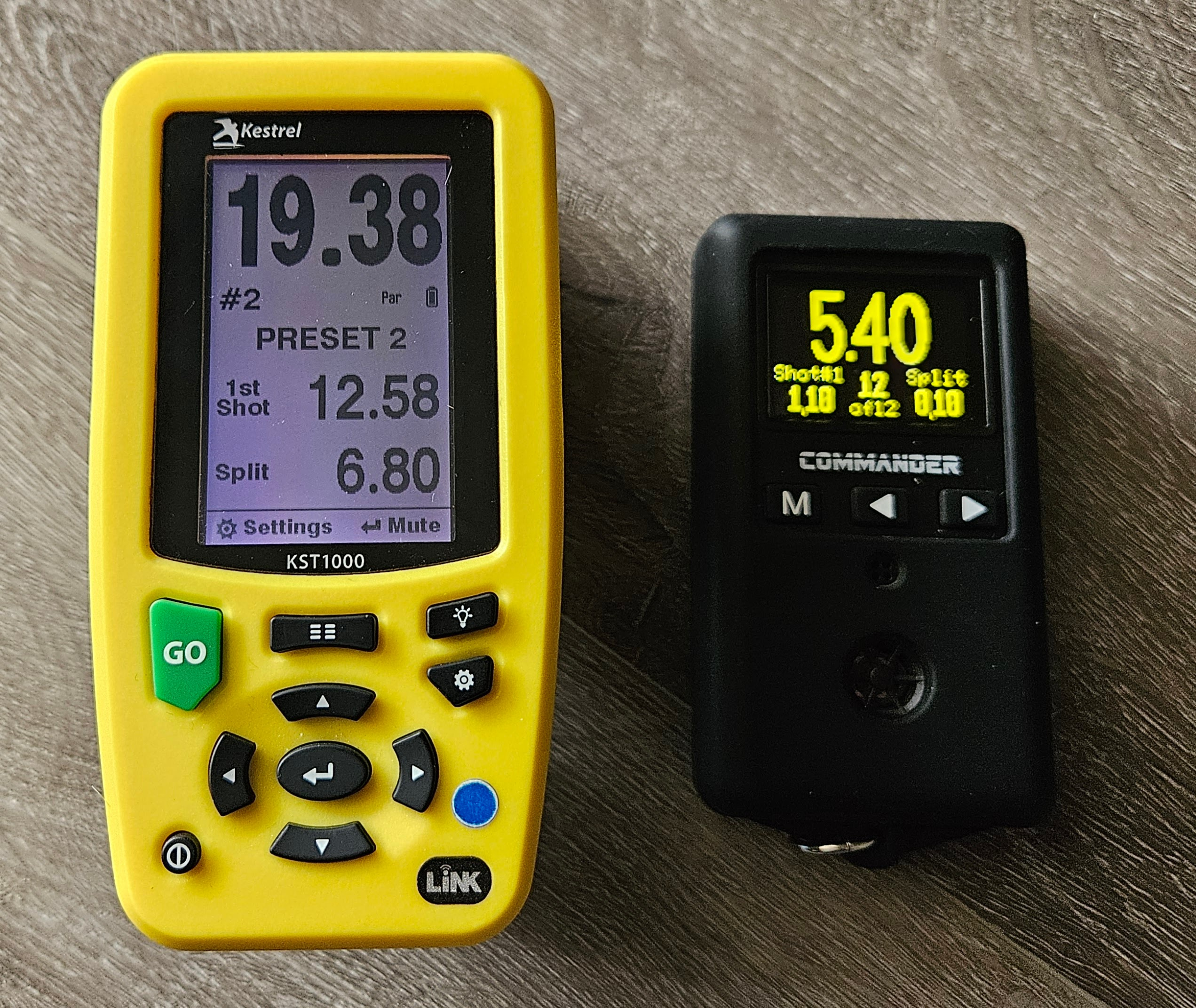
Shot timers provide additional features to serve needs of specific applications.

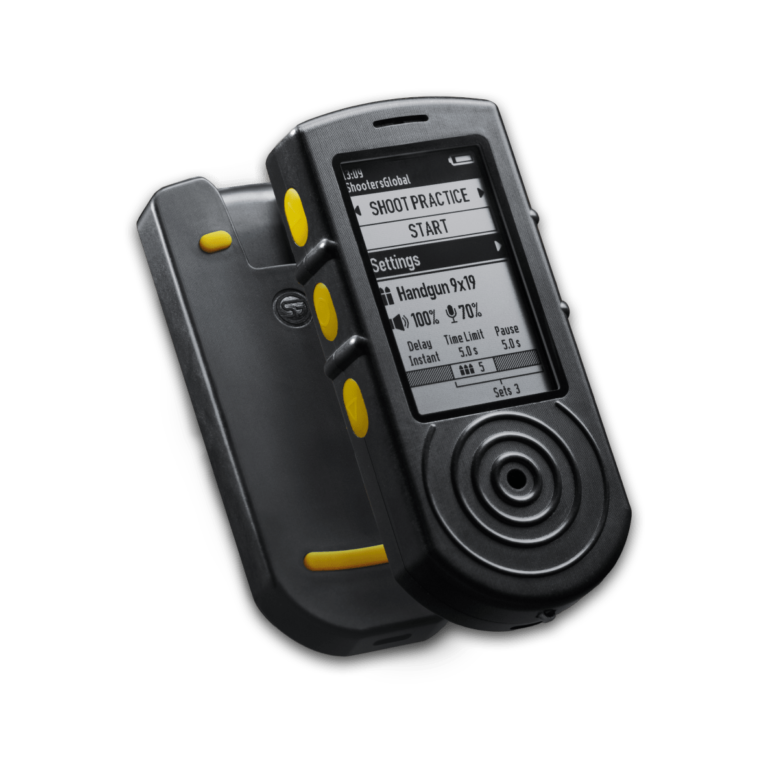
The look of one of modern shot timers.

A shot timer is a shot activated timer used in shooting sports, which starts the competitor by an audible signal and also records the competitor's time electronically by detecting the sound of each shot, together with the time from the start signal. When the competitor is finished, the timer will show the time from the start signal until the last shot. The time is usually recorded to hundredths of a second (centisecond), which is required by competitions in the International Practical Shooting Confederation.

== History ==
In 1924 Ed McGivern set a world record by firing six shots from a double-action revolver in four-fifths of a second. This time was measured with a complicated timing contraption attached to the revolver. This timing system was too complicated to be adapted in everyday shooting or shooting sports.

Shooters began using stopwatches to time shooting, often paired with a "stop plate" (a steel target engaged at the end of a shooting stage) to try to measure the total shooting timer.

In 1981, popular shooter and holster maker Bill Rodgers invented a new timing device that provided a start signal and an adjustable preset "par" end time. The goal being making all the required shots between the start and end signals of the timer.

Soon after Ron Bailey of Competition Electronics built a timer with an included microphone that was able to mark the time of each shot fired.

In 1982, Ronin Colman created the PACT Championship Timer. Throughout the next two decades, shooters would transition from the stopwatches to shot timers and a new market was created.

Outside of competitive shooting, the adaptation and use of a shot timer are still relatively low. A study conducted in 2019 showed 82% of shooters surveyed do not use a shot timer at all, and 14.5% did not know what a shot timer was.

== Types of sensors ==
=== Microphone ===
Since the introduction of shot timers with microphones in the 1980s, this has been the most common method of detecting shots until today. The timer then usually has one or more microphones and is usually carried by a referee or official, or attached to the shooter's belt. Many timers have the option to adjust their audio pickup sensitivity. Loud firearms like large caliber rifles usually trigger the timer anyway, while less powerful firearms such as small caliber 5.6×15mmR (.22 LR) rifles often require the microphone to be adjusted to a more sensitive setting. If the pickup is set too sensitive there is a risk of detecting shots from other than the shooter intended to being measured or even speech.

=== Accelerometer ===
There are also shot timers that attach to the firearm and detect shots using accelerometers and gyroscopes instead of using a separate hand-held device with microphones. These can also be used for data analysis of general movement of the firearm. Mantis was one of the first major manufacturers of such systems when they launched the MantisX system in 2015. Before that, Double Alpha Academy had launched the shot-timer watch ShotMaxx in 2013 after two years of development, which took advantage of data fusion using a built-in microphone and accelerometer to detect shots. These types of shot timers can be particularly suitable for indoor ranges where there are a lot of gun sound reflections, or on quieter firearms such as small caliber rifles.

== Bluetooth ==
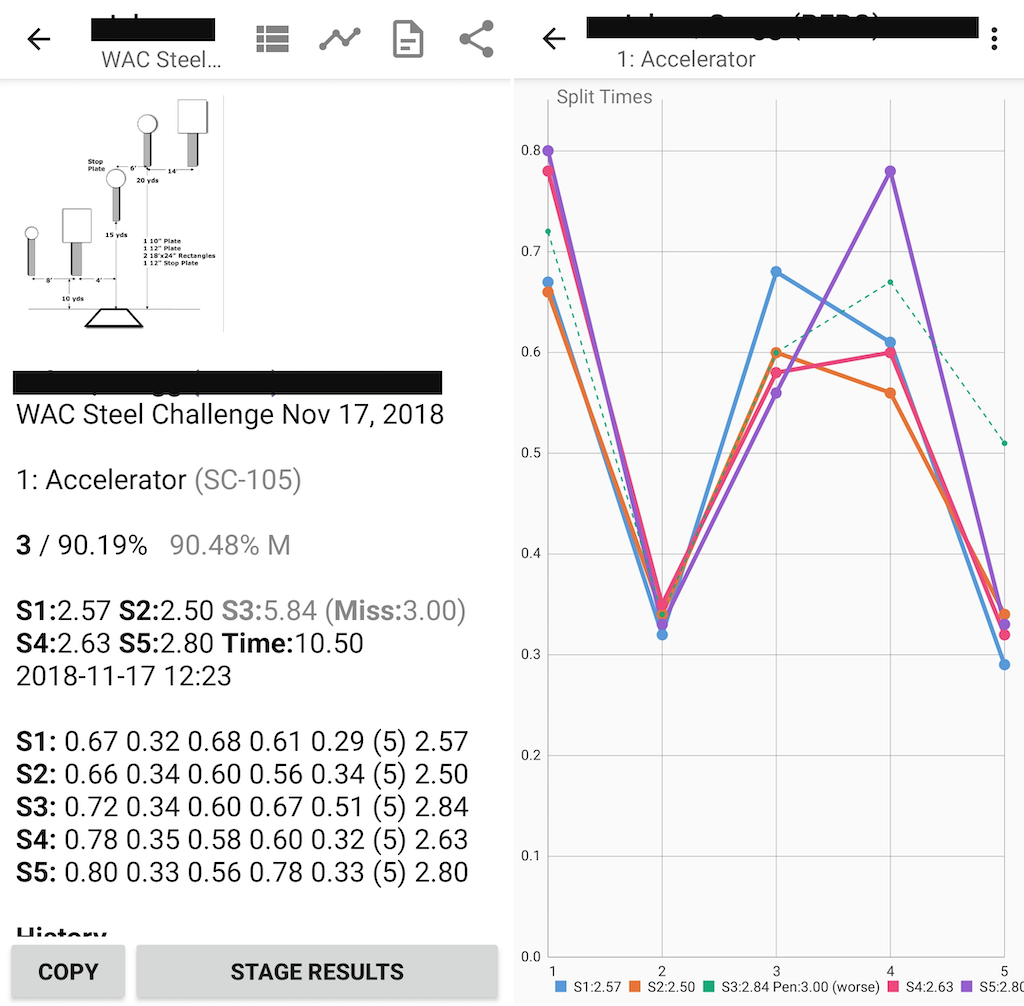
PractiScore Competitor app showing timer data recorded at the WAC Steel Challenge match on Nov 17, 2018

Modern shot timers with Bluetooth interface enable communication with mobile applications, allowing recording of detailed shooting data during competitions and practice sessions. Unlike traditional shot timers, which are generally used to record only the final time, Bluetooth-enabled timers can automatically log the time of each individual shot.

One of the earliest attempts to integrate Bluetooth functionality was the ShotMaxx timer by Double Alpha Academy in 2013, which transmitted data via a Bluetooth audio link. However, the connection proved unreliable, and the feature was subsequently removed in later firmware updates.

A major leap forward occurred in 2018 through a collaboration between AMG Lab and PractiScore, which brought Bluetooth-enabled shot timers into mainstream use. This innovation marked a turning point for competitive shooting sports and enabled real-time synchronization of shot-by-shot data with mobile scoring and analytics platforms. The first official deployment of this technology at a national-level event was during a Steel Challenge match in November 2018. For the first time, competitors could review detailed shot splits, stage timing, and performance trends directly through the PractiScore Competitor app. Since then, this feature has been widely adopted at shooting competitions around the world.

Following this innovation, several other manufacturers have incorporated Bluetooth support into their shot timer devices.

== Common features and functions ==
Some timers come with additional functions:

- Raw Time: The overall time recorded up to the last shot.
- Total Time: Raw time plus any additional penalty time from missed targets.
- Par times: The timer first gives a start, then a stop signal after a pre-programmed time.
- Split Time: The interval between consecutive shots.
- Instant or delayed start signal: The start signal can either come instantly by the push of the start button, or by a delay of a programmed number of seconds or within a range of seconds.
- Big board display: The possibility for direct connection to a big board display for instant audience feedback.
- Integration with an application on a mobile device such as RangeTech, PractiScore, PractiScore Log or Drills via Bluetooth.
- The possibility for scoring points on target in addition to the time, with automatic hit factor calculation, making for a complete scoring solution. The results can be loaded to a computer, i.e. by Bluetooth or RF.
- Memory storage of previous runs
- Auxiliary jack for external loud horn, visual starts or target turning
- Adjustable shot detector sensitivity
- Audible preparatory commands: An audible command to prep the shooter for the start signal. Often the words "Shooter Ready, Standby."

== Mobile app shot timers ==
A number of shot timer apps can also be downloaded for smartphones, although they are generally less reliable than dedicated standalone units. Traditional mobile phones and tablets lack the necessary style and quality of microphone to pick up gunshots; especially in a gun range where there are multiple shooters or at an indoor gun range where the sound is greater and the echo can also create a false positive on the timer.

However, many shooters use a mobile app-based shot timer only for its par function when conducting dry fire practice in which there is no need to pick up the sound of gunfire.

Apps differ mainly in whether they detect shots at all or only give start and par signals, which sensor they use, and how they are paid for. Some run on a smartwatch and detect the recoil with its accelerometer, alone or together with its microphone, so that shots fired by nearby shooters are not counted. Others can take shot times from a Bluetooth shot timer instead of the phone's microphone.

Shot timer and par timer apps (store listings as of October 2026)
App	Developer	Platforms	Detects shots	Detection method	Pricing
IPSC Shot Timer	Stoliarov Ivan	Android	Yes	Microphone	Free, ad-supported
Par Timer Pro	Luke Pighetti	Android, iOS	No (par timer only)	—N/a	Free download; subscription or one-time purchase
PlinkPal Shot Timer & Dry Fire	PlinkPal	Android, iOS, watchOS, Wear OS	Yes	Microphone and phone accelerometer; smartwatch recoil sensing	Free download, Premium subscription
Range Buddy – Shooting Drills	Practical Defense Training (iOS), Atriarch Targets (Android)	Android, iOS	Yes	Microphone or Bluetooth shot timer	Free download, Pro subscription
Recoil Shot Timer	NiftyBytes	watchOS (with iOS)	Yes	Watch accelerometer (recoil)	Free download; subscription or one-time purchase
Shot Timer – Measure & Improve	Miguel Quinonero Lopez	Android, iOS	Yes	Microphone	Free, ad-supported; paid ad removal
Shot Timer – Range Trainer	Daniel Yaakob	iOS	Yes	Microphone	Free download, Premium in-app purchase
ShootOnTime: Par Timer	LiberApps	iOS	No (par timer only)	—N/a	Free
Shotbud	Shotbud LLC	watchOS (with iOS)	Yes	Watch microphone and accelerometer	Free
Simple Shot Timer	Tareq Jami	Android, iOS	Yes	Microphone	Free, open source (GPL-3.0)

== See also ==
- Gun chronograph
