= Cliff Walsh =

American competitive revolver shooter

Personal information
- National team: American
- Occupation: Airport driver
Medal record
IPSC
Representing United States
IPSC Handgun World Shoot
Gold medal – first place	2005 Guayaquil	Revolver Team
Gold medal – first place	2011 Rhodes	Revolver Team
IPSC US Handgun Championship
Bronze medal – third place	2009	Revolver
Bronze medal – third place	2013 Frostproof	Revolver
- Updated on 20 November 2015

Cliff Walsh is a competitive shooter, ICORE World Revolver Champion and USPSA National Revolver Champion. He is also known for competing in the third season of History Channel's marksmen competition Top Shot.

== Biography ==
He began shooting competitively in 2003, and became a member of the U.S. National IPSC Revolver team which won the 2005 IPSC Handgun World Shoot in Ecuador. He finished third at the 2006 Summer Blast competition. The next year, he finished second. Finally, in 2008, Walsh finished in first place after beating Mike Carmoney by more than 53 match points.

In 2009, Walsh beat Jerry Miculek for first place in the 2009 USPSA Nationals. This was the first time Miculek was beat at the Revolver Division. Walsh is also the fourth person to receive the USPSA revolver Grand Master classification.

Walsh has competed in IPSC competitions in Ecuador, Brazil, Norway, Czech Republic and Serbia. He was also selected for the U.S. National Team for the 2011 IPSC Handgun World Shoot in Greece.

In 2011, Walsh appeared in the third season of History Channel's marksmen competition Top Shot. During the first half of the competition, Walsh competed as part of the Red Team. His team ended up winning three challenges during his tenure, and Cliff was nominated for elimination three times. He was eliminated during the eighth week of the competition in a competition with a bow.
