= USPSA Handgun Championship =

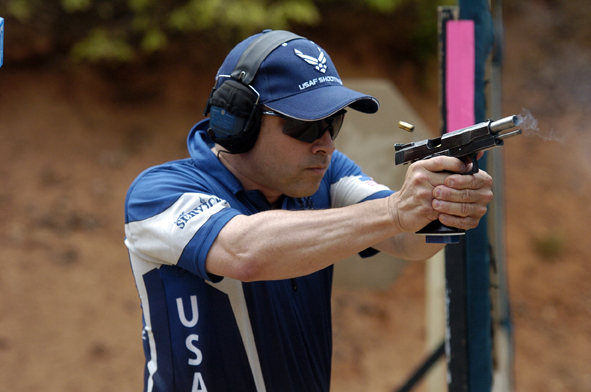
A Limited division competitor at the 2010 USPSA Area 6 championship in Covington, Georgia.

The USPSA Handgun Championships are yearly championships held by the United States Practical Shooting Association (USPSA) run under USPSA-rules (contrary to the IPSC US Handgun Championship). Sometimes, all of the pistol nationals are held at the same time, other years, they have been broken up between different ranges. In order to attend one of the pistol nationals, a competitor usually has to win a "slot", usually by placing well enough at various regional and Area Championship matches held throughout the year.

== Champions ==
The following is a list of current and previous champions.

=== Overall category ===
Year	Division	Gold	Silver	Bronze	Venue
1992	Limited	(United States) Ted Bonnet	(United States) Tommy Campbell	(United States) Ken Tapp	
1992	Revolver	(United States) Jerry Miculek	(United States) Vic Maehren	(United States) Koji Masukura	
1993	Limited	(United States) Jerry Barnhart	(United States) Rob Leatham	(United States) Merle Edington	
1994	Limited	(United States) Rob Leatham	(United States) Arnt Myhre	(United States) Todd Jarrett	
1995	Limited	(United States) Jerry Barnhart	(United States) Rob Leatham	(United States) Todd Jarrett	
1996	Limited	(United States) Jerry Barnhart	(United States) Todd Jarrett	(United States) Michael Voigt	
1997	Limited	(United States) Todd Jarrett	(United States)	(United States)	
1998	Limited	(United States) Rob Leatham	(United States)	(United States)	
1998	Limited-10	(United States) Jerry Miculek	(United States)	(United States)	
1999	Limited	(United States) Jerry Barnhart	(United States)	(United States)	
1999	Limited-10	(United States) Jerry Miculek	(United States)	(United States)	
2000	Open	(United States) Todd Jarrett	(United States)	(United States)	
2000	Limited	(United States) Rob Leatham	(United States)	(United States)	
2000	Limited-10	(United States) Ron Avery	(United States)	(United States)	
2000	Production	(United States) Ernest Langdon	(United States)	(United States)	
2001	Open	(United States) Jerry Barnhart	(United States)	(United States)	
2001	Limited	(United States) Rob Leatham	(United States)	(United States)	
2001	Limited-10	(United States) Tom Campbell	(United States)	(United States)	
2001	Production	(United States) Dave Sevigny	(United States)	(United States)	
2002	Open	(United States) Todd Jarrett	(United States)	(United States)	
2002	Limited	(United States) Rob Leatham	(United States)	(United States)	
2002	Limited-10	(United States) Rob Leatham	(United States)	(United States)	
2002	Production	(United States) Todd Jarrett	(United States)	(United States)	
2002	Revolver	(United States) Jerry Miculek	(United States)	(United States)	
2003	Open	(United States) Todd Jarrett	(United States) Max Michel	(United States) Jojo Vidanes	
2003	Standard	(United States) Robert Leatham	(United States) Phil Strader	(United States) Taran Butler	
2003	Limited	(United States) Rob Leatham	(United States)	(United States)	
2003	Limited-10	(United States) Todd Jarrett	(United States)	(United States)	
2003	Production	(United States) Dave Sevigny	(United States)	(United States)	
2003	Revolver	(United States) Jerry Miculek	(United States)	(United States)	
2004	Open	(United States) Max Michel	(United States)	(United States)	
2004	Limited	(United States) Rob Leatham	(United States)	(United States)	
2004	Limited-10	(United States) Steve Broom	(United States)	(United States)	
2004	Production	(United States) Dave Sevigny	(United States)	(United States)	
2004	Revolver	(United States) Jerry Miculek	(United States)	(United States)	
2005	Open	(United States) Max Michel	(United States) Simon Racaza	(United States) Chris Tilley	
2005	Standard	(United States) Robert Leatham	(United States) Emanuel Bragg	(United States) Blake Miguez	
2005	Limited	(United States) Rob Leatham	(United States)	(United States)	
2005	Limited-10	(United States) Dave Sevigny	(United States)	(United States)	
2005	Production	(United States) Dave Sevigny	(United States) Angus Hobdell	(United States) Matthew Mink	
2005	Revolver	(United States) Jerry Miculek	(United States) Cliff Walsh	(United States) Dan Carden	
2006	Open	(United States) Chris Tilley	(United States) Max Michel	(United States) Simon Racaza	
2006	Limited	(United States) Dave Sevigny	(United States) Chris Tilley	(United States)	
2006	Limited-10	(United States) Max Michel	(United States)	(United States)	
2006	Single Stack	(United States) Rob Leatham	(United States)	(United States)	
2006	Production	(United States) Rob Leatham	(United States) Angus Hobdell	(United States) Dave Sevigny	
2006	Revolver	(United States) Jerry Miculek	(United States)	(United States)	
2007	Open	(United States) Max Michel	(United States)	(United States) Chris Tilley	
2007	Limited	(United States) Rob Leatham	(United States) Travis Tomasie	(United States) Chris Tilley	
2007	Limited-10	(United States) Rob Leatham	(United States)	(United States)	
2007	Single Stack	(United States) Rob Leatham	(United States)	(United States)	
2007	Production	(United States) Dave Sevigny	(United States)	(United States)	
2007	Revolver	(United States) Jerry Miculek	(United States)	(United States)	
2008	Open	(United States) Chris Tilley	(United States)	(United States)	
2008	Limited	(United States) Travis Tomasie	(United States)	(United States)	
2008	Limited-10	(United States) Dave Sevigny	(United States)	(United States)	
2008	Single Stack	(United States) Rob Leatham	(United States)	(United States)	
2008	Production	(United States) Robert Vogel	(United States)	(United States)	
2008	Revolver	(United States) Jerry Miculek	(United States)	(United States)	
2009	Open	(United States) Max Michel	(United States)	(United States)	
2009	Limited	(United States) Ted Puente	(United States)	(United States)	
2009	Limited-10	(United States) Dave Sevigny	(United States)	(United States)	
2009	Single Stack	(United States) Rob Leatham	(United States)	(United States)	
2009	Production	(United States) Robert Vogel	(United States)	(United States)	
2009	Revolver	(United States) Cliff Walsh	(United States)	(United States)	
2010	Open	(United States) KC Eusebio	(United States)	(United States)	
2010	Limited	(United States) Nils Jonasson	(United States)	(United States)	
2010	Limited-10	(United States) Travis Tomasie	(United States)	(United States)	
2010	Single Stack	(United States) Rob Leatham	(United States)	(United States)	
2010	Production	(United States) Dave Sevigny	(United States)	(United States)	
2010	Revolver	(United States) Jerry Miculek	(United States)	(United States)	
2011	Open	(United States) Max Michel	(United States)	(United States)	
2011	Limited	(United States) Shannon Smith	(United States)	(United States)	
2011	Limited-10	(United States) Robert Vogel	(United States)	(United States)	
2011	Single Stack	(United States) Dave Sevigny	(United States)	(United States)	
2011	Production	(United States) Ben Stoeger	(United States)	(United States)	
2011	Revolver	(United States) Jerry Miculek	(United States)	(United States)	
2012	Open	(United States) Shane Coley	(United States)	(United States)	
2012	Limited	(United States) Blake Miguez	(United States)	(United States)	
2012	Limited-10	(United States) Robert Vogel	(United States)	(United States)	
2012	Single Stack	(United States) Nils Jonasson	(United States)	(United States)	
2012	Production	(United States) Ben Stoeger	(United States)	(United States)	
2012	Revolver	(United States) Jerry Miculek	(United States)	(United States)	
2013	Open	(United States) Max Michel	(United States)	(United States)	
2013	Limited	(United States) Nils Jonasson	(United States)	(United States)	
2013	Limited-10	(United States) Nils Jonasson	(United States)	(United States)	
2013	Single Stack	(United States) Rob Leatham	(United States)	(United States)	
2013	Production	(United States) Ben Stoeger	(United States)	(United States)	
2013	Revolver	(United States) Jerry Miculek	(United States)	(United States)	
2014	Open	(United States) Max Michel	(United States) Chris Tilley	(United States)	
2014	Limited	(United States) Nils Jonasson	(United States)	(United States)	
2014	Limited-10	(United States) Todd Jarrett	(United States)	(United States)	
2014	Single Stack	(United States) Nils Jonasson	(United States)	(United States)	
2014	Production	(United States) Ben Stoeger	(United States)	(United States)	
2014	Revolver	(United States) Rob Leatham	(United States)	(United States)	
2015	Open	(United States) Chris Tilley	(United States)	(United States)	
2015	Limited	(United States) David Sevigny	(United States)	(United States)	
2015	Limited-10	(United States) Nils Jonasson	(United States)	(United States)	
2015	Single Stack	(United States) Phil Strader	(United States)	(United States)	
2015	Production	(United States) Ben Stoeger	(United States)	(United States)	
2015	Revolver	(United States) David Olhasso	(United States)	(United States)	
2016	Open	(United States) Chris Tilley	(United States) William Drummond	(United States) Lesgar Murdock	Frostproof, Florida, 6–8 October 2016
2016	Carry Optics	(United States) Max Michel	(United States) Shane Coley	(United States) Nils Jonasson	PASA Park, Barry, Illinois, 14 August 2016
2016	Limited	(United States) Nils Jonasson	(United States) Bob Vogel	(United States) Dave Sevigny	Frostproof, Florida, 2–4 October 2016
2016	Limited 10	(United States) Dave Sevigny	(United States) Rob Leatham	(United States) Shane Coley	Frostproof, Florida, 6–8 October 2016
2016	Production	(United States) Alex Gutt	(United States) Shane Coley	(United States) Ben Stoeger	PASA Park, Barry, Illinois, 9–13 August 2016
2016	Single Stack	(United States) Nils Jonasson	(United States) Phil Strader	(United States) Rob Leatham	PASA Park, Barry, Illinois, 3–6 May 2016
2016	Revolver	(United States) Rob Leatham	(United States) James M	(United States) David O	PASA Park, Barry, Illinois, 7 May 2016
2017	Open	(United States) Cody Baker	(United States) Chris Tilley	(United States) Lesgar Murdock	Frostproof, Florida, 23–26 March 2017
2017	Limited	(United States) Shane Coley	(United States) Nils Jonasson	(United States) Bob Vogel	
2017	Limited 10	(United States) Elias Frangoulis	(United States) Rob Leatham	(United States) Michael Seeklander	
2017	Production	(United States) Ben Stoeger	(United States) Alex Gutt	(United States) Mason Lane	
2017	Revolver	(United States) Michael Poggie	(United States) Rich Wolfe	(United States) James McGinty	
2017	Single Stack	(United States) Jacob Hetherington	(United States) Nils Jonasson	(United States) Robert Krogh	
2017	Carry Optics	(United States) Max Michel	(United States) Hwansik Kim	(United States) Shane Coley	
2017	PCC	(United States) Max Leogranndis	(United States) Taran Butler	(United States) Todd Jarrett	
2018	Open	(United States) Simon Racaza	(United States) KC Eusebio	(United States) Christian Sailer	
2018	Limited	(United States) Simon Racaza	(United States) Nils Jonasson	(United States) Ben Stoeger	
2018	Limited 10	(United States) Casey Reed	(United States) Elias Frangoulis	(United States) Mark Hillegas	
2018	Production	(United States) Ben Stoeger	(United States) Simon Racaza	(United States) Jacob Hetherington	
2018	Revolver	(United States) Michael Poggie	(United States) Rich Wolfe	(United States) Josh Lentz	
2018	Single Stack	(United States) Nils Jonasson	(United States) Elias Frangoulis	(United States) Rob Leatham	
2018	Carry Optics	(United States) Max Michel	(United States) Hwansik Kim	(United States) Phil Strader	
2018	PCC	(United States) Max Leograndis	(United States) Josh Froelich	(United States) Todd Jarrett	
2019	Open	(United States) Christian Sailer	(United States) Simon Racaza	(United States) KC Eusebio	
2019	Limited	(United States) Simon Racaza	(United States) Ben Stoeger	(United States) Bob Vogel	
2019	Limited 10	(United States) Shane Coley	(United States) Casey Reed	(United States) Blake Miguez	
2019	Production	(United States) Ben Stoeger	(United States) Nils Jonasson	(United States) Jacob Hetherington	
2019	Revolver	(United States) Michael Poggie	(United States) Rich Wolfe	(United States) Josh Lentz	
2019	Single Stack	(United States) Nils Jonasson	(United States) Elias Frangoulis	(United States) Blake Miguez	
2019	Carry Optics	(United States) Max Michel	(United States) KC Eusebio	(United States) Nils Jonasson	
2019	PCC	(United States) Max Leograndis	(United States) Josh Froelich	(United States) Tim Yackley	
2020	Open	(United States) Christian Sailer	(United States) Simon Racaza	(United States) KC Eusebio	
2020	Limited	(United States) Mason Lane	(United States) John Browning	(United States) Shane Coley	
2020	Limited 10	(United States) Blake Miguez	(United States) Rob Leatham	(United States) Jeff Cawthon	
2020	Production	(United States) Jacob Hetherington	(United States) Mason Lane	(United States) Sal Luna	
2020	Revolver	(United States) Michael Poggie	(United States) Josh Lentz	(United States) Caleb Higby	
2020	Single Stack	(United States) Rob Leatham	(United States) Michael Seeklander	(United States) Jeff Cawthon	
2020	Carry Optics	(United States) Max Michel	(United States) Jason Bradley	(United States) Hwansik Kim	
2020	PCC	(United States) Max Leograndis	(United States) Josh Froelich	(United States) Zack Smith	
2021	Open	(United States) Christian Sailer	(United States) Simon Racaza	(United States) KC Eusebio	CMP Talladega Marksmanship Park, Talladega, Alabama, October 20–24, 2021
2021	Limited	(United States) Mason Lane	(United States) Nils Jonasson	(United States) Shane Coley	CMP Talladega Marksmanship Park, Talladega, Alabama, October 20–24, 2021
2021	Limited 10	(United States) Christian Sailer	(United States) Gianni Giordano	(United States) Casey Reed	
2021	Production	(United States) Nils Jonasson	(United States) Simon Racaza	(United States) Mason Lane	
2021	Revolver	(United States) Michael Poggie	(United States) Caleb Higby	(United States) Rich Wolfe	
2021	Single Stack	(United States) Rob Leatham	(United States) Elias Frangoulis	(United States) Michael Seeklander	
2021	Carry Optics	(United States) Simon Racaza	(United States) Dazhi Zhang	(United States) John Vlieger	CMP Talladega Marksmanship Park, Talladega, Alabama, October 14–18, 2021
2021	PCC	(United States) Max Leograndis	(United States) Scott Greene	(United States) Zack Smith	CMP Talladega Marksmanship Park, Talladega, Alabama, October 14–18, 2021
2022	Open	(United States) Aaron Eddins	(United States) Simon Racaza	(United States) Christian Sailer	
2022	Limited	(United States) Nils Jonasson	(United States) Scott Brown	(United States) Mason Lane	
2022	Limited 10	(United States) Mason Lane	(United States) Gorka Ibañez	(United States) Todd Jarrett	
2022	Production	(United States) Nils Jonasson	(United States) Jacob Hetherington	(United States) Sal Luna	
2022	Revolver	(United States) Michael Poggie	(United States) Rich Wolfe	(United States) Alex Bakken	
2022	Single Stack	(United States) Nils Jonasson	(United States) Dave Sevigny	(United States) Elias Frangoulis	
2022	PCC	(United States) Max Leograndis	(United States) Justine Williams	(United States) Scott Greene	
2023	Carry Optics	(United States) Christian Sailer	(United States) Nils Jonasson	(United States) Jacob Hetherington	Cardinal Shooting Center, Marengo, OH, June 21-25, 2023
2023	L-10	(United States) Jerry Westcott	(United States) Greg Leitch	(United States) Frank Skog	Cardinal Shooting Center, Marengo, OH, October 4-8, 2023
2023	Limited	(United States) Scott Brown	(United States) Joey Sauerland	(United States) John Browning	Cardinal Shooting Center, Marengo, OH, October 4-8, 2023
2023	Limited Optics	(United States) Max Leograndis	(United States) KC Eusebio	(United States) Trace Decker	Cardinal Shooting Center, Marengo, OH, October 4-8, 2023
2023	Open	(United States) Christian Sailer	(United States) John Vlieger	(United States) Lesgar Murdock	CMP Talladega Marksmanship Park, Talladega, Alabama, September 6-10, 2023
2023	PCC	(United States) Max Leograndis	(United States) Josh Froelich	(United States) Justine Williams	CMP Talladega Marksmanship Park, Talladega, Alabama, September 6-10, 2023
2023	Production	(United States) Nils Jonasson	(United States) Simon Racaza	(United States) Brian Giovannini	Cardinal Shooting Center, Marengo, OH, October 4-8, 2023
2023	Revolver	(United States) Michael Poggie	(United States) James McGinty	(United States) Rich Wolfe	Cardinal Shooting Center, Marengo, OH, October 4-8, 2023
2023	Single Stack	(United States) Elias Frangoulis	(United States) Robert Cernigoj	(United States) John Vlieger	Cardinal Shooting Center, Marengo, OH, October 4-8, 2023

=== Lady category ===
Year	Division	Gold	Silver	Bronze	Venue
1993	Limited	(United States) Sharon Kimbrel	(United States) Lisa Munson	(United States) Shirley Hamilton	
1994	Limited	(United States) Shirley Hamilton	(United States) Sharon Edington	(United States) Lisa Munson	
1995	Limited	(United States) Sharon Edington	(United States) Lisa Munson	(United States) Shirley Hamilton	
1996	Limited	(United States) Sharon Edington	(United States) Kay Clark Miculek	(United States) Lisa Munson	
1998	Limited	(United States) Sharon Zaffiro	(United States)	(United States)	
1998	Limited-10	(United States) Kay Miculek	(United States)	(United States)	
1999	Limited	(United States) Julie Goloski	(United States)	(United States)	
1999	Limited-10	(United States) Kay Miculek	(United States)	(United States)	
2000	Open	(United States) Kay Miculek	(United States)	(United States)	
2000	Limited	(United States) Lisa Munson	(United States)	(United States)	
2001	Open	(United States) Kay Miculek	(United States)	(United States)	
2001	Limited	(United States) Lisa Munson	(United States)	(United States)	
2002	Open	(United States) Lisa Munson	(United States)	(United States)	
2002	Limited	(United States) Renee Tyson	(United States)	(United States)	
2002	Limited-10	(United States) Lisa Munson	(United States)	(United States)	
2002	Production	(United States) Angi Kelley	(United States)	(United States)	
2003	Open	(United States) Kay Miculek	(United States)	(United States)	
2003	Limited	(United States) Lisa Munson	(United States)	(United States)	
2003	Limited-10	(United States) Lisa Munson	(United States)	(United States)	
2003	Production	(United States) Angi Kelley	(United States)	(United States)	
2004	Open	(United States) Kay Miculek	(United States)	(United States)	
2004	Limited	(United States) Carina Randolph	(United States)	(United States)	
2004	Limited-10	(United States) Julie Huseby	(United States)	(United States)	
2004	Production	(United States) Julie Goloski	(United States)	(United States)	
2005	Open	(United States) Doni Spencer	(United States)	(United States)	
2005	Limited	(United States) Kay Miculek	(United States)	(United States)	
2005	Limited-10	(United States) Julie Goloski	(United States)	(United States)	
2005	Production	(United States) Julie Goloski	(United States)	(United States)	
2006	Open	(United States) Kay Miculek	(United States)	(United States)	
2006	Limited	(United States) Lisa Munson	(United States)	(United States)	
2006	Limited-10	(United States) Julie Goloski	(United States)	(United States)	
2006	Single Stack	(United States) Julie Goloski	(United States)	(United States)	
2006	Production	(United States) Julie Goloski	(United States)	(United States)	
2007	Open	(United States) Athena Lee	(United States)	(United States)	
2007	Limited	(United States) Lisa Munson	(United States)	(United States)	
2007	Limited-10	(United States) Julie Goloski	(United States)	(United States)	
2007	Single Stack	(United States) Kippi Leatham	(United States)	(United States)	
2007	Production	(United States) Jessie Abbate	(United States)	(United States)	
2008	Open	(United States) Rebecca Jones	(United States)	(United States)	
2008	Limited	(United States) Jessie Abbate	(United States)	(United States)	
2008	Limited-10	(United States) Jessie Abbate	(United States)	(United States)	
2008	Single Stack	(United States) Lisa Munson	(United States)	(United States)	
2009	Open	(United States) Catherine Megan Francisco	(United States)	(United States)	
2009	Limited	(United States) Jessie Abbate	(United States)	(United States)	
2009	Limited-10	(United States) Randi Rogers	(United States)	(United States)	
2009	Single Stack	(United States) Lisa Munson	(United States)	(United States)	
2009	Production	(United States) Jessie Abbate	(United States)	(United States)	
2010	Open	(United States) Rebecca Jones	(United States)	(United States)	
2010	Limited	(United States) Jessie Abbate	(United States)	(United States)	
2010	Limited-10	(United States) Randi Rogers	(United States)	(United States)	
2010	Single Stack	(United States) Julie Golob	(United States)	(United States)	
2010	Production	(United States) Randi Rogers	(United States)	(United States)	
2011	Open	(United States) Rebecca Jones	(United States)	(United States)	
2011	Limited	(United States) Jessie Harrison	(United States)	(United States)	
2011	Limited-10	(United States) Lisa Munson	(United States)	(United States)	
2011	Single Stack	(United States) Sara Dunivin	(United States)	(United States)	
2011	Production	(United States) Julie Golob	(United States)	(United States)	
2011	Revolver	(United States) Julie Golob	(United States)	(United States)	
2012	Open	(United States) Jessie Duff	(United States)	(United States)	
2012	Limited	(United States) Jessie Duff	(United States)	(United States)	
2012	Limited-10	(United States) Randi Rogers	(United States)	(United States)	
2012	Single Stack	(United States) Julie Golob	(United States)	(United States)	
2012	Production	(United States) Randi Rogers	(United States)	(United States)	
2012	Revolver	(United States) Annette Aysen	(United States)	(United States)	
2013	Open	(United States) Jessie Duff	(United States)	(United States)	
2013	Limited	(United States) Jessie Duff	(United States)	(United States)	
2013	Limited-10	(United States) Tori Nonaka	(United States)	(United States)	
2013	Single Stack	(United States) Jessie Duff	(United States)	(United States)	
2013	Production	(United States) Randi Rogers	(United States)	(United States)	
2013	Revolver	(United States) Annette Aysen	(United States)	(United States)	
2014	Open	(United States) Kaci Cochran	(United States)	(United States)	
2014	Limited	(United States) Jessie Duff	(United States)	(United States)	
2014	Limited-10	(United States) Debbie Keehart	(United States)	(United States)	
2014	Single Stack	(United States) Jessie Duff	(United States)	(United States)	
2014	Production	(United States) Sara Dunivin	(United States)	(United States)	
2014	Revolver	(United States) Annette Aysen	(United States)	(United States)	
2015	Open	(United States) Kaci Cochran	(United States)	(United States)	
2015	Limited	(United States) Jessie Duff	(United States)	(United States)	
2015	Limited-10	(United States) Tori Nonaka	(United States)	(United States)	
2015	Single Stack	(United States) Jessie Duff	(United States)	(United States)	
2015	Production	(United States) Randi Rogers	(United States)	(United States)	
2015	Revolver	(United States) Annette Aysen	(United States)	(United States)	

== See also ==
- USPSA Multigun Championship
- IPSC US Handgun Championship
- IPSC Handgun World Shoots
