= Tori Nonaka =

American sport shooter (born 1995)

Tori M. Nonaka
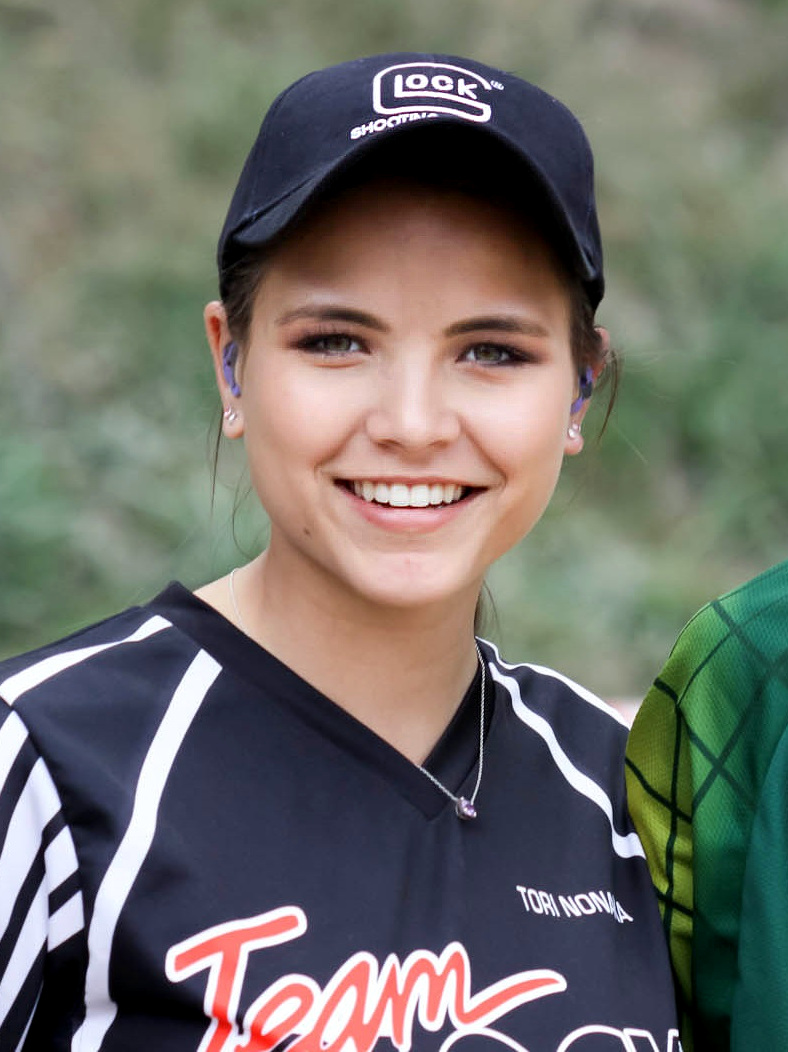
- Tori Nonaka of Team Glock at the 2013 IPSC Australasia Handgun Championship in New Zealand

Personal information
- Nationality: (United States) American
- Born: 23 March 1995 (age 31) Woodbridge, Virginia, United States
- Occupation: IPSC shooter
- Website: torinonaka.com

Sport
- Team: Team Glock (2011-2017)
Medal record
IPSC
Representing United States
IPSC Handgun World Shoot
Silver medal – second place	2011 Rhodes	Lady Standard
Silver medal – second place	2014 Frostproof	Lady Standard
IPSC US Handgun Championship
Silver medal – second place	2012 Frostproof	Junior Standard
Bronze medal – third place	2012 Frostproof	Lady Standard
Bronze medal – third place	2013 Frostproof	Lady Standard
Gold medal – first place	2015 Frostproof	Lady Standard

Tori M. Nonaka (born 23 March 1995 in Woodbridge, Virginia, United States) is an American sport shooter with two IPSC Handgun World Shoot silver medals in the Standard division Lady category (2011 and 2014). She was one of three members of Team GLOCK. She grew up in Woodbridge, Virginia, where she began shooting at age 3. At age 12, Tori attended the US Shooting Academy, which sparked her interest in becoming a professional shooter and led her to begin shooting competitively. On March 2, 2011, GLOCK, Inc announced that 15-year-old Tori would be a member of Team GLOCK Shooting Squad. In March 2017 Tori went independent and left Team Glock. She was replaced by Ashley Rheuark.

Tori is an NRA member and has competed in various disciplines, including USPSA, SSCA, IPSC, IDPA, Bianchi & GSSF. In 2010, Tori earned the titles of USPSA National Juniors Champion in Limited 10 competition, the US Steel National Super Junior, and IDPA National Junior Champion. Already in 2011, Tori has taken home the titles of USPSA Area 6 Top Production Lady and High Junior, Pro AM High Junior and High A Class in the Limited Division.

In October 2011, Tori was a member of the gold medal winning USA Ladies Standard Team at the 2011 IPSC Handgun World Shoot in Rhodes, Greece, Tori was also the silver medalist in the ladies individual competition.

In 2013 Tori won the ladies Standard division at both the IPSC Australasia Handgun Championship in Rotorua, NZ, the IPSC European Handgun Championship in Barcelos, Portugal. Tori then became the youngest person ever (age 18) to win a USPSA Handgun Nationals title when she became the 2013 USPSA Limited 10 Ladies champion.

In 2017, Tori was no longer a member of Team Glock as another accomplished female shooter, Ashley Rheuark, was added to the team.

== Ladies Titles ==
=== 2010 ===
- USPSA National Single Stack Juniors Champion
- IDPA National Juniors Champion
- USPSA National Limited-10 Juniors Champion
- USPSA National Limited-10 High C Class
- USPSA National Production High B Class IDPA East Coast Ladies Champion
- IDPA North Carolina State Ladies Champion
- IDPA North Carolina State Juniors Champion
- USPSA Virginia/Maryland Ladies Production Champion
- IDPA Virginia State Ladies Champion
- IDPA Virginia State High Expert
- US Steel National Super Junior Champion

=== 2011 ===
- IDPA Indoor Nationals Junior Champion
- USPSA Area 6 Production Division High Lady
- USPSA Virginia/Maryland Production Division High Lady
- US Steel National Rimfire Optic Ladies Champion

=== 2013 ===
- USPSA Limited 10 Nationals
- IPSC European Standard division
- IPSC Australasian Standard division
- Florida Open
- USPSA Area 6
- USPSA Ohio State
- USPSA Area 3
- USPSA Area 2
