= Julie Golob =

American sport shooter

Julie Goloski Golob
Medal record
IPSC
Representing United States
IPSC Handgun World Shoot
Silver medal – second place	2005 Guayaquil	Lady Standard
Silver medal – second place	2011 Rhodes	Lady Production
Bronze medal – third place	2014 Frostproof	Lady Production
Gold medal – first place	2017 Châteauroux	Lady Classic
IPSC US Handgun Championship
Gold medal – first place	1999	Lady Open
Gold medal – first place	2015 Frostproof	Lady Classic

Julie Goloski Golob is an American professional sport shooter with one gold (2017 Lady Classic and two silver medals (2005 Lady Standard and 2011 Lady Production), one bronze medal (2014 Lady Production) and seven Ladies Steel Challenge World Speed Shooting Championship gold medals. She also has 2 US IPSC Nationals Lady titles and 13 USPSA Handgun Nationals Lady titles, and is one of two seven Division USPSA National Champion in history.

Julie Goloski began her shooting career when she was fourteen, practicing with her father, Pete Goloski. She continued competing through high school and, in 1994, met with the coach of the Army Action Shooting Team. The coach sent her a letter of acceptance and Julie joined the United States Army. In 1999, she competed at the USPSA Nationals and ended up winning at the Limited and Open Division. That year, she was also named US Army Athlete of the Year

In 2002, Goloski left the Army to become a professional markswoman. She received a contract with Glock and started competing for them. In 2006 Julie joined Team Smith & Wesson. In 2006, Goloski won three Divisions at the USPSA Nationals (Limited-10, Single Stack, and Production), becoming the first woman to do so. More recently, she won the Production and Revolver Division at the 2011 USPSA Nationals as Julie Golob. This was the first time any shooter had won all six divisions.

In 2012, Golob appeared as an expert in the fourth season of History Channel's Top Shot.

On August 12th, 2025, Julie announced she left Smith & Wesson to join the team at Springfield Armory in Geneseo, Illinois.

Golob lives in Kansas City, Missouri with her husband and two daughters.

== Achievements ==
- 2005 IPSC Handgun World Shoot Lady Standard Silver
- 2011 IPSC Handgun World Shoot Lady Production Silver
- 2014 IPSC Handgun World Shoot Lady Production Bronze
- 2017 IPSC Handgun World Shoot Lady Classic Gold
- 7 times Ladies Steel Challenge World Speed Shooting Champion
- 2 times IPSC US Handgun Championship Lady National Champion
- 13 times USPSA Lady National Champion
- 4 times IDPA Ladies National Champion
- 1999 US Army Female Athlete of the Year
- U.S. Army Marksmanship Unit Athlete of the Year
- 3 times S&W IDPA Winter Nationals Ladies Champion
- 2 times Bianchi Cup Ladies Open Champion
- 2 times ICORE Revolver Ladies Open Champion
- American Handgunner Ladies Champion
