= Miculek =

Miculek (/ˈmɪtʃəlɛk/; MITCH-ə-lek;) is a surname.

People by this name include:

- Jerry Miculek (born 1954) U.S. competition shooter
- Kay Clark-Miculek, U.S. competition shooter
- Lena Miculek (born 1995) U.S. competition shooter
