= BJ Norris =

Personal information
- Born: Tyler, Texas
Medal record
IPSC
Representing United States
IPSC Handgun World Shoot
| Silver medal – second place | 2005 Guayaquil | Open Junior |
IPSC US Handgun Championship
| Bronze medal – third place | 2015 Frostproof | Production |

BJ Norris is an American sport shooter who in the 2005 IPSC Handgun World Shoot took silver in the Open division Junior category. He started shooting competitively in USPSA late in 2000 at age 11, and became really serious about shooting in the 2005 season. Besides being known as an IPSC/ USPSA shooter, he is also well known for his Steel Challenge participation where he became World Champion in 2011.

== Merits ==
- 2005 IPSC Handgun World Shoot Open Junior Silver Medal
- 2015 IPSC US Handgun Championship Production Bronze Medal
- 2011 Steel Challenge World Champion
- 4 time Steel Challenge SteelMaster Division World Champion (2012, 2011, 2009 and 2008)
- 3 time Steel Challenge Rimfire Optics Division, World Champion (2011, 2009, 2007)
- 2012 Steel Challenge Iron Sight Pistol Division World Champion
- 2010 Steel Challenge Production Division World Champion
- 2006 Steel Challenge Junior World Champion
- 2011 Ruger Rimfire Series Overall World Champion
- 2012 FNH-USA3 Gun Championship, Tactical-Limited Division Champion
- 3 time USPSA Junior National Champion, Open Division (2007, 2006 and 2005)
- 2003 USPSA Junior National Champion, Production Division
- 3 time Steel Challenge SteelMaster Division National Champion (2012, 2011 and 2009)
- Steel Challenge Iron Sight Pistol Division National Champion (2012 and 2009)
- Steel Challenge Rimfire Optics Division National Champion (2008 and 2011)
