= USPSA Asia Pacific Championship =

The USPSA Asia Pacific Championship are yearly USPSA matches held by the Philippine Shooters and Match Officers Confederation (PSMOC). The first championship was held in 2016 at the Front Sight Shooting Range, Manila, Philippines. The 2017 USPSA Asia Pacific Championship is set to be held in the second half of 2017.

== History ==
The first USPSA match in the Philippines was the 2015 Magnus USPSA Christmas Shoot held Thursday to Sunday 10 to 13 December, 2015, with 12 stages at Parang, Marikina. The following year the first USPSA Asia Pacific Championship was held.

- 2016 USPSA Asia Pacific Championship: Wednesday to Sunday 20 to 24 July, 24 stages at the Front Sight Shooting Range, Manila, Philippines.
- 2017 USPSA Asia Pacific Championship (upcoming): Monday to Sunday November 27 to December 3, 36 stages at the Front Sight Shooting Range, Manila, Philippines.

Another notable event was the 2016 PSMOC Shooters Olympix held December 8 to 11 at the Front Sight Shooting Range, where the USPSA part of the match consisted of 18 stages.

== Champions ==
The following is a list of current and past USPSA Asia Pacific Champions.

=== Overall category ===
Year	Division	Gold	Silver	Bronze	Venue
2016	Carry Optics	Ronald Astillero	Johnny Brister	Reynold Cainto	Manila, Philippines
2016	Limited	Benzces Pascual	Rolly Nathaniel Tecson	Joseph Jr. Bernabe	Manila, Philippines
2016	Limited 10	Jeufro Lejano	Jay Guillermo Agayan	Ed Martin	Manila, Philippines
2016	Open	Niã‘O Roberto Leviste	Adrian Francisco	Gerardo Pilapil Jr.	Manila, Philippines
2016	Production	Jun Catalan	Jon Christoper Gotamco	Paul Brayant Yu	Manila, Philippines
2016	Revolver	Leonardo Gino	Benjamin Iii Carpio	Ronaldo Barcelona	Manila, Philippines
2016	Single Stack	Eric Cordero	Bernardo Mari Alejandro	Jerome Morales	Manila, Philippines

=== Junior category ===
Year	Division	Gold	Silver	Bronze	Venue
2016	Limited	Rolly Nathaniel Tecson	Datu Rubbil Mangudadatu	Kenn Quilang	Manila, Philippines
2016	Open	Datu Al Wali Mangudadatu	Datu Muhaimin Mangudadatu	Cesar Ryan Gacayan	Manila, Philippines

=== Senior category ===
Year	Division	Gold	Silver	Bronze	Venue
2016	Limited	Israelito Pible	Benjie Belarmino	Emmanuel Llaguna	Manila, Philippines
2016	Limited 10	Daniel Tan	Jose Suela	Ramon Soncuya	Manila, Philippines
2016	Open	Sonny Cu	Ben Hur Yap	Johnny Lim	Manila, Philippines
2016	Production	Wilfredo Anglo	Bogie Castro	Arnel Ariate	Manila, Philippines

=== Super Senior category ===
Year	Division	Gold	Silver	Bronze	Venue
2016	Limited	Jun Samonte	Ramon Ongpauco	Orlando Casanayan	Manila, Philippines

== See also ==
- USPSA Handgun Championship
- USPSA Multigun Championship
