= National Firearms Museum =

Museum located at the NRA Headquarters Building in Fairfax County, Virginia

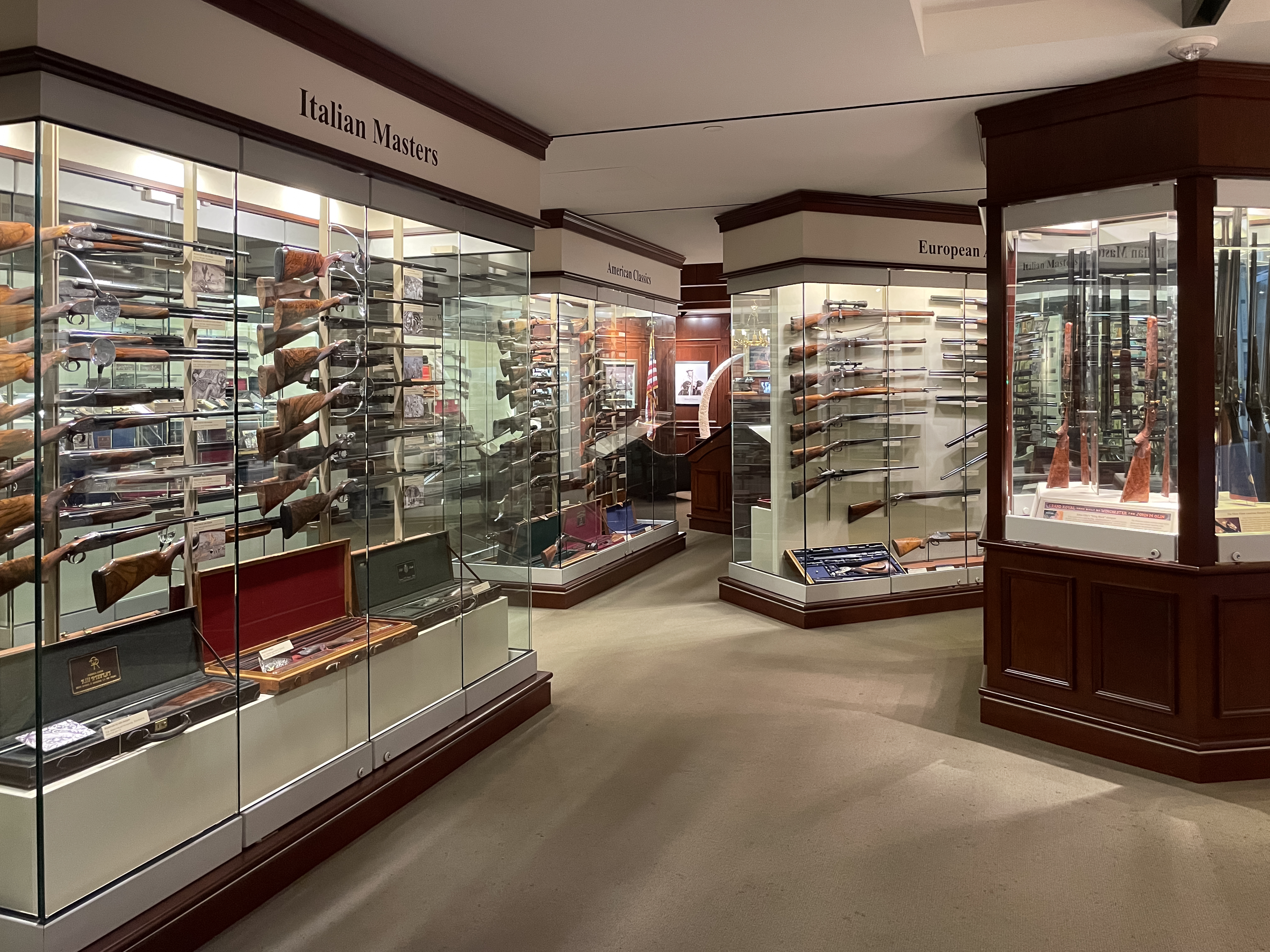
- (2024)

- Location within Virginia
- Location: 11250 Waples Mill Road; Fairfax County, Virginia, US
- Coordinates: 38.862972°N 77.335°W
- Director: Vacant
- Curator: Vacant
- Owner: National Rifle Association of America
- Website: www.nramuseum.org

The NRA National Firearms Museum is a museum located at the NRA Headquarters Building in Fairfax County, Virginia. Approximated 2,500 guns are displayed in 15,000 square feet. The NRA National Firearms Museum is operated by the Museums Division of the National Rifle Association of America (NRA), with partial funding provided by the NRA Foundation, a 501(c)3 corporation. It was established in 1935 at the old NRA Headquarters in Washington DC, and moved to its current location in 1998.

The museum's exhibits cover seven centuries of firearms development and history. The main museum galleries are organized chronologically. Exhibits include firearms used for competition shooting, hunting, personal defense, recreational shooting, and police work. Also on display are military arms used by the United States, its allies, and enemies in major conflicts from the American Revolution through Desert Storm. Each gallery is evocative of a period of time in American history, including a stockade fort at Jamestown, firearms of the Old West, a Coney Island shooting gallery ca. 1900, and a kid's bedroom from the 1950s. Life-sized dioramas include a nineteenth century rifle-maker's shop, a trench on the Western Front in WWI, and a shelled-out town square in Normandy in WWII. Two galleries feature firearms and the arts. "The Robert E. Petersen Gallery" features masterpieces of firearms engraving. The "Hollywood Guns" exhibit features actual guns used in movies and television over the past 80 years.

Historically attributed guns on display include:

- Guns owned by Presidents Theodore Roosevelt, John F. Kennedy, Dwight Eisenhower, and Ronald Reagan
- Firearms of exhibition shooters such as Annie Oakley, the Topperweins, and Ed McGivern
- The first machine gun used in combat by the U.S. Army (Roosevelt's Rough Riders)
- Guns of Olympic gold medalists including Launi Meili, and other shooting champions
- A massive four-bore rifle carried on the Stanley expedition to find Livingstone
- Sidearms of American generals and Medal of Honor recipients
- Napoleon Bonaparte's flintlock fowler
- Arms attributed to Gen. W. T. Sherman, abolitionist John Brown, "Buffalo Bill" Cody, and other historic figures.

The NRA Museums Division is the custodian of approximately 10,000 firearms with many of them displayed at three NRA Museums - the NRA National Firearms Museum in Fairfax County, Virginia; the NRA National Sporting Arms Museum at Bass Pro Shops in Springfield, Missouri; and the Frank Brownell Museum of the Southwest at the NRA Whittington Center in Raton, New Mexico.

The NRA Museums Division has published three books on firearms - Illustrated History of Firearms, Treasures of the NRA National Firearms Museum, and Guns of the NRA National Sporting Arms Museum. It has produced five seasons of the cable television shows NRA Gun Gurus and NRA Guns & Gold. NRA Museums staff, firearms, and locations are featured on Gun Stories, American Rifleman Television, the "NRA News Curators Corner" segment, and other television shows.
