= Chris Tilley (marksman) =

American professional shooter

Michael Christopher Tilley
Personal information
- National team: USA
- Born: 6 May 1985 (age 41) Winston-Salem, North Carolina
- Occupations: Firearms retailer and instructor
- Website: www.christilley.com www.supergrandchamp.com
Medal record
IPSC
Representing United States
| Gold medal – first place | 2002 Pietersburg | Open Junior |
| Gold medal – first place | 2005 Guayaquil | Open Junior |
IPSC US Handgun Championship
| Bronze medal – third place | 2012 Frostproof | Open |
| Gold medal – first place | 2013 Frostproof | Open |
| Bronze medal – third place | 2015 Frostproof | Standard |
| Bronze medal – third place | 2016 Frostproof | Open |
USPSA Handgun Nationals
| Bronze medal – third place | 2005 | Open |
| Gold medal – first place | 2006 | Open |
| Silver medal – second place | 2006 | Limited |
| Bronze medal – third place | 2007 | Open |
| Bronze medal – third place | 2007 | Limited |
| Gold medal – first place | 2008 | Open |
| Silver medal – second place | 2014 | Open |
| Gold medal – first place | 2015 | Open |
| Gold medal – first place | 2016 | Open |
| Silver medal – second place | 2017 | Open |

Michael Christopher Tilley (born May 6, 1985, in Winston-Salem, North Carolina) is a professional shooter and USPSA Grand Master. He is also known for competing in the second season of History Channel's marksmen competition Top Shot.

== Biography ==
Tilley was born on May 6, 1985, in Winston-Salem, North Carolina. He exhibited fascination and skill with firearms from a very young age. When he was eleven years old, his father built an indoor shooting range in Raleigh, North Carolina, affording Chris the opportunity to train and immerse himself. A year later, Tilley started competing at matches hosted by the IPSC and IDPA.

Tilley mentions one of his father's first employees, a former Marine named Cazz, as a significant influence in his sport shooting career. Cazz brought Tilley to his first IPSC match, drawing him further into competitive shooting. Tilley became a USPSA Grand Master at the age of fourteen, making him the youngest Grand Master in the history of the USPSA.

In 2002 and 2005, Tilley won the World Junior Champion title. In 2003, he won the Point Series Champion, among other titles. He has won over 50 major matches and four National Championships (2006, 2008, 2015, and 2016). Tilley currently works at his family shooting range as a retailer and instructor.

In 2011, Tilley appeared in the second season of History Channel's marksmen competition Top Shot. During the first half of the competition, Tilley competed as part of the Blue Team. His team ended up winning two challenges during his tenure, and Chris was nominated for elimination once. He was eliminated during the sixth week of the competition.

In April 2011, Tilley won the USPSA Area 6 Open Division Handgun Championship. In October of the same year, he competed at the IPSC World Shoot XVI in Greece, finishing #6 overall.

Further accomplishments include first place in the 2016 IPSC Australasia Championship in the Open division of the Handgun discipline, and placing in the top-three in two divisions of the 2007 USPSA National Handgun Championships.
