= IPSC US Handgun Championship =

Shooting competition

The IPSC US Handgun Championship are yearly IPSC level 3 matches held by the United States Practical Shooting Association (USPSA) run under IPSC-rules (contrary to the USPSA Handgun Championship, which is run under USPSA-rules). Sometimes, all of the pistol IPSC nationals are held at the same time, other years, they have been broken up between different ranges. In order to attend the nationals a competitor usually has to win a "slot" by placing well enough at various regional and Area Championship matches held throughout the year.

== Champions ==
The following is a list of current and past IPSC US Handgun Champions. There are usually some slots for entry by foreign competitors which will be eligible for the overall match win, but not for the national championship title.

=== Overall category ===
Year	Division	Gold	Silver	Bronze	Venue
1977		(United States) John Kirkham	(United States) Leonard Knight	(United States) Jerry Kay	
1978		(United States) Ross Seyfried	(United States) Raul Walters	(United States) Tom Campbell	
1979		(United States) Mickey Fowler	(United States) Ross Seyfried	(United States)	
1980		(United States) John Shaw	(United States) Ross Seyfried	(United States) Tom Campbell	
1981		(United States) John Shaw	(United States)	(United States)	
1981		(United States) Kent Williams	(United States)	(United States)	
1982		(United States) J Michael Plaxco	(United States)	(United States)	
1983		(United States) Rob Leatham	(United States)	(United States)	
1984		(United States) Rob Leatham	(United States)	(United States)	
1984	Revolver	(United States) Ralph Arbogast	(United States)	(United States)	
1985		(United States) Rob Leatham	(United States)	(United States)	
1986		(United States) Rob Leatham	(United States) J Michael Plaxco	(United States) Tommy Campbell	
1987		(United States) Jerry Barnhart	(United States) Rick Castelow	(United States) Rob Leatham	
1988		(United States) Rob Leatham	(United States)	(United States)	
1989		(United States) Rob Leatham	(United States) Jerry Barnhart	(United States) Angelo Spagnoli	
1990		(United States) Jerry Barnhart	(United States) Rob Leatham	(United States) Jethro Dionisio	
1991		(United States) Todd Jarrett	(United States) Jerry Barnhart	(United States) Doug Koenig	
1992		(United States) Jerry Barnhart	(United States) Rob Leatham	(United States) Michael Voigt	
1993	Open	(United States) Matthew Mclearn	(United States) Todd Jarrett	(United States) Jethro Dionisio	
1994	Open	(United States) Merle Edington	(United States) Jack Barnes	(United States) Rob Leatham	
1995	Open	(United States) Rob Leatham	(United States) Doug Koenig	(United States) Matt McLearn	
1996	Open	(United States) Jerry Barnhart	(United States) Todd Jarrett	(United States) Joe Kessler	
1997	Open	(United States) Todd Jarrett	(United States)	(United States) Eric Grauffel	
1998	Open	(United States) Todd Jarrett	(United States)	(United States)	
1999	Open	(United States) Jerry Barnhart	(United States)	(United States)	
2007	Open	(United States)	(United States)	(United States)	
2007	Standard	(United States)	(United States)	(United States)	
2007	Production	(United States)	(United States)	(United States)	
2007	Revolver	(United States)	(United States)	(United States)	
2008	Open	(United States)	(United States)	(United States)	
2008	Standard	(United States)	(United States)	(United States)	
2008	Production	(United States)	(United States)	(United States)	
2008	Revolver	(United States)	(United States)	(United States)	
2009	Open	(United States) Simon Racaza	(United States) Lee Dimaculangan	(United States) Alex Szakacs	
2009	Standard	(United States) Travis Tomasie	(United States) Taran Butler	(United States) Todd Jarrett	
2009	Production	(United States) Matthew Mink	(United States) Ben Stoeger	(United States) Robert Vogel	
2009	Revolver	(United States) Jerry Miculek	(United States) Cliff Walsh	(United States) Matt Griffin	
2010	Open	(United States)	(United States)	(United States)	
2010	Standard	(United States)	(United States)	(United States)	
2010	Production	(United States)	(United States)	(United States)	
2010	Revolver	(United States)	(United States)	(United States)	
2011	Open	(United States) Shane Coley	(United States) Ian Robson	(United States) Peter Oliver	Columbia, South Carolina
2011	Standard	(United States) Matthew Sweeney	(United States) Dustin Rademacher	(United States) Jack Suber	Columbia, South Carolina
2011	Production	(United States) Matthew Mink	(United States) Ben Stoeger	(United States) Frank Garcia	Columbia, South Carolina
2011	Modified	(United States) Roy Stedman	(United States)	(United States)	Columbia, South Carolina
2011	Revolver	(United States) Dan Girvan	(United States)	(United States)	Columbia, South Carolina
2012	Open	(United States) Shane Coley	(United States) Max Michel	(United States) Chris Tilley	Frostproof, Florida
2012	Standard	(United States) Dave Sevigny	(United States) Robert Vogel	(United States) Blake Miguez	Frostproof, Florida
2012	Production	(United States) Ben Stoeger	(United States) Matthew Mink	(United States) Frank Garcia	Frostproof, Florida
2012	Classic	(United States) Todd Jarrett	(United States) Ted Puente	(United States) Jeremy Reid	Frostproof, Florida
2012	Revolver	(United States) Matt Griffin	(United States) David Olhasso	(United States) Elliot Aysen	Frostproof, Florida
2013	Open	(United States) Chris Tilley	(United States) Lesgar Murdock	(United States) William Drummond	Frostproof, Florida
2013	Standard	(United States) Nils Jonason	(United States) Dave Sevigny	(United States) Emanuel Bragg	Frostproof, Florida
2013	Production	(United States) Ben Stoeger	(United States) Simon Racaza	(United States)	Frostproof, Florida
2013	Classic	(United States) Todd Jarrett	(United States) Jojo Vidanes	(United States) Craig Underdown	Frostproof, Florida
2013	Revolver	(United States) David Olhasso	(United States) Josh Lentz	(United States) Cliff Walsh	Frostproof, Florida
2014	Open	(United States)	(United States)	(United States)	Frostproof, Florida
2014	Standard	(United States)	(United States)	(United States)	Frostproof, Florida
2014	Production	(United States)	(United States)	(United States)	Frostproof, Florida
2014	Classic	(United States)	(United States)	(United States)	Frostproof, Florida
2014	Revolver	(United States)	(United States)	(United States)	Frostproof, Florida
2015	Open	(United States) KC Eusebio	(United States) Max Michel	(United States) Chris Tilley	Frostproof, Florida
2015	Standard	(United States) Dave Sevigny	(United States) Robert Vogel	(United States) Shane Coley	Frostproof, Florida
2015	Production	(United States) Ben Stoeger	(United States) Sal Luna	(United States) BJ Norris	Frostproof, Florida
2015	Classic	(United States) Elias Frangoulis	(United States) Gary Byerly	(United States) Jeremy Reid	Frostproof, Florida
2015	Revolver	(United States) Josh Lentz	(United States) David Olhasso	(United States) Daniel Sipioni Polverini, Jr.	Frostproof, Florida
2016	Open	(United States) Max Michel	(United States) Shannon Smith	(United States) Chris Tilley	Frostproof, Florida
2016	Standard	(United States) Bob Vogel	(United States) Dave Sevigny	(United States) Travis Tomasie	Frostproof, Florida
2016	Production	(United States) Sal Luna	(United States) Ben Stoeger	(United States) Mason Lane	Frostproof, Florida
2016	Classic	(United States) Rob Leatham	(United States) Elias Frangoulis	(United States) Jeremy Reid	Frostproof, Florida
2016	Revolver	(United States) Josh Lentz	(United States) Rich Wolfe	(United States) Michael Poggie	Frostproof, Florida
2017	Open	(United States) KC Eusebio	(United States) Shannon Smith	(United States) Lesgar Murdock	Frostproof, Florida
2017	Standard	(United States) Manny Bragg	(United States) Gorka Ibanez Cha	(United States) Ronald Brown	Frostproof, Florida
2017	Production	(United States) Sal Luna	(United States) Mason Lane	(United States) Hwansik Kim	Frostproof, Florida
2017	Classic	(United States) Elias Frangoulis	(United States) Randy Arrowood	(United States) John Mcclain	Frostproof, Florida
2019	Open	(United States) KC Eusebio	(United States) Shannon Smith	(United States) Andrew Hyder	Frostproof, Florida
2019	Standard	(United States) Nils Jonasson	(United States) Tim Yackley	(United States) Gaston Quindi Vallerga	Frostproof, Florida
2019	Production	(United States) Ben Stoeger	(United States) Sal Luna	(United States) Jacob Hetherington	Frostproof, Florida
2019	Classic	(United States) Elias Frangoulis	(United States) Jeremy Reed	Robert Cernigoj	Frostproof, Florida

=== Lady category ===
Year	Division	Gold	Silver	Bronze	Venue
1987		(United States) Debby James	(United States) Shirley Hamilton	(United States) Bert Geer	
1993	Open	(United States) Kay Clark	(United States) Sheila Brey	(United States) Valerie Levanza	
1994	Open	(United States) Kippi Boykin	(United States) Kay Clark	(United States) Sheila Brey	
1995	Open	(United States) Kay Miculek	(United States) Kippi Boykin	(United States) Sharon Edington	
1996	Open	(United States) Kippi Boykin	(United States) Kay Clark Miculek	(United States) Linda Chrabaszcz	
1998	Open	(United States) Kim Stroud	(United States)	(United States)	
1999	Open	(United States) Julie Goloski	(United States)	(United States)	
2009	Open	(United States) Rebecca T. Jones	(United States) Megan Francisco	(United States) Kay Miculek	
2011	Open	(United States) Kaci Cochran	(United States)	(United States)	Columbia, South Carolina
2011	Standard	(United States) Diana Adams	(United States)	(United States)	Columbia, South Carolina
2011	Production	(United States) Monica Sperduti	(United States)	(United States)	Columbia, South Carolina
2012	Open	(United States) Athena Lee	(United States) Kaci Cochran	(United States) Lydia Cuyong	Frostproof, Florida
2012	Standard	(United States) Caroline Facci	(United States) Carina Randolph	(United States) Tori Nonaka	Frostproof, Florida
2012	Production	(United States) Sara Dunivin	(United States) Cindi Thomas	(United States) Maggie Reese	Frostproof, Florida
2013	Open	(United States) Kaci Cochran	(United States) Jessie Duff	(United States) Lisa Munson	Frostproof, Florida
2013	Standard	(United States) Randi Rogers	(United States) Carina Randolph	(United States) Tori Nonaka	Frostproof, Florida
2013	Production	(United States) Sara Dunivin	(United States) Grace Tamayo	(United States) Cindi Thomas	Frostproof, Florida
2014	Open	(United States)	(United States)	(United States)	Frostproof, Florida
2014	Standard	(United States)	(United States)	(United States)	Frostproof, Florida
2014	Production	(United States)	(United States)	(United States)	Frostproof, Florida
2014	Classic	(United States)	(United States)	(United States)	Frostproof, Florida
2015	Open	(United States) Jessie Duff	(United States) Kaci Cochran	(United States) Sloan Tranum	Frostproof, Florida
2015	Standard	(United States) Tori Nonaka	(United States) Carina Randolph	(United States) Anne Colson	Frostproof, Florida
2015	Production	(United States) Sara Taylor	(United States) Cindi Thomas	(United States) Glenda Jover	Frostproof, Florida
2015	Classic	(United States) Julie Golob	(United States) Maggie Reese	(United States) Karyn Byerly	Frostproof, Florida
2019	Open	(United States) Jessie Duff	(United States) Athena Lee	Janet Tsui	Frostproof, Florida
2019	Standard	(United States) Michelle Viscusi	(United States) Becky Yackley	(United States) Jessica Nietzel	Frostproof, Florida
2019	Production	(United States) Justine Williams	(United States) Sara Taylor	(United States) Charis Denton	Frostproof, Florida
2019	Classic	(United States) Jalise Willams	(United States) Randi Rogers	(United States) Kimiko Donahue	Frostproof, Florida

=== Junior category ===
Year	Division	Gold	Silver	Bronze	Venue
2009	Open	(United States) Ben Thimpson	(United States) Sonny Morton	(United States) Nick Santiago	
2012	Open	(United States) Nic Neel	(United States) Billy Thalheimer	(United States) Ryan Bradley	Frostproof, Florida
2012	Standard	(United States) Daniel Jacinto	(United States) Tori Nonaka	(United States) Mark Saffery	Frostproof, Florida
2012	Production	(United States) Nevitt Morton	(United States) Jason Katz	(United States) Seth Clagg	Frostproof, Florida
2013	Open	(United States) Christopher Oosthuisen	(United States) Billy Thalheimer	(United States) Kincaid Ross	Frostproof, Florida
2013	Production	(United States) Jacob Hetherington	(United States) Nevitt Morton	(United States) Seth Clagg	Frostproof, Florida
2015	Open	(United States) Kincaid Ross	(United States) Ayden Parsons	(United States) Braden Piccinini	Frostproof, Florida
2015	Production	(United States) Ernesto Mantica	(United States) Parker Wallace	(United States) John Curtis	Frostproof, Florida

=== Senior category ===
Year	Division	Gold	Silver	Bronze	Venue
2011	Open	(United States) Mark Sightler	(United States) Donnie Bryson	(United States) Jeff Blevins	
2011	Standard	(United States) Paul Hendrix	(United States) Bob Novak	(United States) Sam Evans	
2012	Open	(United States) Michael Voigt	(United States) Johnny Lim	(United States) Chuck Bradley	Frostproof, Florida
2012	Standard	(United States) Frank Wuester	(United States) Anatoli Korobkin	(United States) Bruce Wells	Frostproof, Florida
2013	Open	(United States) Michael Voigt	(United States) Johan Hansen	(United States) Rob Townley	Frostproof, Florida
2013	Standard	(United States) Ron Avery	(United States) Alfredo Colon	(United States) David McMorris	Frostproof, Florida
2013	Production	(United States) Stefano Massa	(United States) Francisco Vigil	(United States) Jeff Stone	Frostproof, Florida
2013	Classic	(United States) Jim Duncan	(United States) Tony Hyatt	(United States) Glen Miller	Frostproof, Florida
2014	Open	(United States)	(United States)	(United States)	Frostproof, Florida
2014	Standard	(United States)	(United States)	(United States)	Frostproof, Florida
2014	Production	(United States)	(United States)	(United States)	Frostproof, Florida
2014	Classic	(United States)	(United States)	(United States)	Frostproof, Florida
2014	Revolver	(United States)	(United States)	(United States)	Frostproof, Florida
2015	Open	(United States) Kerry Pearson	(United States) Steven Thomas	(United States) Leighton Oosthuisen	Frostproof, Florida
2015	Standard	(United States) Manny Bragg	(United States) Ronald Brown	(United States) Kevin Bracken	Frostproof, Florida
2015	Production	(United States) Frank Garcia	(United States) Plinio Leon	(United States) Carlos Ruiz	Frostproof, Florida
2015	Classic	(United States) Todd Jarrett	(United States) John Koppi	(United States) Efren Camacho	Frostproof, Florida
2019	Open	Edoardo Buticchi	(United States) Chris Keen	(United States) Leighton Oosthuisen	Frostproof, Florida
2019	Standard	(United States) Ronald Brown	(United States) Andy Zavalla	(United States) Wally Burbage	Frostproof, Florida
2019	Production	(United States) Bill Capers	(United States) Brad Bolz	(United States) Dave Ramiel	Frostproof, Florida
2019	Classic	(United States) Roy Stedman	(United States) Gordon Carrell	(United States) Michael Morgan	Frostproof, Florida

=== Super Senior category ===
Year	Division	Gold	Silver	Bronze	Venue
2012	Open	(United States) Robert Keller	(United States) Sandy Thalheimer	(United States) George Novak	Frostproof, Florida
2012	Production	(United States) Duane Collins	(United States) Bob Clift	(United States) Larry Colson	Frostproof, Florida
2013	Open	(United States) Sandy Thalheimer	(United States) Glenn Seki	(United States) Michael Pelissier	Frostproof, Florida
2013	Standard	(United States) Dave Mueller	(United States) JJ Carrasquero	(United States) Hilrio Borro	Frostproof, Florida
2013	Production	(United States) Bruce Wells	(United States) Dan Predovich	(United States) Daniel Mas	Frostproof, Florida
2014	Open	(United States)	(United States)	(United States)	Frostproof, Florida
2014	Standard	(United States)	(United States)	(United States)	Frostproof, Florida
2014	Production	(United States)	(United States)	(United States)	Frostproof, Florida
2014	Classic	(United States)	(United States)	(United States)	Frostproof, Florida
2014	Revolver	(United States)	(United States)	(United States)	Frostproof, Florida
2015	Open	(United States) Errol Lawson	(United States) Marc Weir	(United States) Lee Perla	Frostproof, Florida
2015	Standard	(United States) Steve Miguez	(United States) Barry Berger	(United States) Chris Mathewson	Frostproof, Florida
2015	Classic	(United States) John Stamps	(United States) David Prysock	(United States) Tony Hyatt	Frostproof, Florida

== See also ==
- USPSA Handgun Championship
- USPSA Multigun Championship
- IPSC Handgun World Shoots
