= Athena Lee (disambiguation) =

Athena Lee may refer to:

- Athena Lee (born 1964), American musician
- Athena Lee Yen (born 1981), Taiwanese actress
- Athena Lee (markswoman), American competition shooter
