= Travis Tomasie =

American sport shooter

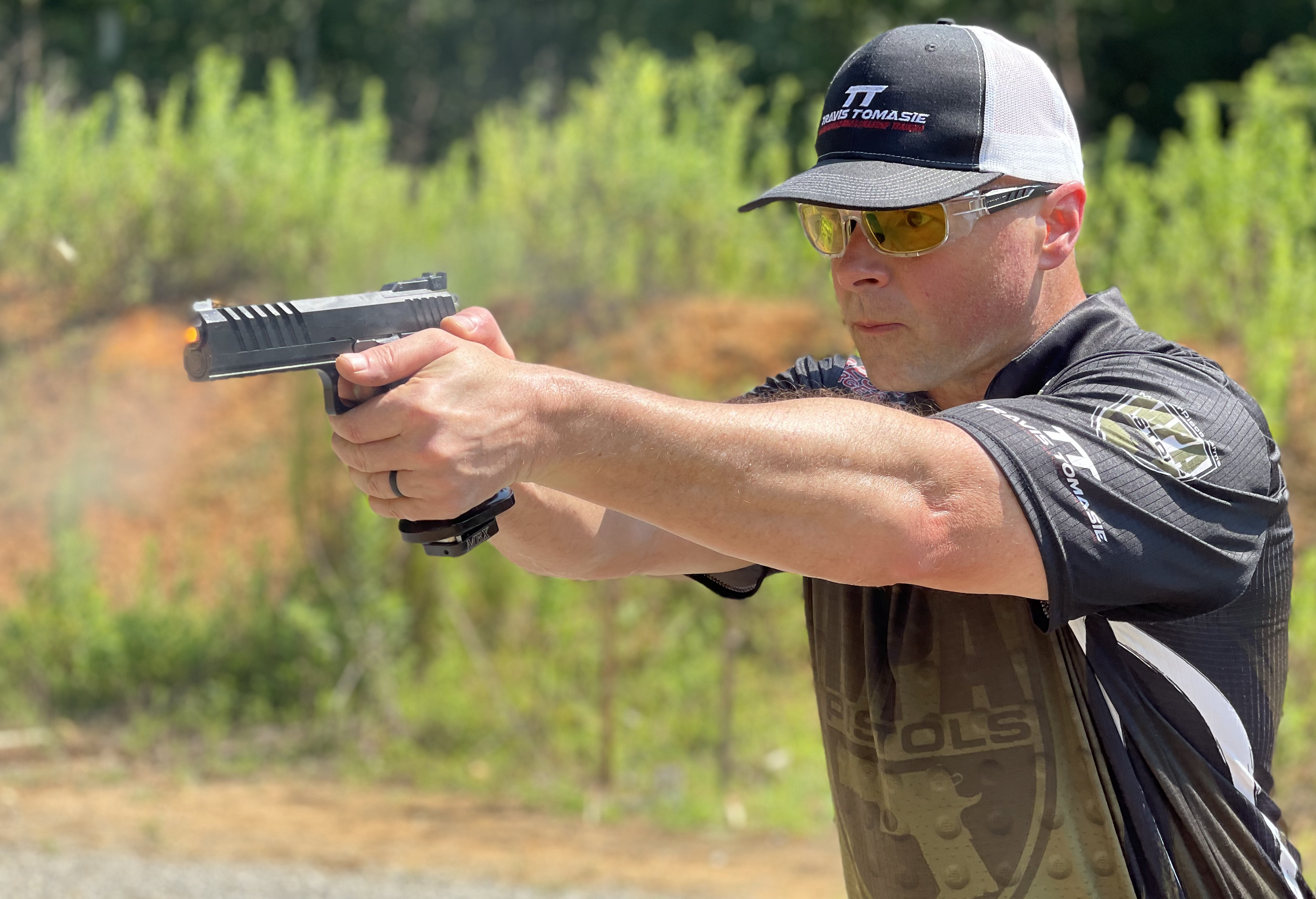

Personal information
- Born: 4 July United States
- Occupation(s): IPSC shooter, firearms instructor
- Website: travistomasie.com

Sport
- Team: USAMU 2003-2011 Team Para 2011-2014 Team Remington 2014-2020 Team Masterpiece Arms 2021
Medal record
IPSC
Representing United States
IPSC Handgun World Shoot
| Bronze medal – third place | 2005 Guayaquil | Standard |
| Gold medal – first place | 2008 Bali | Standard |
IPSC US Handgun Championship
| Gold medal – first place | 2009 | Standard |
| Gold medal – first place | 2010 | Standard |
| Bronze medal – third place | 2016 Frostproof | Standard |

Travis Tomasie is an American sport shooter, a firearms instructor, and a multiple world and national IPSC and USPSA champion.

Tomasie took gold in multiple USPSA National Championships, as well as the 2008 IPSC Handgun World Shoot in the Standard division and bronze at the 2005 World Shoot in the Standard division.

In addition to serving as the captain of multiple gold medal winning US National teams, Tomasie also owns and operates a marksmanship academy.

He is a US Army Veteran and former member of the United States Army Marksmanship Unit. He has been featured and prominently starred on TV's MythBusters, Shooting USA, Gallery of Guns, and a host of other shows.

Travis is now the Pro Shooter for Masterpiece Arms.
