= Marengo, Ohio =

- Village
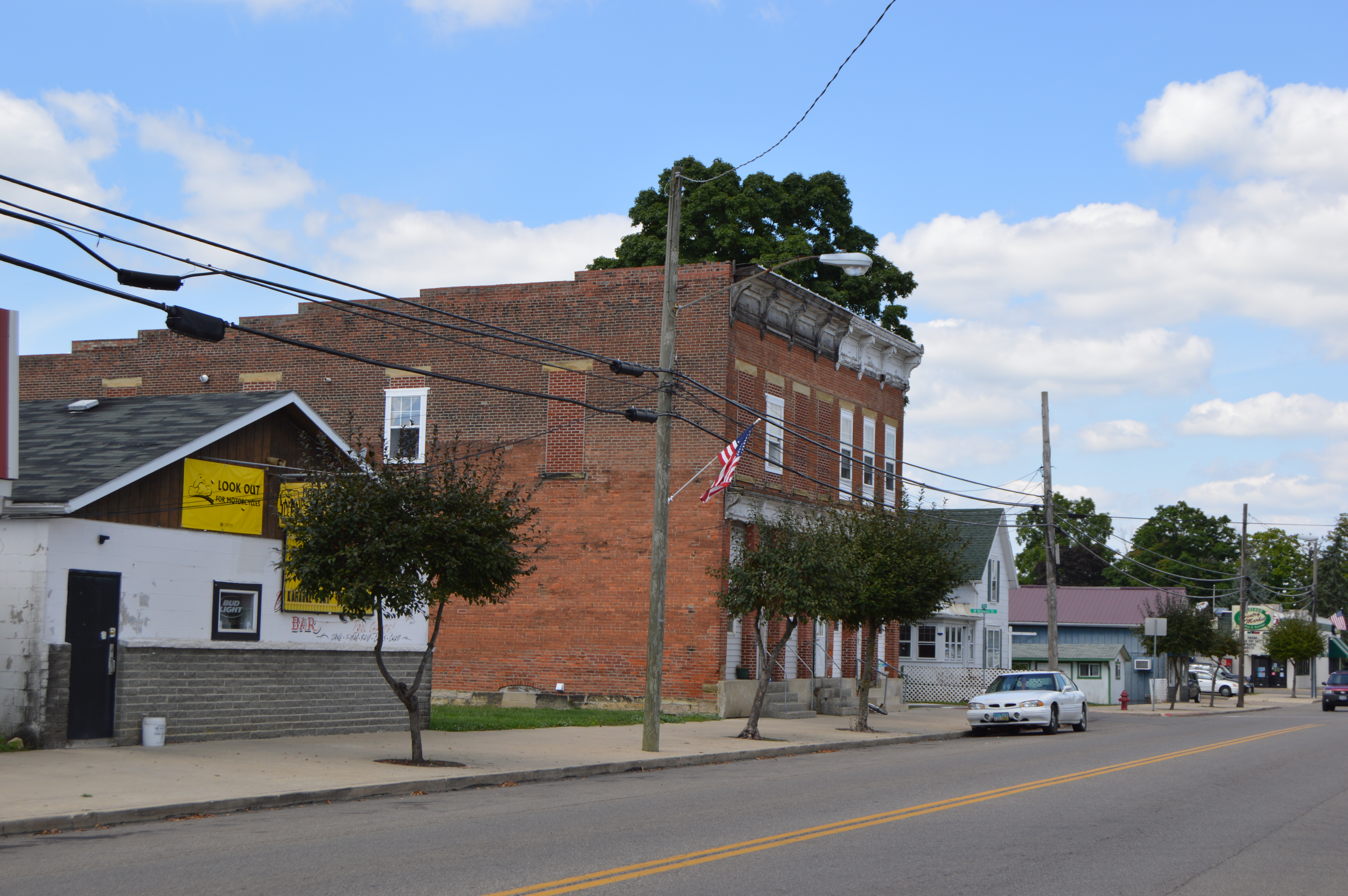
- Main Street downtown

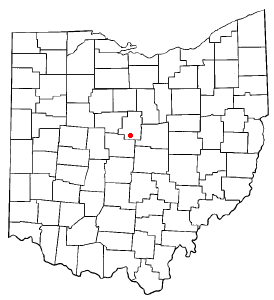
- Location of Marengo, Ohio

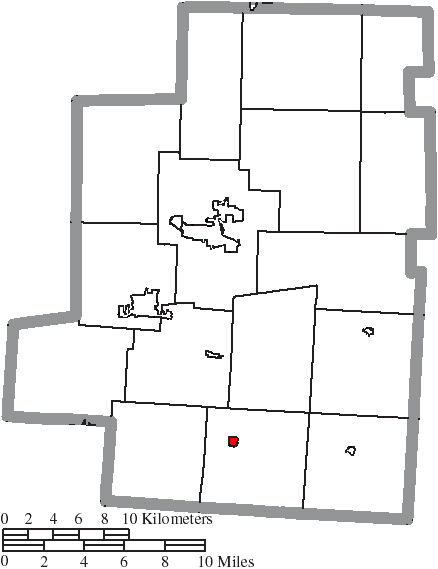
- Location of Marengo in Morrow County
- Coordinates: 40°24′03″N 82°48′40″W
- Country: United States
- State: Ohio
- County: Morrow
- Township: Bennington

Government
  - Type: Mayor-council

Area
  - Total: 0.17 sq mi (0.44 km^{2})
  - Land: 0.17 sq mi (0.44 km^{2})
  - Water: 0 sq mi (0.00 km^{2})
- Elevation: 1,158 ft (353 m)

Population (2020)
  - Total: 283
  - Density: 1,680.9/sq mi (648.98/km^{2})
- Time zone: UTC-5 (Eastern (EST))
  - Summer (DST): UTC-4 (EDT)
- ZIP code: 43334
- Area code: 419
- FIPS code: 39-47558
- GNIS feature ID: 2399254
- Website: http://www.villageofmarengo.org/

Marengo is a village in Morrow County, Ohio, United States. The population was 283 at the 2020 census. Marengo is south of Mount Gilead, the county seat.

== History ==
Marengo was platted in 1873, although there had been a permanent settlement at the site since 1843 when Isaac P. Freeman erected a cottage at the site. The settlement was initially known as Freeman's Corners. A post office called Marengo was established in either 1847 or 1848. The name was reportedly chosen in honor of the 1800 Battle of Marengo by Mrs. Isaac Freeman who was an admirer of Napoleon Bonaparte.

== Geography ==
Marengo is considered to be a part of "Central Ohio," and as of the 2020 census, the center of population of Ohio is near Marengo.

According to the United States Census Bureau, the village has a total area of 0.17 square miles (0.44 km^{2}), all of it land.

== Demographics ==
Historical population
Census	Pop.	Note	%±
1880	91		—
1890	276		203.3%
1900	242		−12.3%
1910	283		16.9%
1920	267		−5.7%
1930	225		−15.7%
1940	275		22.2%
1950	275		0.0%
1960	321		16.7%
1970	330		2.8%
1980	329		−0.3%
1990	393		19.5%
2000	297		−24.4%
2010	342		15.2%
2020	283		−17.3%
U.S. Decennial Census

=== 2010 census ===
As of the census of 2010, there were 342 people, 133 households, and 92 families living in the village. The population density was 2,011.8 inhabitants per square mile (776.8/km^{2}). There were 148 housing units at an average density of 870.6 per square mile (336.1/km^{2}). The racial makeup of the village was 95.3% White, 1.2% from other races, and 3.5% from two or more races. Hispanic or Latino of any race were 1.5% of the population.

There were 133 households, of which 42.9% had children under the age of 18 living with them, 40.6% were married couples living together, 19.5% had a female householder with no husband present, 9.0% had a male householder with no wife present, and 30.8% were non-families. 25.6% of all households were made up of individuals, and 12.8% had someone living alone who was 65 years of age or older. The average household size was 2.57 and the average family size was 3.08.

The median age in the village was 31.8 years. 31% of residents were under the age of 18; 8.4% were between the ages of 18 and 24; 27.1% were from 25 to 44; 22.9% were from 45 to 64; and 10.5% were 65 years of age or older. The gender makeup of the village was 48.0% male and 52.0% female.

=== 2000 census ===
As of the census of 2000, there were 297 people, 114 households, and 80 families living in the village. The population density was 1,668.8 inhabitants per square mile (644.3/km^{2}). There were 120 housing units at an average density of 674.3 per square mile (260.3/km^{2}). The racial makeup of the village was 95.96% White, 0.34% Asian, 0.34% from other races, and 3.37% from two or more races. Hispanic or Latino of any race were 0.67% of the population.

There were 114 households, out of which 41.2% had children under the age of 18 living with them, 48.2% were married couples living together, 11.4% had a female householder with no husband present, and 29.8% were non-families. 21.9% of all households were made up of individuals, and 5.3% had someone living alone who was 65 years of age or older. The average household size was 2.61 and the average family size was 3.05.

In the village, the population was spread out, with 29.6% under the age of 18, 10.8% from 18 to 24, 31.3% from 25 to 44, 19.9% from 45 to 64, and 8.4% who were 65 years of age or older. The median age was 31 years. For every 100 females there were 95.4 males. For every 100 females age 18 and over, there were 97.2 males.

The median income for a household in the village was $35,625, and the median income for a family was $47,000. Males had a median income of $33,125 versus $21,528 for females. The per capita income for the village was $14,768. About 3.5% of families and 9.2% of the population were below the poverty line, including 6.3% of those under the age of eighteen and none of those 65 or over.
