= Ed McGivern =

Exhibition shooter and author (1874–1957)

- McGivern from his book Fast and Fancy Revolver Shooting
- Born: Edward McGivern; October 20, 1874; Lewistown, Montana, U.S.
- Died: December 12, 1957 (aged 83); Butte, Montana, U.S.
- Occupations: Exhibition shooter, instructor, author
- Children: Emmitt McGivern

Edward McGivern (October 20, 1874 – December 12, 1957) was a famous exhibition shooter, shooting instructor and author of the book Fast and Fancy Revolver Shooting. McGivern performed extensive research into the art of handgun shooting, particularly with the double-action revolver.

== Book ==
The book Fast and Fancy Revolver Shooting, first published in 1938, is still printed by Skyhorse Publishing as a reference to handgun shooters. In it McGivern covers his career from early experimenting with single-action revolvers, his career in exhibition shooting, his police training, and his experiments in long-range revolver shooting.

== Exhibition shooting ==
Ed McGivern is renowned as one of the best handgunners that ever lived. His Guinness world record for "The greatest rapid-fire feat" (set on August 20, 1932 at the Lead Club Range, South Dakota) still stands. He emptied two revolvers in less than 2 seconds. He set another record on September 13, 1932, shooting five rounds from a double-action revolver at 15 feet in 2/5 of a second, and covering the group with his hand. His accomplishments include "firing two times from 15 feet five shots which could be covered by a silver half-dollar piece in 45/100 of a second". His shooting was so rapid, timing machines would malfunction in attempting to record his shooting speed.

McGivern was capable of many shooting feats, most of them well documented in his book. To name just a few:

- He could break six simultaneously hand-thrown clay pigeons (standard trap targets) in the air before they hit the ground.
- He could hit a tin can hand-thrown 20 ft in the air five times before it hit the ground.
- He could drive a tack or nail into wood by shooting it.
- He could shoot the spots out of playing cards at 18 feet, or even split a playing card edge on.
- He could shoot a dime on the fly.

All of these executed with either hand using a factory Smith & Wesson Model 10 double-action revolver (purportedly his favorite handgun).

Competition shooter Jerry Miculek has attempted, and broken, some of McGivern's long-standing records, such as the record for 60 shots fired from 10 revolvers. Although Miculek holds a number of records, his attempt to beat McGivern's 5-shot record resulted in a time of .57 seconds. A testament to McGivern's ability was that the 5-shot record was set in 1932, when McGivern was 57 years of age. Soon after that point, arthritis ended McGivern's competitive shooting career.

== Long range shooting ==
McGivern, along with his friend Elmer Keith, were instrumental in pushing the envelope in the early days of magnum revolvers. While Keith was primarily interested in hunting, McGivern was more interested in police use of the revolver. McGivern demonstrated that with proper sights and use, the .357 Magnum could be used on man-sized targets at ranges of up to 600 yards (550 m). McGivern experimented with different types of iron sights, including peep sights, and telescopic sights. His preferred type of iron sight for this use was a small-diameter rear aperture and a post with a gold bead for the front.

McGivern went on to instruct police agencies, including the FBI, in his shooting techniques.

== Legacy ==
In 2010, McGivern was inducted into the Montana Cowboy Hall of Fame.

== Book by Ed McGivern ==
- Ed McGivern's Book on Fast and Fancy Revolver Shooting, Springfield, MA: King-Richardson, 1938.
