= Kay Clark-Miculek =

American sport shooter

Sharon Kay Clark-Miculek
Personal information
- Spouse: Jerry Miculek
Medal record
IPSC
Representing United States
IPSC Handgun World Shoot
Gold medal – first place	1993 Bisley	Lady Open
Gold medal – first place	1996 Brasilia	Lady Open
Silver medal – second place	2005 Guayaquil	Lady Open
IPSC US Handgun Championship
Gold medal – first place	1993	Lady Open
Silver medal – second place	1994	Lady Open
Gold medal – first place	1995	Lady Open
Silver medal – second place	1996	Lady Open
Bronze medal – third place	2009	Lady Open

Kay Clark-Miculek is an American sport shooter with two IPSC Handgun World Shoot gold medals in the Open division Lady category (1993 and 1996) and one silver medal (2005). She has two gold medals from the IPSC US Handgun Championship, eight gold and one silver medal from the USPSA Handgun Nationals, and 7 times top woman in the Steel Challenge World Speed Shooting Championships and three time Steel Challenge World Speed Shooting Champion (1998, 1991 and 1987).

Kay is wife of Jerry Miculek and mother of their daughter Lena Miculek.
