= IPSC Australasia Handgun Championship =

Shooting competition

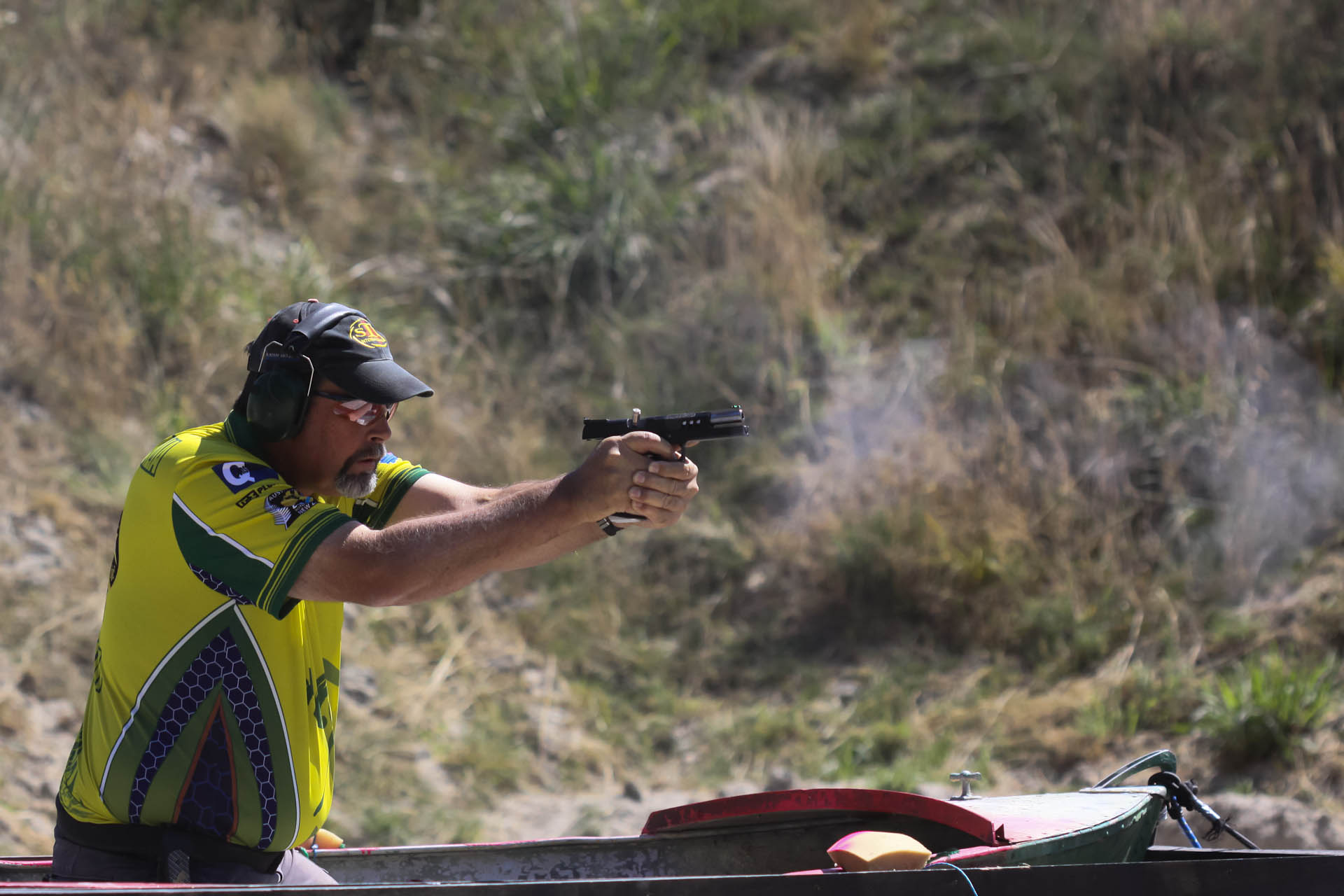
Standard division competitor during a stage at the 2013 IPSC Australasia Handgun Championship.

The IPSC Australasia Handgun Championship is an IPSC level 4 championship hosted every third year in Australasia.

== History ==
- 1996 Cebu, Philippines
- 1998 Melbourne, Australia
- 2001 Cebu, Philippines
- 2004 Bali, Indonesia
- 2007 Pattaya, Thailand
- 2010 Johor Bahru, Malaysia
- 2013 Rotorua, New Zealand
- 2016 Surabaya, Indonesia
- 2019 Philippines

== Champions ==
The following is a list of current and past IPSC Australasian Handgun Champions.

=== Overall category ===
Year	Division	Gold	Silver	Bronze	Venue
1996	Open				Cebu, Philippines
1996	Standard				Cebu, Philippines
1998	Open				Melbourne, Australia
1998	Standard				Melbourne, Australia
2001	Modified	(Philippines) Daniel Torrevillas			Cebu, Philippines
2001	Standard	(Philippines) Jay Agayan			Cebu, Philippines
2001	Production	(Philippines) Nelson Uygongco			Cebu, Philippines
2001	Revolver	(Philippines) Phillip Chua			Cebu, Philippines
2004	Open				Bali, Indonesia
2004	Standard				Bali, Indonesia
2004	Production				Bali, Indonesia
2007	Open	(Philippines) Jeufro Lejano			Pattaya, Thailand
2007	Standard				Pattaya, Thailand
2007	Production	(Philippines) Daniel Torrevillas			Pattaya, Thailand
2010	Open	(Philippines) Stephen Hinojales			Johor Bahru, Malaysia
2010	Standard	(Philippines) Edward Rivera			Johor Bahru, Malaysia
2010	Production	(Philippines) Wilfredo Anglo			Johor Bahru, Malaysia
2010	Revolver	(Philippines) Phillipp Chua			Johor Bahru, Malaysia
2013	Open				Rotorua, New Zealand
2013	Standard				Rotorua, New Zealand
2013	Production				Rotorua, New Zealand
2013	Classic				Rotorua, New Zealand
2013	Standard	(Philippines) Jethro Dionisio			Rotorua, New Zealand
2013	Production	(Philippines) Jeufro Emil Lejano			Rotorua, New Zealand
2013	Revolver	(Philippines) Phillip Chua			Rotorua, New Zealand
2016	Open	(Philippines) Edcel John Gino	(Thailand) Nattaphum Kamolwong	(Philippines) Keo Dayle Tuan	Surabaya, Indonesia
2016	Standard	(Philippines) Jethro Dionisio	(Philippines) Edward Rivera	(Philippines) Joseph Jr Bernabe	Surabaya, Indonesia
2016	Production	(Philippines) Jon Christopher Gotamco	(Philippines) Alfredo Jr Catalan	(Philippines) Adrian Peeters	Surabaya, Indonesia
2016	Classic	(Philippines) Jeufro Lejano	(Philippines) Bernardo Mari Alejandro	(Philippines) William Magalong	Surabaya, Indonesia
2016	Revolver	(Philippines) Leonardo Jr Gino	(Indonesia) Sonny Prabowo	(Thailand) Siri Phoothong	Surabaya, Indonesia
2019	Open	(Australia) Brodie Mcintosh	(Philippines) Edcel Gino	(Australia) David Mcconachie	Batangas City, Philippines
2019	Standard	(Philippines) Rolly Nathaniel Tecson	(Philippines) Kahlil Adrian Viray	(Philippines) Joseph Jr. Bernabe	Batangas City, Philippines
2019	Production	(Philippines) Jon Christopher Gotamco	(Philippines) Paul Bryant Yu	(Thailand) Nattaphum Kamolwong	Batangas City, Philippines
2019	Production Optics	(Philippines) Jerome Jovanne Morales	(Thailand) Kachen Jeakkhachorn	(Indonesia) Hans Christian Pratama	Batangas City, Philippines
2019	Production Optics Light	(Philippines) Paulo Paulino	(Philippines) Ronald Astrillero	(Philippines) Johann Abanilla	Batangas City, Philippines
2019	Classic	(Philippines) Jeufro Lejano	(Philippines) Edward Rivera	(Philippines) Alfredo Jr Catalan	Batangas City, Philippines
2019	Revolver	(Philippines) Phillip Chua	(Philippines) Leonardo Jr. Gino	(Thailand) Kabin Susiwa	Batangas City, Philippines

=== Lady category ===
Year	Division	Gold	Silver	Bronze	Venue
2010	Open	(Australia) Karla Blowers			Johor Bahru, Malaysia
2007	Standard	(Philippines) Jannette Gonzaga			Pattaya, Thailand
2010	Standard	(Philippines) Jannette Gonzaga			Johor Bahru, Malaysia
2010	Production	(Philippines) Andrea Gasic	(Philippines) Grace A Tamayo		Johor Bahru, Malaysia
2013	Production	(Philippines) Grace A Tamayo	(Philippines) Ma. Inez Jorge	(Philippines) Lyn Dela Cruz	Rotorua, New Zealand
2013	Open	(Australia) Karla Blowers			Rotorua, New Zealand
2013	Standard	(Philippines) Jannette Gonzaga			Rotorua, New Zealand
2016	Open	(Philippines) Andrea Ma Bernos	(Philippines) Janice Navato	(Hong Kong) Yin Sze Eliza Li	Surabaya, Indonesia
2016	Standard	(Australia) Claire Giles	(Philippines) Franchette Quiroz	(Thailand) Nahathai Maleipan	Surabaya, Indonesia
2016	Production	(Philippines) Evelyn Woods	(Philippines) Ma Inez Jorge	(Philippines) Kirstin Joy Gino	Surabaya, Indonesia
2019	Open	(Indonesia) Sarah Ayu Tamaela	(Philippines) Jessica Tampoco	(Philippines) Knelma Grace Mateo	Batangas City, Philippines
2019	Standard	(Philippines) Genesis Pible	(Philippines) Franchette Quiroz	(Philippines) Grace Tamayo	Batangas City, Philippines
2019	Production	(Thailand) Chanyanuch Perkyam	(Thailand) Patcharin Innhom	(Philippines) Evelyn Woods	Batangas City, Philippines

=== Junior category ===
Year	Division	Gold	Silver	Bronze	Venue
2007	Open	(Philippines) Blairwin Ortega			Pattaya, Thailand
2007	Production	(Philippines) John Alexander Laya			Pattaya, Thailand
2010	Open	(Philippines) Kenneth Ray Augustin			Johor Bahru, Malaysia
2010	Production	(Philippines) Diomari Ivan Tayag			Johor Bahru, Malaysia
2016	Open	(Thailand) Arif E-La	(Philippines) Mark Lester Enojado	(Thailand) Narawut Songsak	Surabaya, Indonesia

=== Senior category ===
Year	Division	Gold	Silver	Bronze	Venue
2001	Open	(Thailand) Wat Srijinta-anggul			Cebu, Philippines
2007	Production	(Philippines) Daniel Torrevillas			Pattaya, Thailand
2007	Revolver	(Philippines) Phillipp Chua			Pattaya, Thailand
2010	Open	(Thailand) Nikorn Chantharatanachok			Johor Bahru, Malaysia
2010	Production	(Philippines) Wilfredo Anglo			Johor Bahru, Malaysia
2013	Open	(Australia) Craig Ginger	(Australia) Phil Edwards	(Australia) David Blackaller	Rotorua, New Zealand
2013	Standard	(New Zealand) Julian Watson	(Australia) Robert Woodhouse	(Philippines) Benjamin Jr Belarmino	Rotorua, New Zealand
2013	Production	(Philippines) Wilfredo Anglo	(Australia) Andrew Moss	(Philippines) Rosendo Jr Castro	Rotorua, New Zealand
2013	Classic	(Australia) Simon Whitfield	(New Zealand) Mark Bush	(Philippines) Jose Maochi Suela	Rotorua, New Zealand
2013	Revolver	(Australia) David Blow	(Singapore) Michael Ho	(Australia) Michael Carr	Rotorua, New Zealand
2016	Open	(Philippines) Luis Panaguiton	(Australia) Darryl Tinning	(Thailand) Vorapol Kulchairattana	Surabaya, Indonesia
2016	Standard	(Thailand) Tanongsak Vanajak	(Philippines) John Ferdinand Macalino	(Australia) Peter Carey	Surabaya, Indonesia
2016	Production	(Australia) Robert Woodhouse	(Thailand) Sunan Wattanaboon	(Thailand) Sumran U-Prapruit	Surabaya, Indonesia
2016	Classic	(Philippines) Noel Anthony Tan	(Australia) Cameron Morris	(Australia) Mark Walklin	Surabaya, Indonesia
2019	Open	(Indonesia) Zaenal Arief Wangsanegara	(Australia) Kevin Whitehead	(Thailand) Vorapol Kulchairattana	Batangas City, Philippines
2019	Standard	(Philippines) Eduardo Yao	(Philippines) Carlos Luis Almazan	(Thailand) Tanongsak Vanajak	Batangas City, Philippines
2019	Production	(Philippines) Anthony Sy	(Philippines) Edwin Halili	(Philippines) Arnel Ariate	Batangas City, Philippines
2019	Classic	(Philippines) Nelson Uygongco	(Philippines) James Quing	(Thailand) Narongsak Kaewmuangpet	Batangas City, Philippines
2019	Revolver	(Philippines) Leonardo Jr. Gino	(Thailand) Kanchit Ostasat	(Thailand) Permphun Tapanya	Batangas City, Philippines

=== Super Senior category ===
Year	Division	Gold	Silver	Bronze	Venue
2010	Open	(Indonesia) Joseph Leonardy			Johor Bahru, Malaysia
2013	Open	(New Zealand) Jean-Claude Bouchut	(Thailand) Wat Srijinta-Anggul	(Philippines) Nolito Ladroma	Rotorua, New Zealand
2013	Standard	(Australia) Svend Nexo	(Hong Kong) Peter Dawson	(Philippines) Isagani Buenaflor	Rotorua, New Zealand
2013	Production	(Philippines) Nelson Lee	(New Zealand) Derek Davies	(New Zealand) Neil Hawkins	Rotorua, New Zealand
2013	Classic	(Australia) Ian Bond	(Australia) Alan Giles	(Australia) Sam Hui	Rotorua, New Zealand
2016	Open	(Thailand) Wat Srijinta-Anggul	(Philippines) Daniel Torrevillas	(Philippines) Tan Rolando	Surabaya, Indonesia
2016	Standard	(Philippines) Benjamin Jr Belarmino	(Philippines) Alfredo Tolentino	(Philippines) Isagani Buenaflor	Surabaya, Indonesia
2016	Production	(Philippines) Edwin Gotamco	(Philippines) Daniel Tan	(Philippines) Samonte Renato Jr	Surabaya, Indonesia
