= 2005 IPSC Handgun World Shoot =

International shooting tournament

2005 IPSC Handgun World Shoot XIV
- Official logo of the 2005 IPSC Handgun World Shoot
- Location: Guayaquil, Ecuador
- Dates: Sunday 21. to Saturday 27. August 2005
- Competitors: 887 from 56 nations

Medalists
gold medal	Open (Largest Division) (France) Eric Grauffel
silver medal	(United States) Todd Jarrett
bronze medal	(Spain) Jorge Ballesteros

The 2005 IPSC Handgun World Shoot XIV held in Guayaquil, Ecuador was the 14th IPSC Handgun World Shoot. Once again, Eric Grauffel took the Open title. He was now an 18-year-old student and had already won many European titles, and after the 2005 World Championship, also three World Shoots.

== Champions ==
=== Open ===
The Open division had the largest match participation with 300 competitors (33.8 %).

Individual

Overall	Competitor	Points	Overall Match Percent	
Gold	(France) Eric Grauffel	2782.1099	100.00%	
Silver	(United States) Todd Jarrett	2677.3271	96.23%	
Bronze	(Spain) Jorge Ballesteros	2654.5232	95.41%	
4th	(United States) Max Michel	2624.4067	94.33%	
5th	(United States) Simon Racaza	2565.8483	92.23%	
6th	(Israel) Saul Kirsch	2555.8545	91.87%	
7th	(Australia) Brodie McIntosh	2543.1820	91.41%	
8th	(United States) Chris Tilley	2523.3948	90.70%	
9th	(Brazil) Jaime Saldanha	2522.5591	90.67%	
10th	(Czech Republic) Martin Kamenicek	2500.2538	89.87%	
Lady	Competitor	Points	Overall percent	Category percent
Gold	(Austria) Gabriele Kraushofer	2022.3743	72.69%	100.00%
Silver	(United States) Kay Clark Miculek	1979.3643	71.15%	97.87%
Bronze	(Australia) Linda Blowers	1950.9736	70.13%	96.47%
Junior	Competitor	Points	Overall percent	Category percent
Gold	(United States) Chris Tilley	2523.3948	90.70%	100.00%
Silver	(United States) BJ Norris	2336.5015	83.98%	92.59%
Bronze	(United States) KC Eusebio	2264.3764	81.39%	89.74%
Senior	Competitor	Points	Overall percent	Category percent
Gold	(Czech Republic) Miroslav Kamenicek	2034.7961	73.14%	100.00%
Silver	(Jamaica) Ronald Brown	2030.5476	72.99%	99.79%
Bronze	(Canada) Frank Koch	1901.0850	68.33%	93.43%
Super Senior	Competitor	Points	Overall percent	Category percent
Gold	(United States) Ralph Arredondo	1924.7638	69.18%	100.00%
Silver	(United States) Allan Zitta	1909.5546	68.63%	99.21%
Bronze	(Finland) Jorma Kotkatvuori	1749.4703	62.88%	90.89%

Teams Open

Overall	Country	Points	Percent	Team members
Gold	United States	7713.6498	100.00%	Max Michel, Simon Racaza, Chris Tilley, Jojo Vidanes
Silver	France	7434.0725	96.37%	Eric Grauffel, Eddy Testa, Frederic Loore, William Joly
Bronze	Australia	7320.2826	94.90%	Brodie McIntosh, Errol Thomas, David McConachie, David Soldini
Lady teams	Country	Points	Percent	Team members
Gold	Australia	5752,3499	100.00%	Gabriele Kraushofer, Anita Klien, Margit Steurer, Nicole Laschitz
Silver	United States	5747,4781	99,91%	Kay Clark-Miculek, Athena Lee, Sheryl Cruz, Tonda Gilfillan
Bronze	Australia	5642.1511	98.08%	Linda Blowers, Kerri Anderson, Karla Blowers, Suzy Ballantyne

=== Modified ===
The Modified division had 49 competitors (5.5 %).

Individual

Overall	Competitor	Points	Overall Match Percent	
Gold	(Philippines) Jeufro Jag Lejano	2708.6871	100.00%	
Silver	(Brazil) Augusto Ribas	2630.4720	97.11%	
Bronze	(Philippines) Nelson Uygongco	2620.5331	96.75%	
4th	(South Africa) Austen Stockbridge	2608.3401	96.30%	
5th	(Philippines) Lyndon Biraogo	2565.3152	94.71%	
6th	(Philippines) Joseph Sy	2524.2198	93.19%	
7th	(Italy) Roberto Vezzoli	2522.3350	93.12%	
8th	(Czech Republic) Josef Rakusan	2495.7582	92.14%	
9th	(Italy) Edoardo Buticchi	2489.0082	91.89%	
10th	(Italy) Giuseppe Todaro	2427.3161	89.61%	
Senior	Competitor	Points	Overall percent	Category percent
Gold	(Italy) Mario Riillo	2322.8070	85.75%	100.00%
Silver	(Czech Republic) Vaclav Martinek	2226.7238	82.21%	95.86%
Bronze	(Ecuador) Roberto Gilbert	1840.5542	67.95%	79.24%

Teams Modified

Overall	Country	Points	Percent	Team members
Gold	Philippines	7894.5354	100.00%	Jeufro Jag Lejano, Nelson Uygongco, Lyndon Biraogo, Joseph Sy
Silver	Italy	7189.7211	91.07%	Roberto Vezzoli, Giuseppe Todaro, Giorgio Patria
Bronze	Czech Republic	7140.1217	90.44%	Josef Rakusan, Zdenek Henes, Jiri Lelic, Vaclav Martinek

=== Standard ===
The Standard division had the second largest match participation with 294 competitors (33.1 %).

Individual

Overall	Competitor	Points	Overall Match Percent	
Gold	(United States) Rob Leatham	2677.1401	100.00%	
Silver	(Spain) Juan Carlos Jaime Diaz	2644.1020	98.77%	
Bronze	(United States) Travis Tomasie	2634.5106	98.41%	
4th	(Italy) Adriano Santarcangelo	2618.2367	97.80%	
5th	(United States) Michael Voigt	2539.0921	94.84%	
6th	(Guatemala) Estuardo Gomez	2539.0921	94.84%	
7th	(United States) Blake Miguez	2519.8924	94.13%	
8th	(United States) Taran Butler	2517.5081	94.04%	
9th	(United States) Phillip Strader	2493.8973	93.16%	
10th	(United States) Emanuel Bragg	2468.9081	92.22%	
Lady	Competitor	Points	Overall percent	Category percent
Gold	(Germany) Petra Tutschke	1918.8980	71.68%	100.00%
Silver	(United States) Julie Golob	1841.4905	68.79%	95.97%
Bronze	(Czech Republic) Michaela Horejsi	1667.3136	62.28%	86.89%
Junior	Competitor	Points	Overall percent	Category percent
Gold	(Czech Republic) Zdenek Liehne	2172.1813	81.14%	100.00%
Silver	(Ecuador) Carlos Palma	1986.0754	74.19%	91.43%
Bronze	(Czech Republic) Zdenek Svelha Jr	1974.0221	73.74%	90.88%
Senior	Competitor	Points	Overall percent	Category percent
Gold	(Italy) Esterino Magli	2192.3688	81.89%	100.00%
Silver	(Argentina) Ricardo Gentile	2073.6951	77.46%	94.59%
Bronze	(Switzerland) Peter Kressibucher	2021.5919	75.51%	92.21%
Super Senior	Competitor	Points	Overall percent	Category percent
Gold	(Germany) Max Wiegand	1872.0066	69.92%	100.00%
Silver	(Brazil) Antonio Vaghi	1644.4123	61.42%	87.84%
Bronze	(Austria) Hubert Ceh	1590.4808	59.40%	84.96%

Teams Standard

Overall	Country	Points	Percent	Team members
Gold	United States	7603.5283	100.00%	Michael Voigt, Taran Butler, Phillip Strader, Emanuel Bragg
Silver	Italy	7278.9330	95.73%	Adriano Santarcangelo, Guido Ciccarelli, Valter Tranquilli, Leonardo Bettoni
Bronze	Spain	7167.6585	94.26%	Juan Carlos Jaime Diaz, Eduardo de Cobos, Pablo Jimenez, Antonio Cases

=== Production ===
The Production division had the third largest match participation with 213 competitors (24.0 %).

Individual

Overall	Competitor	Points	Overall Match Percent	
Gold	(Czech Republic) Adam Tyc	2644.0627	100.00%	
Silver	(United States) Dave Sevigny	2620.0138	99.09%	
Bronze	(United States) Angus Hobdell	2570.2337	97.21%	
4th	(Slovakia) Marian Vysny	2534.6265	95.86%	
5th	(Italy) Paolo Brocanelli	2444.7379	92.46%	
6th	(Italy) Riccardo Lipartiti	2437.2091	92.18%	
7th	(Czech Republic) Vaclav Vinduska	2436.5314	92.15%	
8th	(Italy) Dario Forlani	2403.2733	90.89%	
9th	(Italy) Giovanni Zuccolo	2371.3340	89.69%	
10th	(United States) David Olhasso	2362.2776	89.34%	
Junior	Competitor	Points	Overall percent	Category percent
Gold	(Czech Republic) Adam Tyc	2644.0627	100.00%	100.00%
Silver	(Ecuador) Galo Moreira	1965.4404	74.33%	74.33%
Bronze	(Guatemala) Luis Gonzalez	1839.9281	69.59%	69.59%
Senior	Competitor	Points	Overall percent	Category percent
Gold	(Philippines) Daniel Torrevillas	1869.0449	70.68%	100.00%
Silver	(United States) John Michael France	1848.8003	69.92%	98.92%
Bronze	(Slovakia) Štefan Ács	1697.3698	64.19%	90.81%

Teams Production

Overall	Country	Points	Percent	Team members
Gold	Czech Republic	7382.1817	100.00%	Adam Tyc, Vaclav Vinduska, David Zverina, Jaroslav Pulicar
Silver	Italy	7219.3452	97.79%	Paolo Brocanelli, Dario Forlani, Giovanni Zuccolo, Mario Piccioni
Bronze	United States	7145.4054	96.79%	Dave Sevigny, David Olhasso, John Flentz, Roger Sherman

=== Revolver ===
The Revolver division had 31 competitors (3.5 %).

Individual

Overall	Competitor	Points	Overall Match Percent	
Gold	(United States) Jerry Miculek	2765.4470	100.00%	
Silver	(Ecuador) Ricardo López Tugendhat	2680.1927	96.92%	
Bronze	(Netherlands) Bjorn Dietrich	2565.6320	92.77%	
4th	(Philippines) Phillipp Chua	2394.9707	86.60%	
5th	(Italy) Andrea Todeschini	2341.7587	84.68%	
6th	(Czech Republic) Zdenek Nemecek	2302.8470	83.27%	
7th	(Brazil) Moacir Azevedo	2236.1721	80.86%	
8th	(Brazil) Allison Vericio	2209.2139	79.89%	
9th	(Italy) Igor Rosa Brusin	2134.6900	77.19%	
10th	(Brazil) Fernando Becker	2130.2292	77.03%	
Senior	Competitor	Points	Overall percent	Category percent
Gold	(United States) Jerry Miculek	2765.4470	100.00%	100.00%
Silver	(Czech Republic) Lumir Safranek	2054.3294	74.29%	74.29%
Bronze	(United States) Patrick Sweeney	2002.2405	72.40%	72.40%

Teams Revolver

Overall	Country	Points	Percent	Team members
Gold	United States	6801.2698	100.00%	Jerry Miculek, Clifford Walsh, Patrick Sweeney, Lisa Farrell
Silver	Brazil	6477.1611	95.23%	Moacir Azevedo, Allison Vericio, Wagner Almeida, Raul Fleury Mariate
Bronze	Italy	6341.0763	93.23%	Andrea Todeschini, Igor Rosa Brusin, Alessandro Bianconi

== See also ==
- IPSC Rifle World Shoots
- IPSC Shotgun World Shoot
- IPSC Action Air World Shoot
