= Jerry Miculek =

American speed shooter

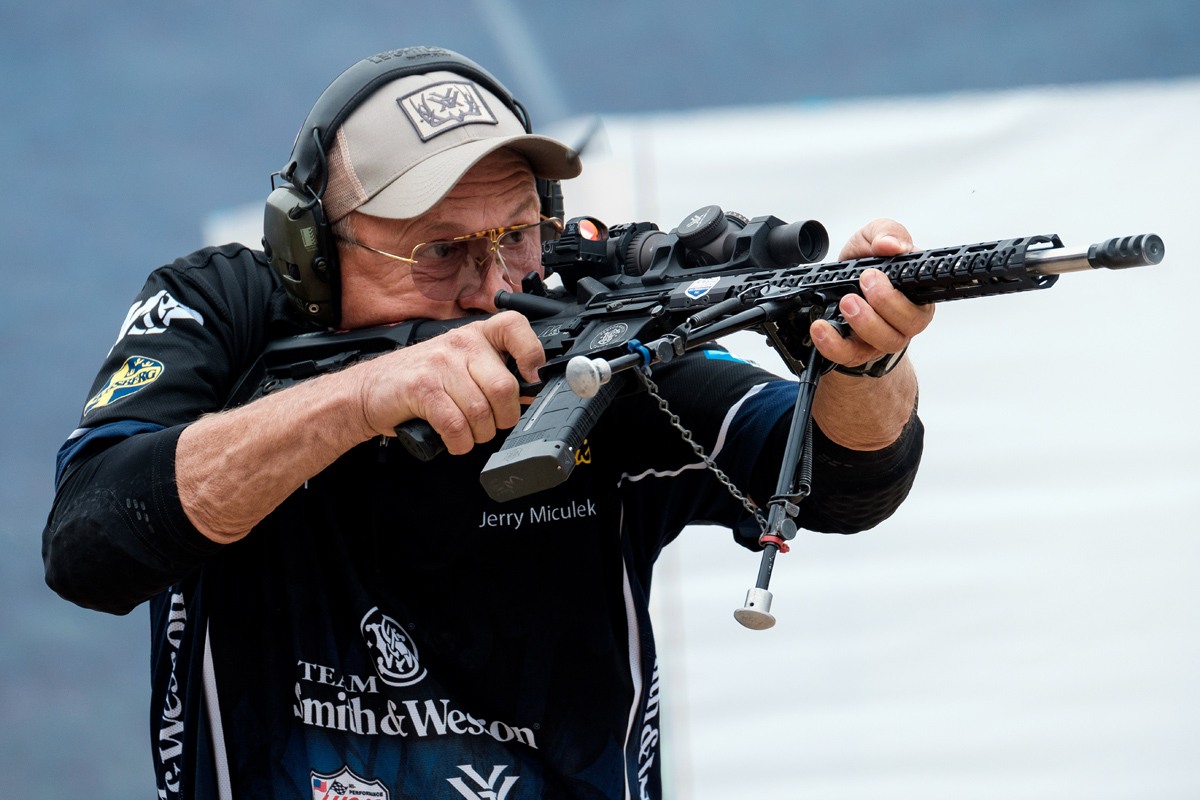
- Miculek at the 2017 IPSC Rifle World Shoot in Moscow, Russia

Personal information
- Born: 7 September 1954 (age 71) Freeport, Texas, U.S.
- Occupations: Professional shooter, Gunsmith, YouTube personality
- Spouse: Kay Clark-Miculek
- Website: miculek.com
Medal record
IPSC
Representing United States
IPSC Handgun World Shoot
Gold medal – first place	2002 Pietersburg	Revolver
Gold medal – first place	2005 Guayaquil	Revolver
Gold medal – first place	2005 Guayaquil	Senior Revolver
Silver medal – second place	2011 Rhodes	Revolver
Gold medal – first place	2011 Rhodes	Senior Revolver
IPSC US Handgun Championship
Gold medal – first place	2009	Revolver
IPSC Rifle World Shoot
Gold medal – first place	2017 Moscow	Open Super Senior
Gold medal – first place	2019 Karlskoga	Open Super Senior
IPSC Shotgun World Shoots
Gold medal – first place	2012 Debrecen	Senior Open
IPSC Pan-American Shotgun Championship
Gold medal – first place	2013 Kentucky	Open

Jerry Charles Miculek Jr. (/ˈmɪtʃəlɛk/ MITCH-ə-lek; born September 7, 1954) is an American professional competition shooter known for his achievements in 3-Gun and speed shooting. He holds five officially sanctioned world records in revolver shooting and over 15 unsanctioned records with firearms ranging from 9mm semi-automatic pistols to the .50 BMG Barrett M107 anti-materiel rifle. Additional accomplishments include rapid-firing 12 shots (including one quick reload) from a six-shooter in 2.99 seconds, fast-shooting six shots in .98 seconds from a handheld Barrett M107, and a 1000-yard off-hand shot with his 9mm Smith & Wesson revolver.

Miculek is also a gunsmith who tunes and adjusts his own firearms for optimum function. In addition to a channel on YouTube, he has a reality show, Shootout Lane on the Outdoor Channel. Miculek worked as a millwright at Freeport Chemical for 15 years before becoming a professional shooter in 1989. He is married to Kay Clark-Miculek, herself a shooter with national and world titles. His daughter, Lena Miculek, is also a shooter with IPSC world titles.

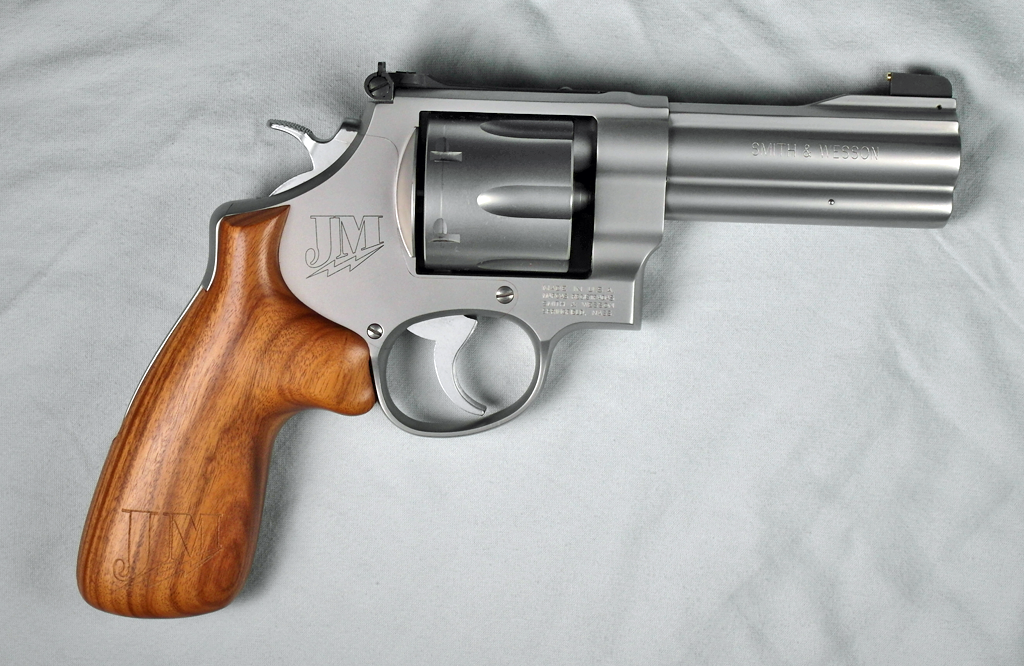
Smith & Wesson 625JM revolver (Jerry Miculek edition), chambered in .45ACP

Miculek is endorsed by Smith & Wesson, who named the S&W Model 625JM model for him. In 2014, Smith & Wesson released the Miculek series Smith & Wesson Model 929 9mm revolver, designed in part by Miculek. Mossberg offers Miculek signature series shotguns and a rifle compensator of his design.

== Biography and early career ==
Born in Freeport, Texas, Miculek was in Texas for three days before moving with his family to southern Louisiana where he lived for the next thirty-seven years. He was the third of five brothers. Miculek was named after his father after being born on his birthday. Miculek worked as a millwright at Freeport Chemical for fifteen years before becoming a professional shooter in 1989. At age 37, Miculek met his future wife, Kay Clark Miculek, another competitive shooter.

Miculek estimates that in his lifetime he has shot over two million rounds of ammunition, which equals approximately 30 tons of lead.

== Major accomplishments and wins ==
Miculek holds over 100 national and world shooting titles including:

- Two time Overall IPSC Revolver World Champion (2002 and 2005), and two time Senior IPSC Revolver World Champion (2005 and 2011).
- Seven time USPSA 3-Gun National Championship
- Four time National USPSA Multigun Champion
- Four time 2nd Chance Bowling Pin Champion
- 1997, 2007 and 2011 American Handgunner World Shoot-Off Champion, and the only person ever to win this title with a revolver.
- Twenty-one time International Revolver Champion
- Member of seven time winning pro team at the Sportsmans Team Challenge
- Eight time National USPSA Revolver Champion
- Three time Masters International Long Gun Champion
- Ten time IDPA Enhanced Service Revolver Champion
- One time Bianchi Cup NRA World Action Pistol Metallic Champion

== World records held ==
Task	Firearm(s) Used	Time (sec)	Date	Notes
Fire six shots (each) from 10 different .38 caliber revolvers	S&W Model 64 revolvers (10)	17.12	September 25, 2003	Broke Ed McGivern's record of 25 seconds.
Fire six shots, reload, fire six shots from 1 revolver	S&W Model 625 revolver	2.99	September 11, 1999	
Fire eight shots from a revolver on a single target	S&W Model 627 V-Comp revolver	1.00	September 11, 1999	
Fire eight shots from a revolver on four targets (2 hits each target)	S&W Model 627 V-Comp revolver	1.06	September 11, 1999	
Fire six shots from a .50 BMG rifle	Barrett M107 rifle with no work done	0.98	August 31, 2013	
Fire 5 shots from a .50 AE pistol	Desert Eagle pistol with no work done	0.82	December 31, 2013	
Fire 5 shots from a 500 magnum revolver	Smith & Wesson Model 500 revolver with no work done	1.14	December 24, 2013	
Dual wield 2 .223 pistols 19 shots on 5 different targets 'V-Drill'	AR-15 pistol with no work done	3.10	July 14, 2014	
Fire 16 shots on 1 target with reload from a 9mm revolver	Smith & Wesson 929 revolver with action job	4.01	April 24, 2014	
Fire 6 shots from a revolver	Chiappa Rhino 50DS revolver with no work done	1.03	May 26, 2013	
23 shots on 1 target with 12 gauge shotgun	Mossberg 930 shotgun	3.73	May 13, 2013	
Fire 1 shot at 200 yards holding .357 magnum revolver upside down with little finger hitting 1 target	Smith & Wesson 340PD revolver	no time	October 30, 2013	
Fast shooting 1 grape from low ready at 6 yards with a .223 rifle	AR-15 rifle Smith & Wesson M&P-15 compensated	0.53	May 26, 2014	
Fire 2 shots at 2 separate targets 20 yards away from each other with a pump shotgun	Mossberg 500 shotgun chamber empty from 20 yards away	0.78 total time (including reaction)	September 23, 2014	
Fire 40 rounds from a .223 rifle	IWI Tavor rifle semi-automatic with no work done	6.48	June 27, 2013	
Fire 9 shots on 5 different targets with a .50 BMG rifle 'V-Drill'	Barrett M107 rifle with no work done	2.95	September 5, 2013	
Fire 1 shot at 1000 yards, double-action, with a 9mm revolver	Smith & Wesson 929 revolver action job	no time	August 4, 2014	
Fire 1 shot at 1000 yards with a .50 BMG rifle starting at low ready	Barrett M107 rifle	2.10	November 16, 2014	
Fire 2 shots at 2 targets from 400 meters with a 9mm revolver; upside down, double-action, with the little finger	Smith & Wesson 929 revolver	no time	March 9, 2015	
Fire 10 shots at 3 different targets, 4 center mass and 2 headshots (center target), 2 in right and left target, headshot, 'Share The Love'	Smith & Wesson M&P 15T rifle with JM-Pro Trigger	1.59 (including reaction)	January 17, 2017	Beat his own record of 1.76 seconds
Fastest time to hit 6 target plates from 7 yards with a 9mm caliber handgun	red-dot-equipped Smith & Wesson revolver	2.01	October 6, 2023	Broke Max Michel's record of 2.05 seconds
Fastest time to hit 6 target plates from 7 yards with a 9mm caliber revolver	red-dot-equipped Smith & Wesson revolver	1.88	October 6, 2023	

Miculek also demonstrated the ability to fire five shots from a revolver on target with a S&W Model 64 ported barrel revolver in 0.57 seconds on September 25, 2003. This is slower than the record held by Ed McGivern of 0.45 seconds (first shot on 9/13/1932, reproduced 4 times on 12/8/1932). Originally recorded as "two-fifths of a second", the resolution of the timing equipment in 1932 was only 0.20 of a second, so the actual figure could have been anywhere between 0.25 and 0.65 seconds.
