= International Confederation of Revolver Enthusiasts =

- Jurisdiction: International
- Abbreviation: ICORE
- Founded: 1991

Official website
- icore.org

The International Confederation of Revolver Enthusiasts (ICORE) is an international community which promotes action shooting competitions with revolvers. ICORE was founded in 1991 by Mike and Sharon Higashi with a vision of revolver-only competitions where "even the most basic equipment could be used and still provide enjoyment and satisfaction."

The sport has elements from the Bianchi Cup, IPSC, and the Steel Challenge, and has active members in Australia, Canada, Germany, Italy, Malta and United States.

== Scoring ==
The scoring method used is Time-Plus Scoring, where the score is the time used by the competitor to complete the course plus time added or subtracted based on hits.

== Targets ==
Both paper targets and steel targets (falling and stationary) are used. The standard paper target is the NRA D-1 target which has 4 scoring areas.

== International Revolver Champions ==
The following is a list of previous and current Revolver World Champions.

Year	Division	Name	Nationality
1992	Open	Michael Plaxco	USA
1992	Stock	Mark Yardley	USA
1993	Open	Jerry Miculek	USA
1994	Open	Jerry Miculek	USA
1995	Open	Jerry Miculek	USA
1996	Open	Jerry Miculek	USA
1996	Stock	Mark Yardley	USA
1997	Open	Jerry Miculek	USA
1997	Stock	Mark Yardley	USA
1998	Open	Jerry Miculek	USA
1998	Stock	Mark Yardley	USA
1999	Open	Jerry Miculek	USA
1999	Stock	Jay Christen	USA
2000	Open	Jerry Miculek	USA
2000	Stock	Jason Pettitt	USA
2001	Open	Jerry Miculek	USA
2001	Stock	Angus Hobdell	UK
2002	Open	Jerry Miculek	USA
2002	Stock	Daniel Furbee	USA
2003	Open	Jerry Miculek	USA
2003	Limited	Jason Pettitt	USA
2004	Open	Jerry Miculek	USA
2004	Limited	Jason Pettitt	USA
2005	Open	Jerry Miculek	USA
2005	Limited	Jason Pettitt	USA
2006	Open	Jerry Miculek	USA
2006	Limited	Rob Leatham	USA
2007	Open	Jerry Miculek	USA
2007	Limited	Nils Jonasson	USA
2008	Open	Jerry Miculek	USA
2008	Limited	John Bagakis	USA
2009	Open	Jerry Miculek	USA
2009	Limited	John Bagakis	USA
2010	Open	Jerry Miculek	USA
2010	Limited	John Bagakis	USA
2011	Open	Jerry Miculek	USA
2011	Limited	John Bagakis	USA
2012	Open	Jerry Miculek	USA
2012	Limited	John Bagakis	USA
2012	Classic	Josh Lentz	USA
2013	Open	Jerry Miculek	USA
2013	Limited	John Bagakis	USA
2013	Classic	Josh Lentz	USA
2014	Open	Rich Wolfe	USA
2014	Limited	David Olhasso	USA
2014	Classic	Josh Lentz	USA
2015	Open	Rich Wolfe	USA
2015	Limited	David Olhasso	USA
2015	Classic	Josh Lentz	USA
2016	Open	Rich Wolfe	USA
2016	Limited	Michael Poggie	USA
2016	Limited 6	Shannon Smith	USA
2016	Classic	Josh Lentz	USA
2017	Open	Michael Poggie	USA
2017	Limited	David Olhasso	USA
2017	Limited 6	James Mcginty	USA
2017	Classic	Josh Lentz	USA
2018	Open	Michael Poggie	USA
2018	Limited	John Bagakis	USA
2018	Limited 6	James Mcginty	USA
2018	Classic	Josh Lentz	USA
2019	Open	Michael Poggie	USA
2019	Limited	Alexander Bakken	USA
2019	Limited 6	James Mcginty	USA
2019	Classic	Josh Lentz	USA

== See also ==
- List of shooting sports organizations
