= United States Practical Shooting Association =

National governing organization

- Abbreviation: USPSA
- Headquarters: Sedro Woolley, Washington
- Region served: United States
- Managing Director: Alan Turner
- Parent organization: International Practical Shooting Confederation
- Subsidiaries: Steel Challenge
- Website: uspsa.org

The United States Practical Shooting Association (USPSA) is the national governing body of practical shooting in the United States under the International Practical Shooting Confederation (IPSC). Its over 42,000 active members and over 500 affiliated clubs make USPSA the largest practical shooting organization in the United States and the second largest region within the IPSC after the Russian Federation of Practical Shooting. USPSA publishes a monthly member magazine called Front Sight.

== History ==
IPSC was formed in 1976 at a meeting in Columbia, Missouri, led by Jeff Cooper. It was here that the sport of Practical Shooting was formally established after years of independent efforts around the country to build upon the handgun skills and training for self-defense. The early days of the sport can be traced back to the 1950s and the quick draw "leather slap" competitions that grew out of America's love affair with the TV westerns of that era.

In 1984 USPSA was incorporated as the US Region of IPSC.

Practical Shooting challenged the then accepted standards of technique, training practices and equipment. Its early pioneers developed scenario-based competitions to accurately measure the effectiveness of their own shooting techniques and equipment. The rapid shooting on-the-move style of Practical Shooting gave birth to the term "Run and Gun" so commonly used today to describe the sport.

For more than 30 years the sport has served as the test bed for new products and the unofficial R&D for the firearms industry. With some competitors annually shooting in excess of 100,000 rounds, not many venues offer a better in-service assessment of a firearm's performance or the gauntlet of high-level competition through which a gun must survive to be declared reliable.

== Organization ==
USPSA is a 501c(3) non-profit Delaware corporation and currently headquartered in Sedro Woolley, Washington. The association is organized into 8 "Areas", each of which is represented by an Area Director at the board meetings of the organization. Further, each Area is divided into sections which is represented by a Section Coordinator responsible for coordinating the activities of clubs within his/ her section, and managing the nationals slot distribution process.

Besides IPSC, USPSA has its own international Foreign Club Affiliations (FCA) program to allow foreign USPSA members to earn a USPSA classification before competing in USPSA matches. FCA clubs and organizations at some point existed in 14 countries, and some are still affiliated.

=== Area states ===
The USPSA is divided into of eight areas, each area having several member states.

- Area 1: Alaska, Idaho, Montana, Nevada, Oregon, Utah, Washington, and Wyoming
- Area 2: Arizona, California, Colorado, Hawaii, and New Mexico
- Area 3: Iowa, Kansas, Minnesota, Missouri, North Dakota, Nebraska, and South Dakota
- Area 4: Arkansas, Louisiana, Oklahoma, and Texas
- Area 5: Illinois, Indiana, Kentucky, Michigan, Ohio, Wisconsin, and West Virginia
- Area 6: Alabama, Florida, Georgia, Mississippi, North Carolina, South Carolina, and Tennessee
- Area 7: Connecticut, Maine, Massachusetts, New Hampshire, New York, Rhode Island, and Vermont
- Area 8: District of Columbia, Delaware, Maryland, Pennsylvania, New Jersey, and Virginia

=== Board ===
The Board of Directors comprises the Director at large and the 8 Area Directors. Each member of the Board has an equal voice, with the president breaking any ties.

The Director at large is elected by all of the members to a 4-year term. Each Area Director is elected by the members in that Area to a three-year term. The Board of Directors' responsibilities include financial strategy, including budget, planning and investment strategies, membership recruitment and retention strategies, marketing strategies, strategies for the format and location of the USPSA Handgun Championship, USPSA Multigun Championship and IPSC US Handgun Championship matches, strategies for the establishment and/or management of relationships with other shooting organizations, including IPSC, drafting and revising the rules that USPSA matches are conducted under, and review and ratification of National Range Officer Institute (NROI) policies and procedures.

As of Aug. 2025, the Board is:

Title	Name
Director At Large	Daniel Click
Area 1 Director	Jim Boone
Area 2 Director	Tom Chesterman
Area 3 Director	Andrew Erickson
Area 4 Director	Alexander Acosta
Area 5 Director	Lafe Kunkel
Area 6 Director	Ben Berry
Area 7 Director	Frank Rizzi
Area 8 Director and Vice President	Russell Fortney

=== Managing directors ===
Title	Name
Managing Director	Alen Turner
Director of Media & Events	Jacob Martens
Regional Director	Leighton Oosthuisen
Director of Information Technology	Rick Brotzel
Director of NROI	Troy McManus

== Competitive divisions ==
As the governing body of IPSC shooting in the United States, USPSA provides a wide range of competitive opportunities for shooters with regulated competition in eight distinct divisions. Each division within USPSA is determined by the kind of firearm used and ranges from production guns, the "stock cars" of the sport, to fully customized open guns that are the Formula 1 cars of Practical Shooting. The following is an explanation of the eight divisions within USPSA.

=== Handgun ===
Although very similar, there are some equipment differences between the USPSA and IPSC handgun divisions. Both IPSC and USPSA Open require 9×19mm loaded to a power factor of 125 kgr·ft/s as the minimum caliber for minor scoring

Open

As its name implies, the Open Division allows for the greatest range of pistol and sight modification. Pistols used in Open division competition are the shooting sport equivalent to the Formula One race car. They are custom built with parts and features specifically designed for competition. The most notable modifications are the use of recoil compensators and red dot optical sighting systems. A normal Open division rig setup contains at least one 170 mm and four 140 mm magazines. The longer 170 mm magazines provide more capacity, but the shorter 140 mm magazines are also popular because of easier handling and often more reliable feeding, leaving the competitor a choice of equipment according to the stage at hand. Competitors may declare major scoring with a 9 mm (.354") or larger bullet, and the most popular cartridges in the Open division are the .38 Super and 9×19mm handloaded to major power factor. For a while USPSA de facto (but not by rule) prohibited 9×19mm from scoring major power factor in the Open Division due to too high pressures, but 9×19mm loaded to major became popular again as the power factor was relaxed from 175 kgr·ft/s to 160 kgr·ft/s, and later raised to 165 kgr·ft/s.

There are some differences between the IPSC and USPSA Handgun Open divisions regarding major power factor requirements and maximum magazine length rules. While IPSC Open still require the major power factor of 160 kgr·ft/s which was proposed by USPSA at the 1999 General Assembly, USPSA changed the major power factor of USPSA Open division to 165 kgr·ft/s the following year in 2000. Thus, the threshold for making major power factor is 165 kgr·ft/s in all USPSA handgun divisions, while IPSC separates its power factor requirements into 160 kgr·ft/s for Open and 170 kgr·ft/s for all other all other handgun divisions.

While IPSC Open limits the magazine length to 170 mm (approximately 6.69 inches), USPSA Open changed the maximum magazine length from 170 mm to 171.25 mm (6.742 inches) somewhere between 2004 and 2009. Confusingly, some 171.25 mm magazine setups are marketed and referred to as 170 mm while they in reality measure 171.25 mm, making their configuration illegal for IPSC competitions. Since the magazine tubes themselves always are shorter than 170 mm, the overall magazine length will be dependent on the particular basepad used. I.e. using a 167 mm long magazine tube with a 3 mm basepad would yield an overall length of 170 mm making its configuration approved for international competition, while a 167 mm magazine tube with a 4 mm basepad would yield an overall length of 171 mm making it restricted to USPSA matches only. Adding to the confusion, some manufacturers lists their magazine tube length as the length of the tube itself, while others lists the length with a basepad assembled.

For a 2011 pattern handgun, aftermarket parts and magazine can give a magazine capacity of 29 rounds (reloadable) of 9×19mm for a 171.25 mm USPSA Open magazine (28 rounds for a shorter 170 mm IPSC Open magazine), or up to 26 rounds of .40 S&W for a 171.25 mm USPSA Open magazine, although the .40 S&W caliber is less commonly used in Open.

Limited

Most modifications are permitted in Limited division except optical sights or compensators. Although most handguns can be used for Limited, some popular choices are the 2011 frame STI and SVI pistols. Competitors can make various modifications such as change sights, grips, slide stops, magazine releases and mainspring housings.

Limited is often thought of as the USPSA equivalent of the IPSC Standard division, but there are some differences. In Limited division there is no restriction on holster position, while in the Standard division the holster and allied equipment must be worn behind the hip bone. While Standard handguns must fit inside the IPSC box with any of its magazines inserted, there is no box for Limited division and instead there is a restriction on magazine length of 141.25 mm for double stack magazines (5.561 inches, which is often incorrectly referred to as 140 mm magazines) or 171.25 mm for single stack magazines (6.742 inches) (often incorrectly referred to as 170 mm magazines). The maximum magazine length in Limited was changed from 140 and 170 mm to 141.25 and 171.25 mm respectively by USPSA somewhere between 2004 and 2009. On the other hand, if for instance a 2011 pattern pistol is used in the Standard division, either 124 or 126 mm magazines will usually give the maximum capacity and still fit the box.

Minimum caliber for minor scoring is 9×19mm loaded to a power factor of 125 kgr·ft/s while minimum caliber for major scoring is a 10 mm (.40") cartridge loaded to a power factor of 165 kgr·ft/s, making for an interesting choice between minor and major scoring taken in mind the differences in recoil, magazine capacity and scoring points. An example of differences in magazine capacity depending on caliber can be seen when comparing stock 141.25 mm STI 2011 double stack magazines, which according to the manufacturer yields a capacity of either 14 rounds for .45 ACP, 17 rounds for .40 S&W or 20 rounds for 9×19mm. Magazine capacity can be further increased using aftermarket springs, followers and basepads as long as each magazine still fits the 141.25 mm gauge. For a 2011 pattern handgun, aftermarket parts and magazine tuning can increase the (reloadable) capacity from 14 to 18 rounds for .45 ACP, from 17 to 21 rounds for .40 S&W and from 20 to 24 rounds for 9×19mm.

The power factors for Limited and Standard also differ. For both Limited and Standard, the minimum caliber for minor scoring is 9×19mm loaded to a power factor of 125 kgr·ft/s, and both require a minimum caliber of 10 mm (.40") for major scoring. However, while IPSC Standard still require the major power factor of 170 kgr·ft/s which was proposed by USPSA at the 1999 General Assembly, the following year in 2000 USPSA changed the major power factor of its Limited division to 165 kgr·ft/s.

Limited-10

Limited-10 is very similar to the Limited division, except that (as the name implies) the competitor can only load a maximum of 10 rounds per magazine. The division was developed in response to the 1994 Crime Bill, and eliminates any capacity advantage pistols with pre-ban magazines would have had over those with post-ban magazines. Although the federal ban sunset in 2004, the Limited-10 division still enjoys some populariry in the few states that has continued to place restrictions on 10 rounds per magazine.

Although most handguns can be used as long as they have no compensator or optic, the same equipment which is used in Limited is also popular in Limited-10. Like in Limited, double stack handguns can have a magazine length of 141.25 mm and single stack handguns (i.e. the 1911) can be used with 171.25 mm magazines. However double-stack pistols like the 2011 seem to be preferred over single stack models due to easier mag changes, and single stack handguns are therefore naturally more competitive in the Single Stack Division where they compete against other single stack handguns. As with Limited, shooters must use a 10 mm caliber or larger bullet in order to score a major power factor.

Production

Production Division is strictly limited to the use of production handguns with actions that are either double-action-only (DAO), double-action/ single-action (DA/ SA) or striker fired. These are the "duty guns" available from nearly every pistol maker and each of the major manufacturers offers a wide variety of models that meet IPSC or USPSA Production Division requirements. Stock revolvers may also be used, including the 7- and 8-shot variants.

Since everyone in the division is scored as a minor power factor regardless of the round, mostly 9×19mm handguns are used. While capacity is not uniform across model, caliber or manufacture, the playing field is leveled by limiting shooters to 15 rounds per magazine. Holsters must be "Suitable for everyday use", defined as holsters which are not manufactured or cut lower than, and must cover the slide up to, 1/2" below the ejection port. Most shooters use a standard outside-the-waistband holster often made of Kydex or plastic, attached to a dropped-and-offset aluminum or steel mount.

Both the IPSC and USPSA Production rules were originally restrictive in regards to permitted modifications, custom parts and tuning, but while IPSC has stayed very restrictive on its interpretations, USPSA have loosened up on its interpretations of the rules. Therefore, many handguns approved for USPSA can not be used in their configuration for IPSC competitions.

There are several differences between USPSA Production and IPSC Production:

- The approved lists of USPSA and IPSC contain different models.
- While IPSC greatly restricts the level of modifications that can be performed on a Production gun, USPSA allows internal modifications and provides a comprehensive list of permitted modifications such as trigger jobs and aftermarket hammers.
- USPSA do not allow race holsters, while they are allowed in IPSC.
- In USPSA the handgun must fit inside an own "Production box" with dimensions 8 15/16 x 6 x 1 5/8" (tolerance +1/16", -0"), (approximately 227.01 x 152.40 x 41.28 mm) with any of its empty magazines inserted (formerly the IPSC box was used for USPSA Production, measuring 225 x 150 x 45 mm). On the other hand, IPSC has no restrictions on handgun size in the Production division, except of a maximum barrel length of 127 mm (5 inches).

Carry Optics

Carry Optics is essentially for "production" type handguns with red dot sights attached to the slide between the rear of slide and the ejection port. Like USPSA Production there is minor scoring only. Carry Optics was introduced by USPSA in July 2015, and competitors could participate in the division from mid September 2015. Initially the maximum weight limit was 35 ounces (approximately 992 grams) including an empty magazine, but in 2016 the maximum weight limit was raised to 45 ounces (approximately 1275 grams) including an empty magazine. In March 2021, the weight limit was again increased to 59 ounces, allowing essentially all Production handguns, even with modifications that increase weight, such as flashlights and brass grips. Initially there was a 10-round magazine capacity limit, but from 1 February 2017 the magazine capacity limit was raised to any magazine that can fit a 140 mm USPSA gauge (measuring 141.25 mm)

Single Stack

The USPSA Single Stack Division (short "SS") caters to the traditional 1911 fan, and its IPSC equivalent is the Classic division. USPSA introduced Single Stack as a provisional division under the name "1911 Single Stack" in 2006 and made it a regular division in 2008 under the name "Single Stack". Only single-stack model 1911-pattern pistols are allowed in this division, and they must comply with a maximum weight limit, as well as fit fully within a box of specific dimensions. The equipment rules are similar to Production Division, other than providing for 8 rounds for major calibers and 10 rounds for minor. As for holsters, Single Stack shooters must adhere to guidelines similar to the Production Division. The holster must be a practical, non-race style.

Revolver

The Revolver Division is intended for revolvers and shooters must reload after six rounds if shooting Major power factor or after eight rounds if shooting Minor power factor. Modifications are limited, and prohibited modifications are optical sights, porting and recoil compensators. However, shooters may change grips, enlarge the cylinder release, bob the hammer, change sights, chamfer cylinders and tune the action as they desire. The most popular calibers are 9x19, .38 Super, and the .38 Colt family from which .38 Special was derived. Cylinders cut for moonclips are de facto standard as well. Typically, competitors will use a "race" style holster in the Revolver Division.

Pistol Caliber Carbine (PCC)

The PCC division gives the possibility to compete with a carbine in handgun matches. There is only minor power factor scoring, and the only permitted calibers are 9×19mm, .357 Sig, 40 S&W, 10 mm and .45 ACP. A muzzle brake and any optical sight(s) are permitted. Since no "holster" could be practically used for a carbine, cold range rules are respected via the use of a chamber flag, and the muzzle of the carbine must be pointed reasonably vertical until the "Make Ready" command is given.

=== Rifle ===
The minimum caliber in USPSA Rifle is 5.45×39mm, and the ammunition has to make a power factor of 150 kgr·ft/s for minor or 320 kgr·ft/s for major scoring. Important elements include the use of prone, off hand and supported shooting positions. Knowledge of the firearms ballistics is a key element to succeed at the long range targets. There are some differences between the USPSA and IPSC Rifle divisions.

Open

In the open division one can have any number of many optical sights and bipods, and there is no size restriction on muzzle brakes. 1-4 or 1-6 scopes are popular in the Open division. Some use reticles with marked hold overs, while others prefer reticles with a simple dot and crosshair and choose to dial long range adjustments on the turrets instead.

Tactical

The Tactical division is very similar to the open division, with the exception that only one optical sight is permitted, no bipod and the muzzle brake has to be within the maximum dimensions of 1x3 inches (1 inch diameter and 3 inches long).

Limited

The limited division is limited to one non-magnifying red dot sight, no bipod and the muzzle brake has to be within the maximum dimensions of 1x3 inches (1 inch diameter and 3 inches long). Rifles with non-magnified red dot sights are very competitive with scoped rifle at short ranges, but have a disadvantage at longer ranges.

=== Shotgun ===
Different options on shotgun chokes and ammunition (from different pellets sizes and up to slugs) makes for interesting choke and ammunition choices based on the stage at hand.

Like IPSC Shotgun, the minimum caliber for shotguns are 20 gauge in the Open, Limited and Tactical divisions, only the Heavy Metal division is unique in that it requires a 12 gauge pump-action shotgun.

Open

The Open division allows optical sights, muzzle brakes, and detachable magazines or the use of speed loaders for internal magazines. Magazines must not contain more than 10 rounds at the start signal. Bipods are also permitted, and the shotgun does not have to be factory produced.

Limited/Tactical

The Limited/ Tactical division is restricted to iron sights only, tube magazines and the shotgun has to be factory produced of at least 500 units. The magazine capacity limit at the start signal is 9 rounds. Speed loaders are not permitted, neither are muzzle brakes or optical sights. The USPSA Limited division is very similar to the IPSC Modified division.

Heavy Metal

The Heavy Metal division requires a 12 gauge pump-action shotgun with a tube magazine, and the shotgun has to be factory produced of at least 500 units. The magazine capacity limit at the start signal is 9 rounds. Speed loaders are not permitted, neither are muzzle brakes or optical sights. The USPSA Heavy Metal division is practically identical to the IPSC Standard Manual division.

=== Multigun ===
In Multigun, equipment from the handgun, rifle and shotgun divisions are combined into own Multigun Divisions.

Open Division

- Open division handgun
- Open division rifle
- Open division shotgun

Tactical Division

- Limited division handgun
- Tactical division rifle
- Tactical division shotgun

Limited Division

- Limited division handgun
- Limited division rifle
- Limited division shotgun

Heavy Metal Tactical Division

- Limited 10 division handgun in major caliber
- Iron sighted rifle in major caliber
- Heavy Metal shotgun

Heavy Metal Limited Division

- Limited 10 handgun in minimum .429" caliber (≈ 10.9 mm), e.g. .44 Special or .45 ACP.
- Iron sighted rifle in major caliber
- Heavy Metal shotgun

== Scoring ==
Mainly two methods are used, either Comstock or Time Plus. The shooter's time is recorded electronically, by means of a shot timer that detects the sound of the shots.

Comstock ranks the competitors based on achieved points for a stage divided by their time, giving them a hit factor ("points per second"). The points are added based on which scoring zones the hits are in and the competitors declared power factor (minor or major), with penalties subtracted, before dividing by the time the competitor used on the stage. The highest hit factor wins the stage and gets the full total of Stage Points for that stage, while a percentage of the total available Stage Points are awarded to the other competitors based on their percentage hit factor compared to the winner. To calculate the final match standings each competitors stage points are totaled, and the competitor with the highest total of points wins the match. Comparing each shooter directly to the performance of the top shooter on each stage allows for precise gradation of performance across a match, but requires a computer and software to do in a timely fashion. Comstock is the only scoring method used internationally by the IPSC.

Time Plus is a newer scoring method that has seen a rising popularity in Multi Gun matches because of its simplicity. Minor and major power factor is ignored, and only two hits anywhere on the targets are required (no points or scoring zones). The competitors' time is their score, and instead time is added for misses, penalties etc. This scoring method is faster, but has the drawback that if a competitor makes a time-consuming error on a stage they may drop severely in the match classification because the time scoring is cumulative.

Other scoring methods are Limited Time Comstock, Virginia Count or Fixed Time.

== Competitor ranking / classifications system ==
The USPSA ranks its shooters in classes, according to their performance on classifier stages. The ranks are:

Rank	Percent
Grand Master	95-100%
Master	85-94.9%
A	75-84.9%
B	60-74.9%
C	40-59.9%
D	2-40%

== Match personnel ==
In conjunction with IPSC, USPSA has their own dedicated range officials, which is run by the National Range Officers Institute (NROI). The NROI is responsible for the training and certification of the Range Officials, firearm safety, good course design and advising the membership on the application of the rules as determined by the board of directors. USPSA has four different types of Range Officials, which are:

1. Range Officer (RO)
2. Chief Range Officer (CRO)
3. Range Master (RM)
4. Range Master Instructor (RMI)

== USPSA purchases Steel Challenge ==
In December 2007, USPSA purchased the Steel Challenge and the Steel Challenge Shooting Association (SCSA) from owners and creators Mike Dalton and Mike Fichman.

The match design of Dalton and Fichman called for simple stages, or courses of fire, made up of just five steel plates. The steel plates are of differing sizes and placed at various distances and angles to create a variety of challenges. The shooter assumes his or her position in the shooting box and, upon the beep of the timer, draw their pistol and shoots each plate with the fifth being a stop plate synchronized to the timer. Each shooter shoots the stage five times with the slowest time dropped. The score is the combined time of the best four runs and that time added to the combined times of the other stages for a final match score.

In 2007, more than 220 shooters competed for over $390,000 in cash and prizes. The match was held every year in Piru, California until 2012 when it was moved to Frostproof, Florida.

== See also ==
- USPSA Multigun Championship
- USPSA Handgun Championship
- IPSC US Handgun Championship
- USPSA Asia Pacific Championship
- IPSC Handgun World Shoot
- IPSC Rifle World Shoot
- IPSC Shotgun World Shoot

=== Arranging USPSA matches ===
- PractiScore – The official scoring program for USPSA.
