= Jarkko Laukia =

Finnish sport shooter

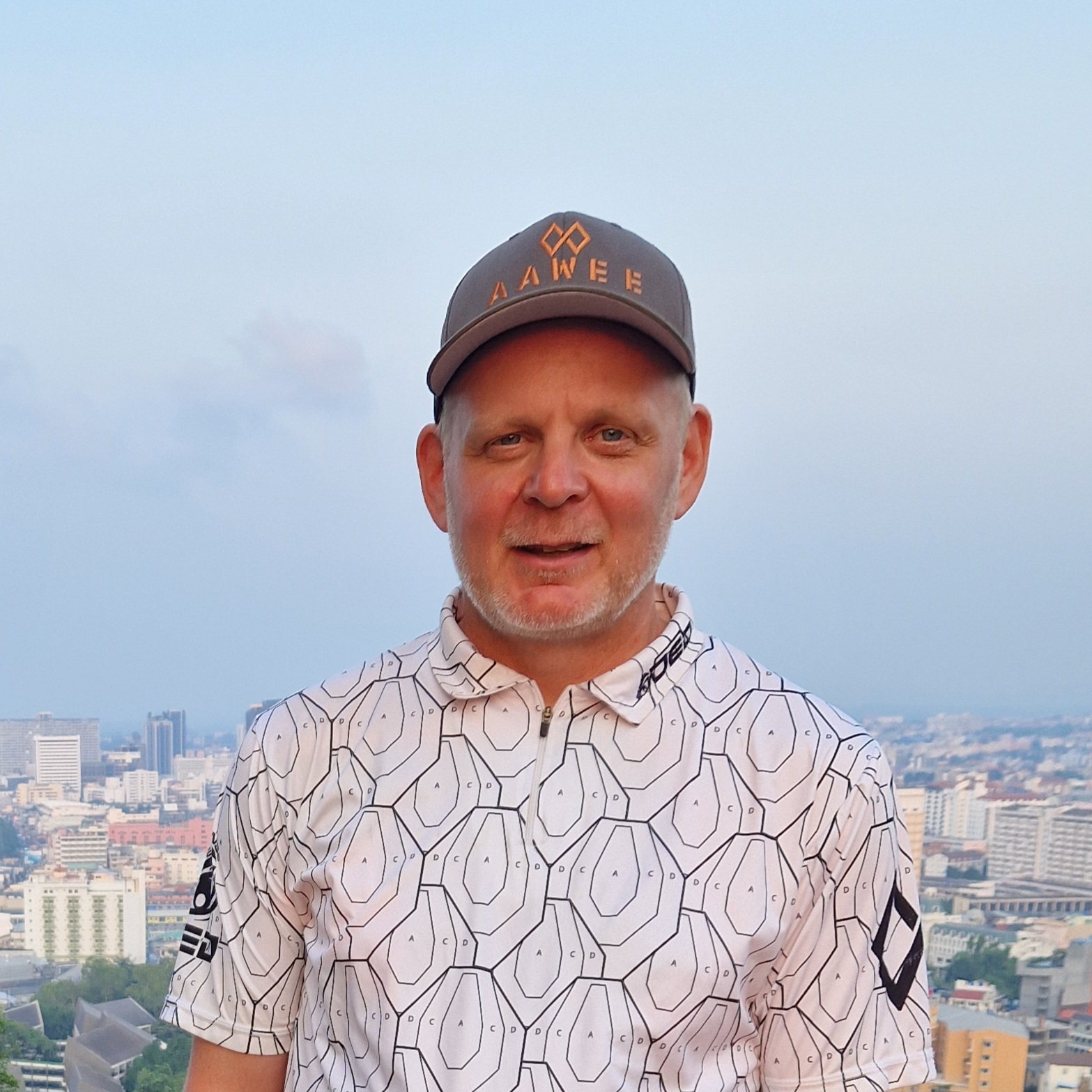
Medal record
IPSC
Representing Finland
IPSC Rifle World Shoots
Silver medal – second place	2024 Finland	Open Senior
Gold medal – first place	2019 Sweden	Open
Bronze medal – third place	2017 Russia	Open
IPSC European Rifle Championship
Bronze medal – third place	2012 Bulgaria	Open
Bronze medal – third place	2015 Hungary	Open
IPSC Nordic Rifle Championship
Silver medal – second place	2011 Denmark	Open
Gold medal – first place	2012 Sweden	Open
Gold medal – first place	2013 Norway	Open
Silver medal – second place	2014 Finland	Open
Gold medal – first place	2015 Denmark	Open
Gold medal – first place	2017 Sweden	Open
Gold medal – first place	2018 Finland	Open
Gold medal – first place	2022 Denmark	Open
Silver medal – second place	2023 Finland	Open
Bronze medal – third place	2024 Norway	Open
IPSC Finnish Rifle Championship
Gold medal – first place	2013 Hamina	Open
Gold medal – first place	2016 Mikkeli	Open
Gold medal – first place	2021 Syndalen	Open
Gold medal – first place	2022 Heinola	Open
Gold medal – first place	2023 Syndalen	Open
IPSC Shotgun World Shoots
Gold medal – first place	2018 France	Standard
Gold medal – first place	2023 Thailand	Standard Senior
IPSC Europen Shotgun Championship
Silver medal – second place	2025 Hungary	modified
IPSC Nordic Shotgun Championship
Silver medal – second place	2013 Loimaa	Standard
Gold medal – first place	2016 Loimaa	Standard
IPSC Finnish Shotgun Championship
Silver medal – second place	2010 Mikkeli	Standard
Silver medal – second place	2011 Loimaa	Standard
Silver medal – second place	2012 Loimaa	Standard
Gold medal – first place	2013 Loimaa	Standard
Bronze medal – third place	2014 Loimaa	Standard
Gold medal – first place	2015 Sipoo	Standard
Gold medal – first place	2016 Kirkkonummi	Standard
Gold medal – first place	2020 Pori	Standard
Silver medal – second place	2021 Loimaa	Modified
Silver medal – second place	2022 Vaasa	Standard
Bronze medal – third place	2023 Pori	Standard
IPSC Finnish Tournament Championship
Silver medal – second place	2010	Practical
Gold medal – first place	2011	Practical
Gold medal – first place	2012	Practical
Gold medal – first place	2014	Practical
Gold medal – first place	2018	Practical
Gold medal – first place	2021	Modified
IPSC Finnish Mini Rifle Championship
Gold medal – first place	2013 Turku	Open
Gold medal – first place	2014 Sipoo	Open
Gold medal – first place	2015 Loimaa	Open
Gold medal – first place	2016 Sipoo	Open
Gold medal – first place	2020 Nokia	Open
Gold medal – first place	2021 Sipoo	Open
Gold medal – first place	2022 Suomussalmi	Open
Silver medal – second place	2024 Suomussalmi	Open
IPSC PCC World Shoot
Silver medal – second place	2025 Czech Republic	PCC Open Senior
IPSC Finnish PCC Championship
Silver medal – second place	2020 Vaasa
Gold medal – first place	2021 Mikkeli

Jarkko Laukia is a Finnish sport shooter who won the 2019 IPSC Rifle World Shoot Open division title and 2018 IPSC Shotgun World Shoot Standard division title. Laukia has dozens of Finnish championships titles from different IPSC Divisions, 8 time Steel Challenge Finnish Champion and 7 Finnish championships title from SRA-shooting. Laukia has won over 100 President's Medals from Level 3 to Level 5 IPSC competitions.

== See also ==
- Raine Peltokoski, Finnish sport shooter
- Sami Hautamäki, Finnish sport shooter
- Josh Froelich, American sport shooter
- Roberto Vezzoli, Italian sport shooter
