= 2019 IPSC Rifle World Shoot =

International sport shooting competition

Coordinates: 59.2898°N 14.7039°E

- Official logo of the 2019 IPSC Rifle World Shoot
- Venue: Villingsberg Training Area
- Location: Karlskoga, Sweden
- Dates: Opening Ceremony: 3 Aug; Main Match: 4-9 Aug; Shoot-Off: 10 Aug; Closing Ceremony: 10 Aug
- Competitors: 669 from 37 nations

Medalists
gold medal	Open (Largest Division) (Finland) Jarkko Laukia
silver medal	(Finland) Raine Peltokoski
bronze medal	(Russia) Vadim Mikhailov

The 2019 IPSC Rifle World Shoot II was held in Karlskoga, Sweden between 3 and 10 August. The match consisted of 30 stages over six days, and over 650 competitors Jarkko Laukia from Finland took gold in the Open division, which was the largest division of the match.

== History ==
Originally, the 2018 IPSC European Rifle Championship was to be held in Karlskoga in the summer of 2018, but had to be postponed to 2019 due to the 2018 Sweden wildfires. After an application to the international association for practical shooting, the Match Category was upgraded to a World Championship, making the match one of the largest shooting competitions ever held in Sweden. The match had a capacity of approximately 750 competitors.

Karlskoga is known for being the home town of Nobel Prize founder Alfred Nobel. The venue of the match, Villingsberg Training Area (Villingsbergs skjutfält), is owned by the Swedish Armed Forces, and the yearly Swedish Defence Forces' Practical Rifle Championship was also held in conjunction with the World Championship.

The match had stable weather conditions.

== Results ==
=== Open ===
The Semi Auto Open division had the largest match participation with 531 registered competitors (79.4 %). Jarkko Laukia from Finland won the Open division after having worked up a solid lead early in the match. Laukia was one of the favorites before the championship along with his experienced Finnish teammate and reigning European champion Raine Peltokoski and reigning world champion Teemu Rintala. Peltokoski managed to close in much of Laukia's lead during the final day of shooting and finished second place at 98.57%. Third place was taken by Vadim Mikhailov from Russia at 94.62%, passing reigning champion Teemu Rintala who ended up in fourth with 94.41% (0.21% behind Vadim).

Individual

Overall	Competitor	Points	Overall Match Percent	
Gold	(Finland) Jarkko Laukia	2378.8940	100.00%	
Silver	(Finland) Raine Peltokoski	2344.9589	98.57%	
Bronze	(Russia) Vadim Mikhailov	2251.0231	94.62%	
4th	(Finland) Teemu Rintala	2245.9468	94.41%	
5th	(Sweden) Olle Ackehed	2225.5517	93.55%	
6th	(United States) Tim Yackley	2197.6912	92.38%	
7th	(Sweden) Marcus Madsen	2197.1548	92.36%	
8th	(United States) Kyle Litzie	2189.1600	92.02%	
9th	(Estonia) Dagnis Maiberg	2168.2678	91.15%	
10th	(Norway) Eirik Johannes Larsen	2156.5641	90.65%	
Lady	Competitor	Points	Overall percent	Category percent
Gold	(United States) Ashley Rheuark	1883.7501	79.19%	100.00%
Silver	(United States) Lena Miculek	1852.5786	77.88%	98.35%
Bronze	(United States) Lanny Barnes	1683.8957	70.78%	89.39%
Junior	Competitor	Points	Overall percent	Category percent
Gold	(United States) Riley Kropff	1907.8355	80.20%	100.00%
Silver	(Russia) Dmitry Novikov	1664.8075	69.98%	87.26%
Bronze	(Russia) Georgy Shkoda	1568.8428	65.95%	82.23%
Senior	Competitor	Points	Overall percent	Category percent
Gold	(Slovakia) Ernest Nagy	2063.4535	86.74%	100.00%
Silver	(United States) Jose Vidanes	1837.6288	77.25%	89.06%
Bronze	(Italy) Dario Forlani	1821.1013	76.55%	88.26%
Super Senior	Competitor	Points	Overall percent	Category percent
Gold	(United States) Jerry Miculek	1884.2530	80.35%	100.00%
Silver	(Finland) Pertti Karhunen	1700.5142	72.52%	90.25%
Bronze	(Finland) Ilkka Kervinen	1515.7852	64.64%	80.44%

Teams Open

Overall	Country	Points	Percent	Team members
Gold	Finland		100.00%	Jarkko Laukia, Raine Peltokoski, Teemu Rintala, Kim Leppänen
Silver	United States		%	Tim Yackley, Scott Greene, Joseph Farewell, Brian Nelson
Bronze	Russia		%	Oleg Kovalev, Vadim Mikhailov, Gleb Svatikov, Ivan Ivanov

=== Standard ===
The iron sighted Standard division had the second largest match participation with 97 registered competitors (14.5 %). Sami Hautamäki won Standard with a decisive margin of near nine percent down to the next Standard competitor. In the unofficial Combined Scoring Across all Divisions, this would have put Sami at an impressive 22nd place with 86.07% of Open division winner Jarkko Laukia. The fight for the remaining podium places was a close race until the end, and ended with Joseph Easter from USA taking second place at 91.08%, while reigning champion Håvard Østgaard from Norway took third place at 90.16% of the winning score, only 0.9% behind second place.

Individual

Overall	Competitor	Points	Overall Match Percent	
Gold	(Finland) Sami Hautamäki	2510.4513	100.00%	
Silver	(United States) Joseph Easter	2286.4597	91.08%	
Bronze	(Norway) Håvard Østgaard	2263.5465	90.16%	
4th	(Norway) Kenneth Handberg	2250.4614	89.64%	
5th	(Estonia) Madis Reier	2165.4857	86.26%	
6th	(Russia) Arseniy Denisov	2129.4978	84.83%	
7th	(Finland) Atte Vainionpää	2118.8657	84.40%	
8th	(United States) Kelly Neal	2111.3216	84.10%	
9th	(Russia) Evigeniy Kalinin	2066.8526	82.33%	
10th	(Russia) Alan Alborov	2062.6652	82.16%	
Senior	Competitor	Points	Overall percent	Category percent
Gold	(United States) Kelly Neal	2111.3216	84.10%	100.00%
Silver	(Finland) Ilkka Siitonen	2055.2132	81.87%	97.34%
Bronze	(Russia) Vitaly Konev	1890.8888	75.32%	89.56%

=== Manual Open ===
The Manual Action Open division had the third largest match participation with 29 registered competitors (4.3 %). A triple Swedish win in the Manual Open individual classification was ensured by Swedish shooters Jiro Nihei, Stilianos Simeonidis and Erik Bjälkvall The Manual Open division was a close race until the last days of the match, and the top 5 being competitors finished within about 2.3% of each other. The Swedish team, consisting of the three plus Dan Liljeström, also took gold in the Manual team classification.

Individual

Overall	Competitor	Points	Overall Match Percent	
Gold	(Sweden) Jiro Nihei	1313.1260	100.00%	
Silver	(Sweden) Stilianos Simeonidis	1308.7920	99.67%	
Bronze	(Sweden) Erik Bjälkvall	1301.1866	99.09%	
4th	(Italy) Paolo Zambai	1290.3569	98.27%	
5th	(Russia) Aleksandr Ivashko	1283.2123	97.72%	
6th	(Sweden) Dan Liljeström	1233.9990	93.97%	
7th	(Italy) Samuele Luca Conte	1172.7674	89.31%	
8th	(Finland) Vesa Kaunisto	1170.6188	89.15%	
9th	(Russia) Oleg Perfilev	1159.3707	88.29%	
10th	(Sweden) Fredrik Lindblad	1068.9674	81.41%	
Senior	Competitor	Points	Overall percent	Category percent
Gold	(Italy) Paolo Zambai	1290.3569	98.27%	100.00%
Silver	(Russia) Aleksandr Ivashko	1283.2123	97.72%	99.45%
Bronze	(Sweden) Dan Liljeström	1233.9990	93.97%	95.63%

=== Manual Standard ===
The Manual Action Standard division had 12 registered competitors (1.8 %).

Individual

Overall	Competitor	Points	Overall Match Percent
Gold	(Russia) Vladimir Chamyan	1362.4478	100.00%
Silver	(Russia) Vladimir Yakovlev	1233.3168	90.52%
Bronze	(Russia) Andrei Kirisenko	1206.7647	88.57%
4th	(Russia) Konstantin Khatkovskiy	1154.6125	84.75%
5th	(Russia) Ramazan Mubarakov	1095.4781	69.78%
6th	(Mongolia) Enkhbaatar Dorjpagma	950.7752	69.78%
7th	(Russia) Alexey Romanov	933.7079	68.53%
8th	(Mongolia) Gantulga Dontor	769.0968	56.45%
9th	(Greece) Fanourios Sifakis	747.0379	54.83%
10th	(Russia) Alexey Terebenin	745.0130	54.68%

== Shoot-Off side event ==
The shoot-off side event is an audience friendly one-against-one elimination cup held on 10 August, the day after the Main Match was finished. The top 8 overall finishing athletes from the Main Match as well as the top 8 category athletes in each division were eligible for qualification.

The Shoot-Off was broadcast live online on Facebook, and was recorded by Sveriges Television, the Swedish national public television broadcaster.

Division	Category	Gold	Silver	Bronze
Open	Overall	(Sweden) Olle Ackehed		
Open	Lady	(United States) Lena Miculek		
Open	Junior	(United States) Riley Kropff		
Open	Senior	(Russia) Georgy Shkoda		
Open	Super Senior	(United States) Jerry Miculek		
Standard	Overall	(Norway) Kenneth Handberg		
Standard	Senior	(United States) Kelly Neal		
Manual Open	Overall	(Russia) Aleksandr Ivashko		
Manual Open	Senior	(Sweden) Dan Liljeström		
Manual Standard	Overall	(Russia) Vladimir Yakovlev		

== See also ==
- IPSC Rifle World Shoots
- IPSC Shotgun World Shoot
- IPSC Handgun World Shoots
- IPSC Action Air World Shoot
