= Jiro Nihei =

Jiro Igor Nihei
- Born: 9 March 1971 (age 55) Stockholm, Sweden
- Height: 172 cm (5 ft 8 in)
- Weight: 75 kg (165 lb; 11 st 11 lb)
- Position: Goaltender
- Played for: AIK IF, Djurgårdens IF; Nippon Paper Cranes
- National team: Japan
- Playing career: 1988-1989–2006-2007
Medal record
IPSC
Representing Sweden
IPSC Rifle World Shoot
Gold medal – first place	2019 Karlskoga	Manual
IPSC Nordic Rifle Championship
Gold medal – first place	2017 Karlskoga	Manual

Jiro Nihei (born 9 March 1971 in Stockholm, Sweden) is a practical shooter and former professional ice hockey goaltender. In 2019, Jiro Nihei took gold in the Manual Open division at the 2019 IPSC Rifle World Shoot. In 2017 he took Gold in the Manual division at the Nordic Rifle Championship. He has also been competing in the IPSC Production handgun division.

His professional ice hockey career began in 1988 playing for AIK IF in the Swedish Hockey League. He then mainly played in the Swedish Division 2 until 2001 when he again played in the top Swedish Hockey League, this time for Djurgårdens IF. Jiro went on playing in the Asia League for the Japanese Cranes Team.

Jiro has also participated in various international competitions with the Japanese National Hockey Team. For example, he was on the Japanese U20 Team in the 1989–1990 season and was on the Japanese national team at the 1998 Ice Hockey World Championship. Notably, he played for Japan against Finland and the Czech Republic at the 2004 IIHF World Championship.

Jiro's twin brother Taro has also played ice hockey professionally as a forward. Their father is Japanese and mother Finnish.

== See also ==
- Jarkko Laukia, Finnish sport shooter
- Raine Peltokoski, Finnish sport shooter
- Tatsuya Sakai, Japanese sport shooter
