= Sodnomzhamtsyn Dashdemberel =

Mongolian sports shooter

Personal information
- Nationality: Mongolian

Sport
- Sport: Practical shooting
Medal record
Men's Practical shooting
Representing Mongolia
IPSC World championships
| Gold medal – first place | 2024 Oulu | Individual |
| Gold medal – first place | 2024 Oulu | Team |

Sodnomzhamtsyn Dashdemberel (Mongolian: Содномжамцын Дашдэмбэрэл) is a Mongolian sport shooter. Dashdemberel held an individual and team winner title in the men's rifle of the Manual Action Bolt Open division at the 2024 IPSC World championships in Oulu, the Republic of Finland.
