= Hunter Cayll =

American sport shooter

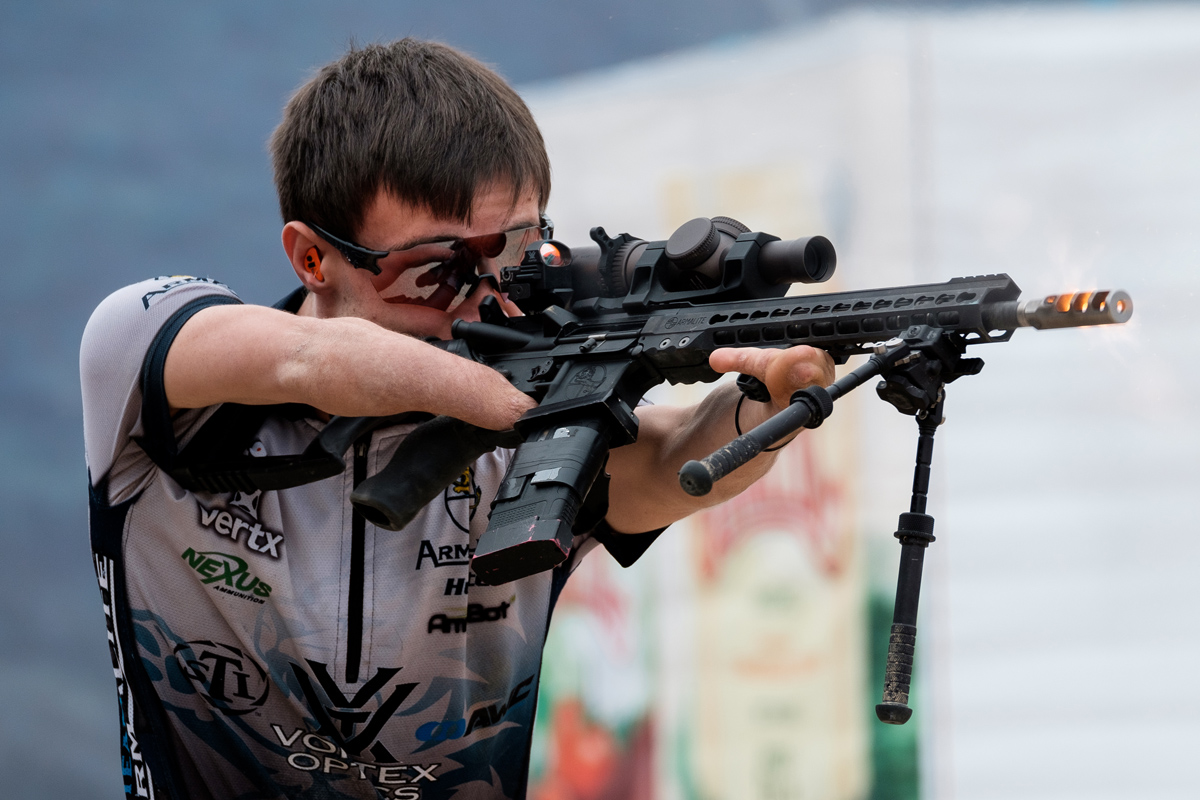
- Hunter Cayll at the 2017 IPSC Rifle World Shoot in Moscow, Russia

Personal information
- Born: 5 February 1995 (age 31) Lawrenceburg, Tennessee, US

Hunter "Nubs" Cayll (born 5 February 1995) is an American amateur competitive shooter born with malformations on all four limbs:

- On his left arm, he has Complete Aphalangia, meaning he was born without Phalanges (finger bones) but with Metacarpals (palm bones) and Carpals (wrist bones);
  - His single digit is the result of a second toe-to-hand transplantation at a young age.
- On his right arm, he has Partial Hemimelia, meaning he was born without the lower half of the lower arm;
- He also has significant bilateral clubfoot and unequal leg length; he had surgeries done on him to correct his lower limbs as best as possible.

Hunter first started competing in Multi-Gun, and participated in the Open division at the 2015 IPSC Shotgun World Shoot in Agna, Italy and the 2017 IPSC Rifle World Shoot in Moscow, Russia.
