= Vidanes =

Vidanes is a surname. Notable people with the surname include:

- Bobet Vidanes (born 1965), Filipino television director
- Cory Vidanes (born 1962), Filipina executive
- Jojo Vidanes, American sport shooter
