= IPSC Finnish Rifle Championship =

Sport shooting competition in Finland

The IPSC Finnish Rifle Championship is an IPSC level 3 championship held once a year by the Finnish Shooting Sport Federation.

== Champions ==
The following is a list of current and previous champions.

=== Overall category ===
Year	Division	Gold	Silver	Bronze	Venue
1996	Open	(Finland)	(Finland)	(Finland)	
1996	Standard	(Finland)	(Finland)	(Finland)	
1997	Open	(Finland)	(Finland)	(Finland)	
1997	Standard	(Finland)	(Finland)	(Finland)	
1998	Open	(Finland)	(Finland)	(Finland)	
1998	Standard	(Finland)	(Finland)	(Finland)	
1999	Open	(Finland)	(Finland)	(Finland)	
1999	Standard	(Finland)	(Finland)	(Finland)	
2000	Open	(Finland)	(Finland)	(Finland)	
2000	Standard	(Finland)	(Finland)	(Finland)	
2001	Open	(Finland)	(Finland)	(Finland)	
2001	Standard	(Finland)	(Finland)	(Finland)	
2002	Open	(Finland)	(Finland)	(Finland)	
2002	Standard	(Finland)	(Finland)	(Finland)	
2003	Open	(Finland)	(Finland)	(Finland)	
2003	Standard	(Finland)	(Finland)	(Finland)	
2004	Open	(Finland) Tommi Forsell	(Finland) Mikael Kaislaranta	(Finland) Petri H Runtti	
2004	Standard	(Finland) Marko Kervola	(Finland) Jari Karvonen	(Finland) Jukka Leikos	
2005	Open	(Finland) Petri H Runtti	(Finland) Tommi Verho	(Finland) Raine Peltokoski	
2005	Standard	(Finland) Mikko Kuisma	(Finland) Isto Hyyryläinen	(Finland) Kristian Poikonen	
2006	Open	(Finland) Raine Peltokoski	(Finland) Antti Hintsanen	(Finland) Tommi Verho	
2006	Standard	(Finland) Isto Hyyryläinen	(Finland) Mikko Kuisma	(Finland) Jari Rastas	
2007	Open	(Finland) Hannu Uronen	(Finland) Raine Peltokoski	(Finland) Petri H Runtti	
2007	Standard	(Finland) Tommi Verho	(Finland) Isto Hyyryläinen	(Finland) Jari Rastas	
2008	Open	(Finland) Raine Peltokoski	(Finland) Hannu Uronen	(Finland) Kimmo Iso-Tuisku	
2008	Standard	(Finland) Mika Riste	(Finland) Ilkka Kervinen	(Finland) Isto Hyyryläinen	
2009	Open	(Finland) Raine Peltokoski	(Finland) Kimmo K Iso-tuisku	(Finland) Jarkko Laukia	
2009	Standard	(Finland) Isto Hyyryläinen	(Finland) Ilkka Kervinen	(Finland) Mika J Riste	
2010	Open	(Finland)	(Finland)	(Finland)	
2010	Standard	(Finland)	(Finland)	(Finland)	
2011	Open	(Finland) Raine Peltokoski	(Finland) Jarkko Laukia	(Finland) Tuukka Jokinen	
2011	Standard	(Finland) Mikael Kaislaranta	(Finland) Isto Hyyryläinen	(Finland) Mikko Kuisma	
2012	Open	(Finland) Raine Peltokoski	(Finland) Teemu Rintala	(Finland) Petri Runtti	
2012	Standard	(Finland) Mika Riste	(Finland) Isto Hyyryläinen	(Finland) Tommi Verho	
2013	Open	(Finland) Jarkko Laukia	(Finland) Hannu Uronen	(Finland) Kimmo Iso-tuisku	
2013	Standard	(Finland) Marko Kervola	(Finland) Lari Manninen	(Finland) Isto Hyyryläinen	
2014	Open	(Finland) Raine Peltokoski	(Finland) Jarkko Laukia	(Finland) Teemu Rintala	
2014	Standard	(Finland) Sami Hautamäki	(Finland) Timo Vehviläinen	(Finland) Ilkka Siitonen	
2015	Open	(Finland) Raine Peltokoski	(Finland) Teemu Rintala	(Finland) Petri Runtti	
2015	Standard	(Finland) Mika J Riste	(Finland) Isto Hyyryläinen	(Finland) Tommi Verho	
2016	Open	(Finland) Jarkko Laukia	(Finland) Teemu Rintala	(Finland) Hannu Uronen	
2016	Standard	(Finland) Sami Hautamäki	(Finland) Timo Vehviläinen	(Finland) Isto Hyyryläinen	
2018	Open	(Finland) Jarkko Laukia	(Finland) Lauri Nousiainen	(Finland) Jorma Rissanen	
2018	Standard	(Finland) Sami Hautamäki	(Finland) Timo Vehviläinen	(Finland) Teemu Rintala	
2023	Open	(Finland) Jarkko Laukia	(Finland) Antti Leppänen	(Finland) Anssi Vääriskoski	
2023	Standard	(Finland) Sami Hautamäki	(Finland) Heikki Tikkanen	(Finland) Eero Tapio	

=== Junior category ===
Year	Division	Gold	Silver	Bronze	Venue
2007	Standard	(Finland) Marko O Espo	(Finland) Toni Palmola	(Finland) Juha-Matti Jääskeläinen	
2007	Standard	(Finland) Marko O Espo	(Finland) Joonas Saarilahti	(Finland) Toni Palmola	

=== Senior category ===
Year	Division	Gold	Silver	Bronze	Venue
2004	Open	(Finland) Tarmo Rinne	(Finland) Markku Koistinen	(Finland) Martti V Väisänen	
2009	Open	(Finland) Markku Koistinen	(Finland) Pekka T Partanen	(Finland) Matti Kivi	
2011	Open	(Finland) Ari Honkala	(Finland) Hannu Appelsiin	(Finland) Jouni Aaltonen	
2012	Open	(Finland) Pertti Karhunen	(Finland) Tarmo Rinne	(Finland) Ari Honkala	
2015	Open	(Finland) Pertti Karhunen	(Finland) Tarmo Rinne	(Finland) Ari Honkala	

== See also ==
- IPSC Finnish Handgun Championship
- IPSC Finnish Shotgun Championship
- IPSC Finnish Tournament Championship
- IPSC Finnish Action Air Championship
