= Norwegian Reservists Association =

Norwegian interest organisation

Coat of arms.

The Norwegian Reservist Association (Norwegian: Norsk Reservistforbund) is an interest organisation for military reserve officers in Norway.

It was established as the Conscript Officers' Association (Norwegian: Vernepligtige Officerers Forening) in 1896, changed its name to Norwegian Reserve Officers’ Association (NROF) in 1975. Another name change happened in 2022, while keeping the old abbreviation NROF. The association is a political independent organization, consists of 57 local branches nationwide, with about 7000 members in total.

Norwegian citizens who serve, or have served in the Armed Forces, can be members of the Norwegian Reservist Association. It publishes the magazine Pro Patria. President is Jørn Buø, and the organizational headquarters are in Oslo.

== See also ==
- Finnish Reservist Sports Federation and SRA-shooting
