= SRA =

SRA may refer to:

- SRA0 to SRA4, standard paper sizes defined by ISO 217
- Satanic ritual abuse
- SRa or SRA, a type of semiregular variable star
- Senior Airman (SrA), a US Air Force rank
- Septic Reserve Area, for a septic drain field
- The National Center for Biotechnology Information's Sequence Read Archive (previously Short Read Archive)
- Serotonin releasing agent, a type of drug
- SRA-shooting, Sovellettu reserviläisammunta, a type of shooting sport from Finland
- Stratford station, London, UK, station code
- Superhuman Registration Act, a fictitious law in Marvel Comics
- Surveillance radar approach in aviation
- sra, Shift Right Arith, an RISC-V instruction

== Companies and organizations ==
- Science Research Associates, US educational publisher
- Secretariat of Agrarian Reform, Mexico
- Sexual Recovery Anonymous, a sexual addiction program
- Skiff Racing Association
- Social Research Association, UK and Ireland
- Socialist Rifle Association, US
- Society for Risk Analysis
- Solicitors Regulation Authority, a regulatory body for solicitors in England and Wales
- SRA International, a US information technology firm
- State Rail Authority, a former railway operator in Australia
- California State Relief Administration, US New Deal agency
- Strategic Rail Authority, UK
- Stringent regulatory authority, any national regulatory agency for medications and medical devices that passes WHO criteria for the strength of its health and safety protection
- Student Radio Association
- Sugar Regulatory Administration, Philippines
- Super Rugby Americas, a rugby tournament founded in 2019
- Sustainable Restaurant Association, UK
- Swedish Road Administration
