= Erdembilegiin Erdenekhaliu =

Mongolian sports shooter

Personal information
- Nationality: Mongolian

Sport
- Sport: Practical shooting
Medal record
Men's Practical shooting
Representing Mongolia
IPSC World championships
Gold medal – first place	2024 Oulu	Team

Erdembilegiin Erdenekhaliu (Mongolian: Эрдэмбилэгийн Эрдэнэхалиу) is a Mongolian sport shooter. He won a gold medal as a team in the men's rifle of the Manual Action Bolt Open division at the 2024 IPSC World championships in Oulu, the Republic of Finland.
