= IPSC Finnish Action Air Championship =

Sport shooting competition in Finland

The IPSC Finnish Action Air Championship is an IPSC level 3 Action Air championship held once a year by the Finnish Shooting Sport Federation.

== Champions ==
The following is a list of current and previous champions.

=== Overall category ===
| Year | Division | Gold | Silver | Bronze |
|---|---|---|---|---|
| 2012 | Standard | (Finland) Jani Lehtonen | (Finland) Jaakko M Viitala | (Finland) Juho Kangasniemi |
| 2013 | Open | (Finland) Jani Lehtonen | (Finland) Roy Juurijoki | (Finland) Jesse Nio |
| 2013 | Standard | (Finland) Jaakko M Viitala | (Finland) Timo T Martikainen | (Finland) Sauli Luolajan-Mikkola |
| 2014 | Open | (Finland) Jesse Nio | (Finland) Mikko Lampinen | (Finland) Roy Juurijoki |
| 2014 | Standard | (Finland) Jaakko M Viitala | (Finland) Kim Leppänen | (Finland) Timo T Martikainen |
| 2015 | Open | (Finland) Roy Juurijoki | (Finland) Perttu Piironen | (Finland) Mika Vuolle |
| 2015 | Standard | (Finland) Kim Leppänen | (Finland) Jaakko Viitala | (Finland) Timo Jetsonen |
| 2015 | Production | (Finland) Jesse Nio | (Finland) Jani Lehtonen | (Finland) Jere Hakanen |
| 2016 | Open | (Finland) Jani Lehtonen | (Finland) Jukka Kilpiö | (Finland) Juuso Sormunen |
| 2016 | Standard | (Finland) Timo Jetsonen | (Finland) Juha Toivola | (Finland) Juha Ollikainen |
| 2016 | Classic | (Finland) Roy Juurijoki | (Finland) Jarkko Suntioinen | (Finland) Eemeli Etelä |
| 2016 | Production | (Finland) Jesse Nio | (Finland) Mika Vuolle | (Finland) Raimo Soikkeli |
| 2017 | Open | (Finland) Roy Juurijoki | (Finland) Mika Vuolle | (Finland) Jusa Pietilä |
| 2017 | Standard | (Finland) Juha Toivola | (Finland) Jari Lavapuro | (Finland) Teemu Makkonen |
| 2017 | Classic | (Finland) Jarkko Suntioinen | (Finland) Wille Kuutti | (Finland) Juha Sarametsä |
| 2017 | Production | (Finland) Jesse Nio | (Finland) Tomy Lindström | (Finland) Juha Eklöv |
| 2018 | Open | (Finland) Mika Vuolle | (Finland) Kim Leppänen | (Finland) Tomy Lindström |
| 2018 | Standard | (Finland) Jari Lavapuro | (Finland) Pyry Laine | (Finland) Kaisa Selkämaa |
| 2018 | Classic | (Finland) Roy Juurijoki | (Finland) Markku Matilainen | (Finland) Jarkko Suntioinen |
| 2018 | Production | (Finland) Jesse Nio | (Finland) Jari Sievänen | (Finland) Anna-Katriina Salomaa |
| 2019 | Open | (Finland) Lauri Jantunen | (Finland) Tomy Lindström | (Finland) Arttu Salminen |
| 2019 | Standard | (Finland) Kim Leppänen | (Finland) Jaakko Viitala | (Finland) Pyry Laine |
| 2019 | Classic | (Finland) Jesse Nio | (Finland) Markku Matilainen | (Finland) Jari Viljasaari |
| 2019 | Production | (Finland) Roy Juurijoki | (Finland) Jarkko Suntioinen | (Finland) Jari Sievänen |
| 2020 | Open | (Finland) Mika Vuolle | (Finland) Roy Juurijoki | (Finland) Tomy Lindström |
| 2020 | Standard | (Finland) Kim Leppänen | (Finland) Jesse Nio | (Finland) Juha Toivola |
| 2021 | Open | (Finland) Tomy Lindström | (Finland) Eero Sivula | (Finland) Jari Sievänen |
| 2021 | Standard | (Finland) Kim Leppänen | (Finland) Mika Kontulainen | (Finland) Tino Tapio |
| 2021 | Classic | (Finland) Juha Hietikko | (Finland) Teemu Makkonen | (Finland) Jari Viljasaari |
| 2021 | Production | (Finland) Jesse Nio | (Finland) Matti Lahtinen | (Finland) Jarno Pöhö |

== See also ==
- IPSC Finnish Handgun Championship
- IPSC Finnish Rifle Championship
- IPSC Finnish Shotgun Championship
- IPSC Finnish Tournament Championship
