= Finnish Reservist Sports Federation =

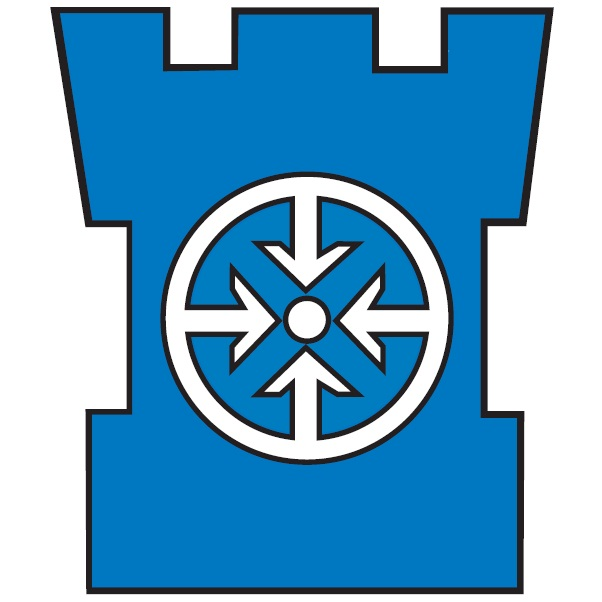
Finnish Reservist Sports Federation - RESUL - logo

Finnish Reservist Sports Federation (RESUL) is the national sports federation for voluntary national defense organizations. It is a registered, non-profit organization operating in Finland, its headquarters located in Helsinki.

== Mission ==
The primary mission of RESUL is to maintain and develop the skills and abilities of its members:

- Physical fitness
- Field skills, including:
  - Orienteering
  - Shooting, see SRA-shooting
  - Navigation
  - Fire control
  - Leadership
  - Hiking

== Organization ==
The organization is directed by a board, headed by the chairman of the board. The board members represent the members organizations of the Federation:

- the Finnish Reservists' Association (FRA)
- the Finnish Reserve Officers’ Federation (FROF)
- the Defence Guilds' Federation of Finland (MPKL)

Combined, the voluntary national defense organizations represent over 80.000 people in Finland.

=== Management team ===
- President, Juha Vasama
- First Vice President, Eerik Tuovinen
- Second Vice President, Harri Kastepohja
- Executive Director, Veli-Matti Kesälahti

== History ==
RESUL was founded in 12.12.1970. The founding organizations were Finnish NCO Association (later the Finnish Reservists' Association FRA), the Finnish Reserve Officers' Federation and all regional organizations thereof. In December 1998 RESUL became a member of National Defense Training Association (MPK), and re-joined the organization after it was re-organized in 01.01.2008.

== See also ==
- Norwegian Reserve Officers' Federation
