= Sami Hautamäki =

Finnish sport shooter

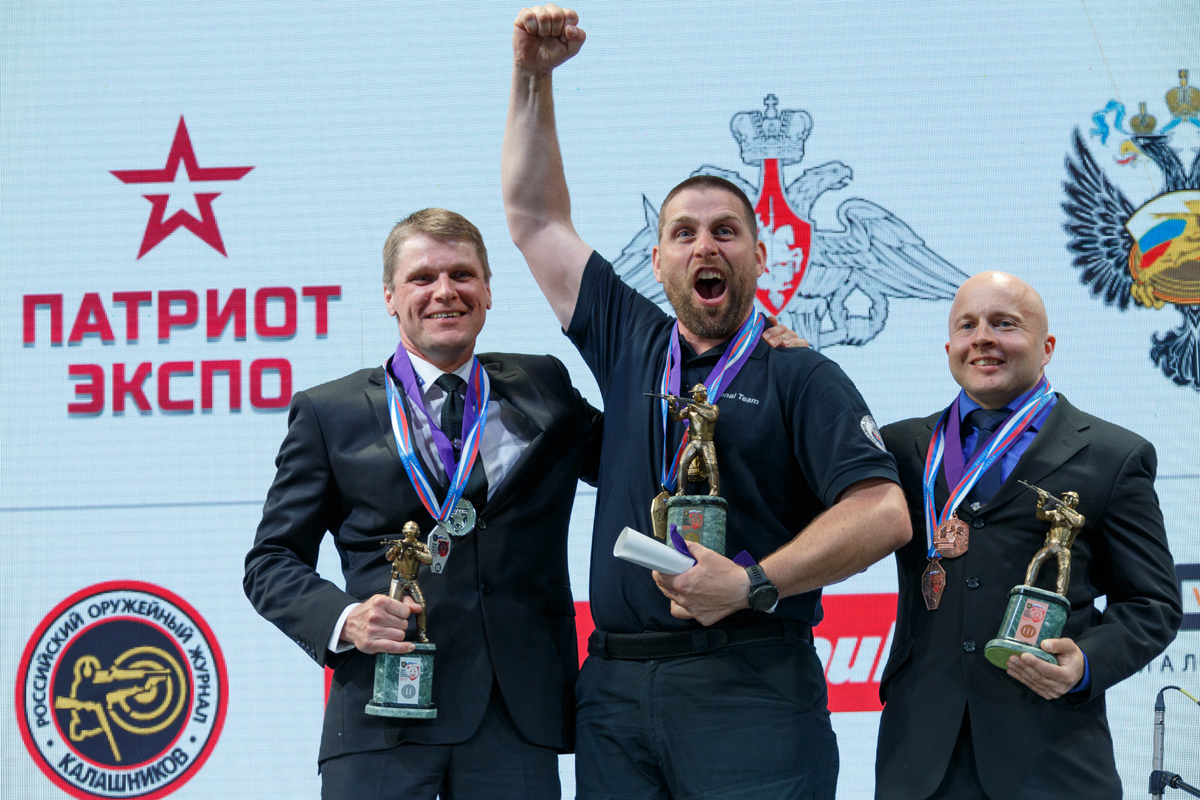
- Sami Hautamäki (left) at the podium of the 2017 IPSC Rifle World Shoot

Personal information
- Nationality: (Finland) Finnish
Medal record
IPSC
Representing Finland
IPSC Rifle World Shoots
Silver medal – second place	2017 Moscow	Standard
Gold medal – first place	2019 Sweden	Standard
Gold medal – first place	2024 Finland	Standard
IPSC European Rifle Championship
Gold medal – first place	2015 Bükk	Standard
IPSC Nordic Rifle Championship
Gold medal – first place	2013 Snillfjord	Standard
Gold medal – first place	2014 Finland	Standard
Silver medal – second place	2015 Denmark	Standard
Gold medal – first place	2017 Karlskoga	Standard
Gold medal – first place	2018 Hanko	Standard
Gold medal – first place	2022 Denmark	Standard
Gold medal – first place	2023 Ruutikangas	Standard
IPSC Shotgun World Shoots
Silver medal – second place	2018 Châteauroux	Modified
Silver medal – second place	2023 Pattaya	Modified

Sami Hautamäki is a Finnish sport shooter who took silver in the Standard division behind Håvard Østgaard at the 2017 IPSC Rifle World Shoot, and silver in the Modified division behind Teemu Rintala at the 2018 IPSC Shotgun World Shoot. In 2015 he became the European IPSC Rifle Championship winner in the Standard division. He also has five podium finishes at the IPSC Nordic Rifle Championships, with four of them being gold.

== See also ==
- Raine Peltokoski, Finnish sport shooter
- Josh Froelich, American sport shooter
- Michal Vavrečka, Czech sport shooter
