= IPSC Finnish Handgun Championship =

Sport shooting competition in Finland

The IPSC Finnish Handgun Championship is an IPSC level 3 championship held once a year by the Finnish Shooting Sport Federation.

== Champions ==
The following is a list of current and previous champions.

=== Overall category ===
Year	Division	Gold	Silver	Bronze	Venue
1993	Modified	(Finland) Raine Peltokoski			
2004	Open	(Finland) Vesa Jumppanen	(Finland) Tommi Marttinen	(Finland) Peter Kaski	
2004	Modified	(Finland) Kimmo K Iso-Tuisku	(Finland) Kristian Poikonen	(Finland) Tommi Forsell	
2004	Standard	(Finland) Petteri Aro	(Finland) Timo McKeown	(Finland) Lauri Nousiainen	
2004	Production	(Finland) Ismo K Tiermas	(Finland) Petri H Runtti	(Finland) Janne Toikkanen	
2006	Open	(Finland) Tony Ruohonen	(Finland) Jyrki Kadenius	(Finland) Jukka Suominen	
2006	Standard	(Finland) Mats Bäckström	(Finland) Mikko Kuisma	(Finland) Ville Kohonen	
2006	Production	(Finland) Matti Manni	(Finland) Timo McKeown	(Finland) Raine Peltokoski	
2007	Open	(Finland) Petri Runtti	(Finland) Vesa Jumppanen	(Finland) Raine Peltokoski	
2007	Standard	(Finland) Matti Manni	(Finland) Lauri Nousiainen	(Finland) Atte Vainionpää	
2007	Production	(Finland) Timo Mckeown	(Finland) Vesa Kaunisto	(Finland) Harri Ylinen	
2009	Open	(Finland) Raine Peltokoski	(Finland) Hannu Uronen	(Finland) Petri Runtti	
2009	Modified	(Finland) Harri Kykkänen	(Finland) Matti Peippo	(Finland) Timo Mckeown	
2009	Standard	(Finland) Tony Ruohonen	(Finland) Risto Hirvikallio	(Finland) Esa Marjoniemi	
2009	Production	(Finland) Vesa Kaunisto	(Finland) Lauri Nousiainen	(Finland) Tero Nikkarikoski	
2010	Open	(Finland) Raine Peltokoski	(Finland) Tommi Marttinen	(Finland) Petri Runtti	
2010	Modified	(Finland) Asmo Niveri	(Finland) Jari Aalto	(Finland) Seppo Nurmi	
2010	Standard	(Finland) Stefan Borgström	(Finland) Mikael Kaislaranta	(Finland) Jari Majuri	
2010	Production	(Finland) Timo Mckeown	(Finland) Petri Wächter	(Finland) Ville Väistö	

=== Junior category ===
Year	Division	Gold	Silver	Bronze	Venue
2005	Production Junior	(Finland) Joonas Saarilahti	(Finland) Juha-Matti Jääskeläinen	(Finland) Jussi Marttinen	
2009	Standard Junior	(Finland) Risto Hirvikallio	(Finland) Thomas Rönnberg	(Finland) Iiro Vanne	

=== Senior category ===
Year	Division	Gold	Silver	Bronze	Venue
2007	Standard Senior	(Finland) Tarmo Rinne	(Finland) Pekka Karras	(Finland) Sakari Haapasalo	
2009	Standard Senior	(Finland) Peter Rönnberg	(Finland) Risto Palmola	(Finland) Pekka Partanen	
2010	Open Senior	(Finland) Jukka Suominen	(Finland) Risto Palmola	(Finland) Pekka Partanen	
2010	Modified Senior	(Finland) Peter Rönnberg	(Finland) Ari Honkala	(Finland) Timo Salminen	

== See also ==
- IPSC Finnish Rifle Championship
- IPSC Finnish Shotgun Championship
- IPSC Finnish Tournament Championship
- IPSC Finnish Action Air Championship
