= IPSC Nordic Shotgun Championship =

Sport shooting competition

The IPSC Nordic Shotgun Championship is an IPSC level 3 championship hosted in every year either in Norway, Sweden, Finland or Denmark.

== Champions ==
The following is a list of current and past IPSC Nordic Shotgun champions.

=== Overall category ===
Year	Division	Gold	Silver	Bronze	Venue
2013	Modified	(Finland) Jani Lehtonen	(Finland) Mikael Kaislaranta	(Finland) Olli-pekka Partanen	Loimaa Shotgun VII, Loimaa, Finland
2013	Open	(Sweden) Johan Hansen	(Finland) Lauri Nousiainen	(Finland) Antti Saar	Loimaa Shotgun VII, Loimaa, Finland
2013	Standard	(Finland) Mika Riste	(Finland) Jarkko Laukia	(Finland) Timo T Vehviläinen	Loimaa Shotgun VII, Loimaa, Finland
2013	Standard Manual	(Finland) Ari Matero	(Finland) Mikaell Ekberg	(Finland) Matti Mikkola	Loimaa Shotgun VII, Loimaa, Finland
2014	No championship held				
2015	No championship held				
2016	Modified	(Finland) Sami Hautamäki	(Finland) Mikael Kaislaranta	(Finland) Timo T Vehviläinen	Ultimate Nordic Shotgun 2016, Loimaa, Finland
2016	Open	(Finland) Lauri Nousiainen	(Finland) Andrei Siuniakou	(Finland) Jani Lehtonen	Ultimate Nordic Shotgun 2016, Loimaa, Finland
2016	Standard	(Finland) Jarkko Laukia	(Finland) Kim Leppänen	(Finland) Mika J Riste	Ultimate Nordic Shotgun 2016, Loimaa, Finland
2016	Standard Manual	(Finland) Jaakko M Viitala	(Sweden) Teddi Sörensson	(Finland) Teemu Potkonen	Ultimate Nordic Shotgun 2016, Loimaa, Finland
2017	Modified	No competitors			Blacksmith Shotgun Open 2017, Eskilstuna, Sweden
2017	Open	(Finland) Lauri Nousiainen	(Sweden) Johan Hansen	(Sweden) Stefan Ekstedt	Blacksmith Shotgun Open 2017, Eskilstuna, Sweden
2017	Standard	(Finland) Mika Riste	(Sweden) Thomas Edvardsson	(Finland) Mikael Kaislaranta	Blacksmith Shotgun Open 2017, Eskilstuna, Sweden
2017	Standard Manual	(Finland) Jaakko Viitala	(Sweden) Teddi Sörensson	(Finland) Teemu Potkonen	Blacksmith Shotgun Open 2017, Eskilstuna, Sweden
2018					Finland

=== Lady category ===
Year	Division	Gold	Silver	Bronze	Venue
2016	Standard Lady	(Finland) Merja Kivimäki	(Finland) Outi Fjallstrom	(Finland) Miia Kaartinen	Ultimate Nordic Shotgun 2016, Loimaa, Finland
2017	Open Lady	(Sweden) Marianne Hansen	(Sweden) Pia Clerté	(Sweden) Erika Härnström	Blacksmith Shotgun Open 2017, Eskilstuna, Sweden

=== Senior category ===
Year	Division	Gold	Silver	Bronze	Venue
2013	Open	(Finland) Matti Rautakumpu	(Finland) Timo Salminen	(Sweden) Walter Kitzinger	Loimaa Shotgun VII, Loimaa, Finland
2016	Open Senior	(Finland) Jukka Kilpiö	(Finland) Turkka Tengström	(Finland) Juha E Riihimäki	Ultimate Nordic Shotgun 2016, Loimaa, Finland
2016	Standard Senior	(Finland) Ari Honkala	(Finland) Mikael Ekberg	(Finland) Niilo Tiili	Ultimate Nordic Shotgun 2016, Loimaa, Finland
2017	Open Senior	(Sweden) Johan Hansen	(Sweden) Stefan Ekstedt	(Sweden) Dick Qvarnström	Blacksmith Shotgun Open 2017, Eskilstuna, Sweden
2017	Standard Senior	(Finland) Mikael Kaislaranta	(Denmark) Ole Mortensen	(Sweden) Bo Nilsson	Blacksmith Shotgun Open 2017, Eskilstuna, Sweden
2017	Standard Manual Senior	(Finland) Matti Mikkola	(Sweden) Stefan Grahn	(Sweden) Leif Johansson	Blacksmith Shotgun Open 2017, Eskilstuna, Sweden

=== Team category ===
Year	Division	Gold	Silver	Bronze	Venue
2017	Open	(Sweden) Daniel Falk, Johan Hansen, Magnus Gustafsson, Stefan Ekstedt	(Finland) Jari Rastas, Lauri Nousiainen, Petri Eronen	(Denmark) Jan Leth Espersen, Karsten Andreasen, Nicolas Ravn	Blacksmith Shotgun Open 2017, Eskilstuna, Sweden
2017	Standard	(Finland) Mika Riste, Mika Ylinen, Mikael Kaislaranta, Niko Kurikka	(Sweden) Magnus Gustafsson, Mathias Henricsson, Robert Söderström, Thomas Edvardsson	(Denmark) Bo Stampe, Kim Frandsen, Ole Mortensen	Blacksmith Shotgun Open 2017, Eskilstuna, Sweden
2017	Standard Manual	(Finland) Jaakko Viitala, Matti Mikkola, Teemu Potkonen, Tomi Kivisaari	(Sweden) Henrik Jonsson, Jimmy Svensson, Robert Andersson, Teddi Sörensson	-	Blacksmith Shotgun Open 2017, Eskilstuna, Sweden
