= Jose Vidanes =

American sport shooter from California

Jose Claudio Vidanes
Medal record
IPSC
Representing United States
IPSC Handgun World Shoots
Gold medal – first place	2008 Bali	Modified
IPSC Rifle World Shoots
Gold medal – first place	2017 Moscow	Senior Open
IPSC Shotgun World Shoots
Silver medal – second place	2018 Châteauroux	Senior Open
IPSC US Handgun Championship
Silver medal – second place	2013 Frostproof	Classic

Jose "Jojo" Vidanes is an American sport shooter from California who won the overall 2008 IPSC Handgun World Shoot Modified division title. He also has a senior category gold medal in Open division from the 2017 Rifle World Shoot main match and Shoot-Off event, and a senior category silver medal from the 2018 Shotgun World Shoot. Jojo and his daughter, Isa, earned a silver medal in the Family Team category at the 2019 IPSC Rifle World Shoot, where he also earned a senior category silver medal in Open division.

Jojo started competing actively around 1990, and already won a number of regional IPSC championships in 1993 and 1994.

== See also ==
- Jerry Miculek, American sport shooter
