= 2017 IPSC Rifle World Shoot =

International sport shooting competition

- Official logo of the 2017 IPSC Rifle World Shoot
- Venue: Patriot Park
- Location: Kubinka, Moscow Oblast, Russia
- Dates: Opening Ceremony: 4. June; Main Match: 5. to 10. June; Shoot-Off: 11. June; Closing Ceremony: 11. June
- Competitors: 591 from 40 nations

Medalists
gold medal	Open (Largest Division) (Finland) Teemu Rintala
silver medal	(Finland) Raine Peltokoski
bronze medal	(Finland) Jarkko Laukia

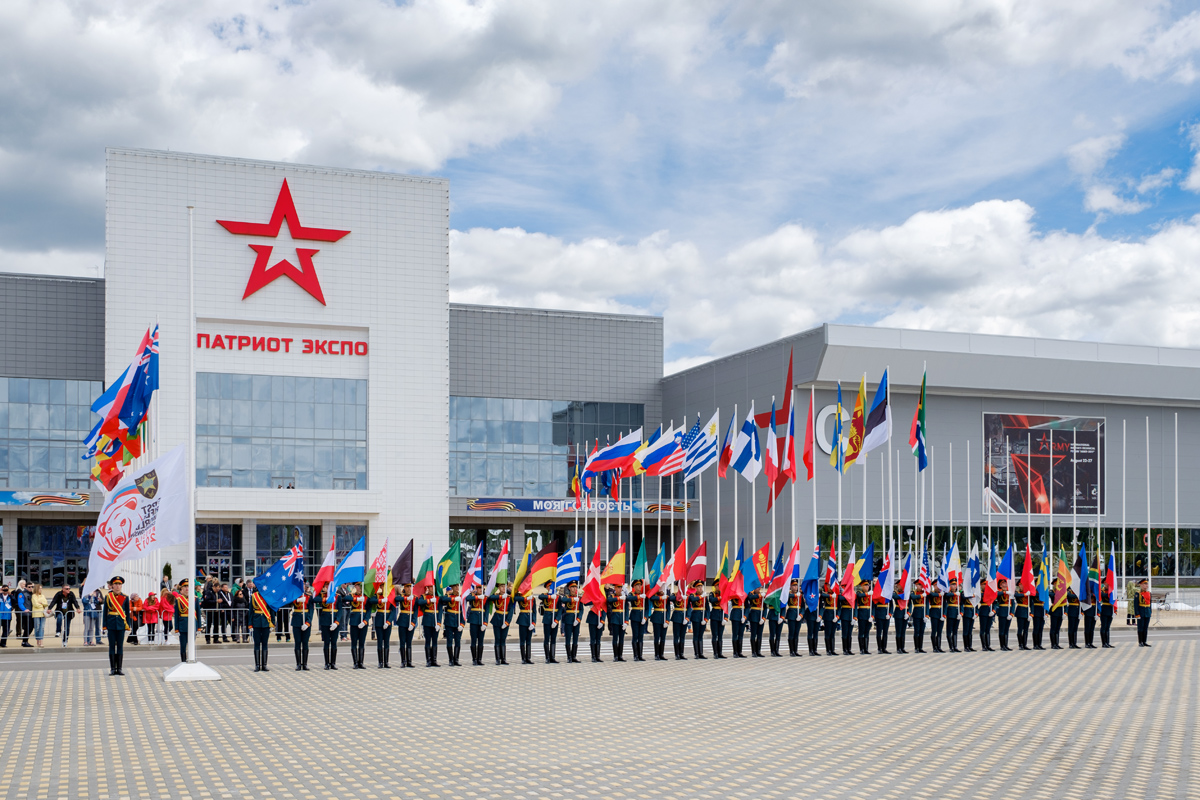
The opening ceremony at the 2017 IPSC Rifle World Shoot.

The 2017 IPSC Rifle World Shoot I held at the Patriot Park in Kubinka, Moscow, Russia was the first IPSC Rifle World Shoot. The match consisted of 30 stages over 6 days and 591 competitors from 40 nations.

Originally the championship was planned to be held during 2016, but was rescheduled to 2017 in order to finish the construction of the new shooting range in Patriot Park near Moscow. The majority of targets were placed between 60 and 100 meters, but many stages also included targets between 200 and 300 meters.

== Champions ==
=== Open ===
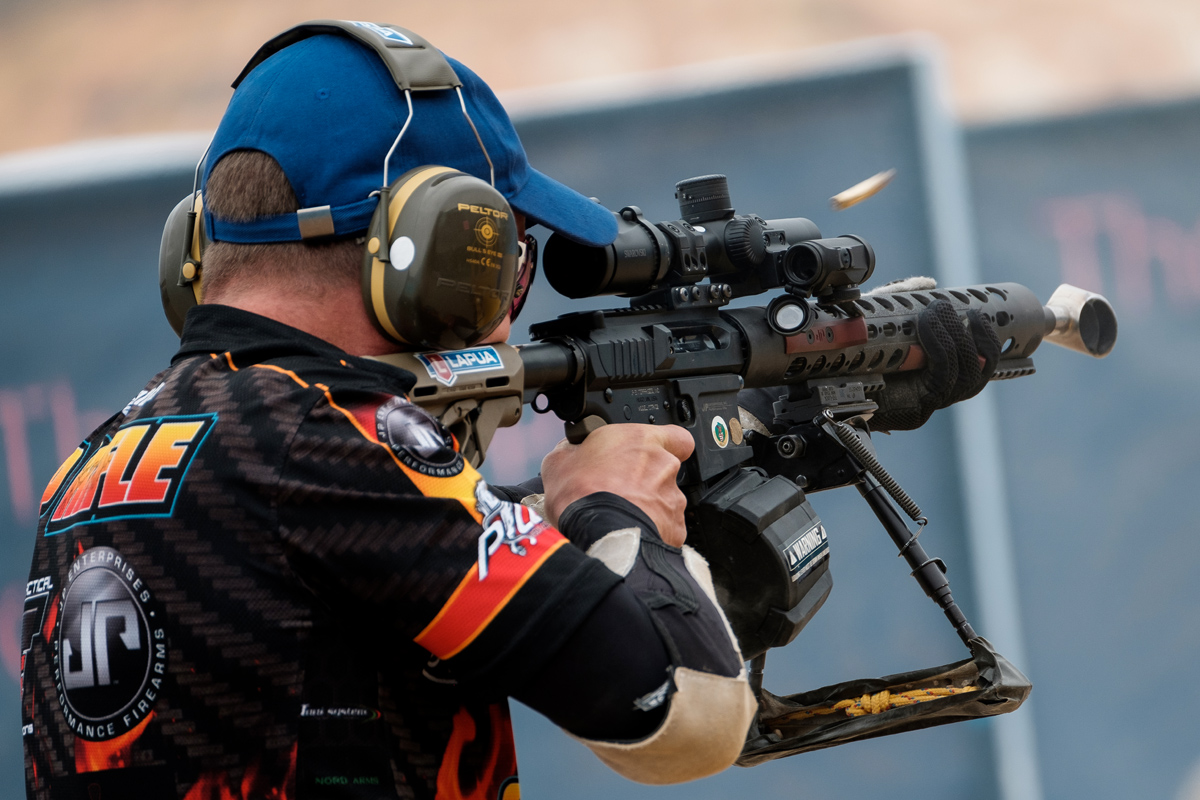
Teemu Rintala from Finland took gold in the Open division, which also was the largest division in the match.

The Semi Auto Open division had the largest match participation with 369 competitors (62.4%).

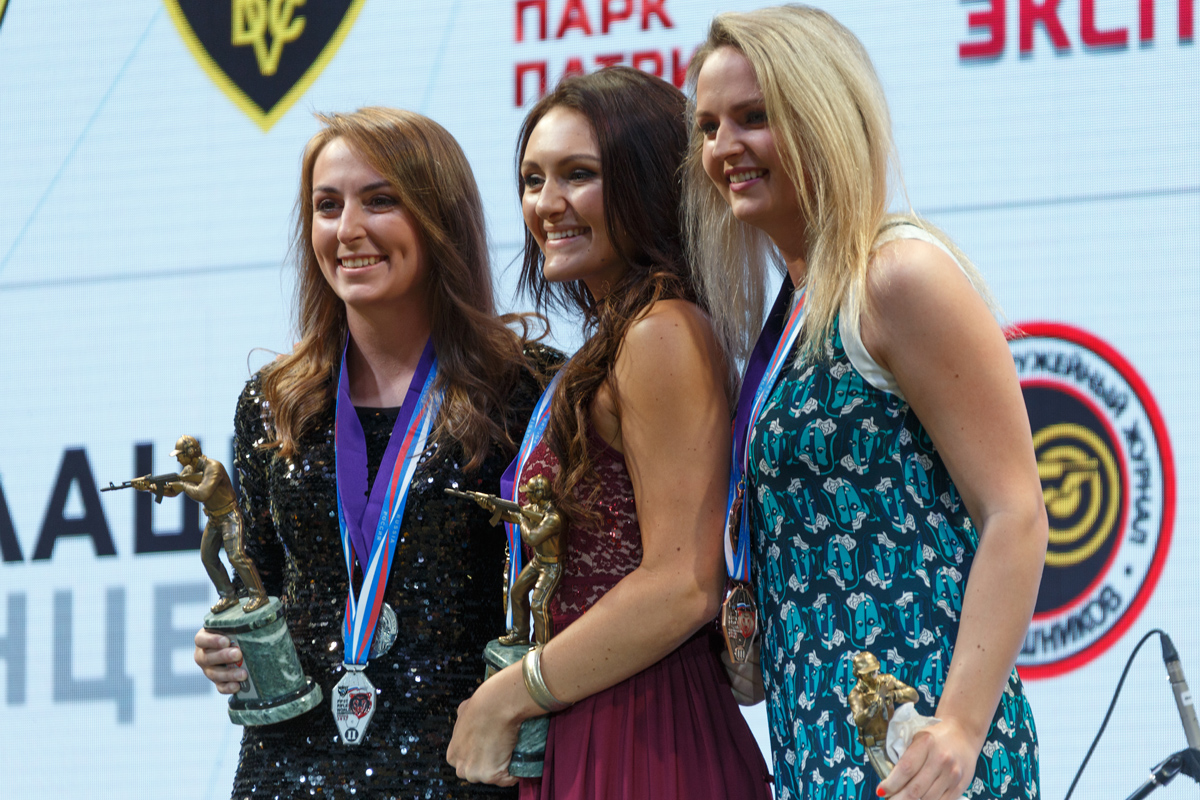
Lena Miculek won Open division Lady category in front of Ashley Rheuark and Maria Gushchina

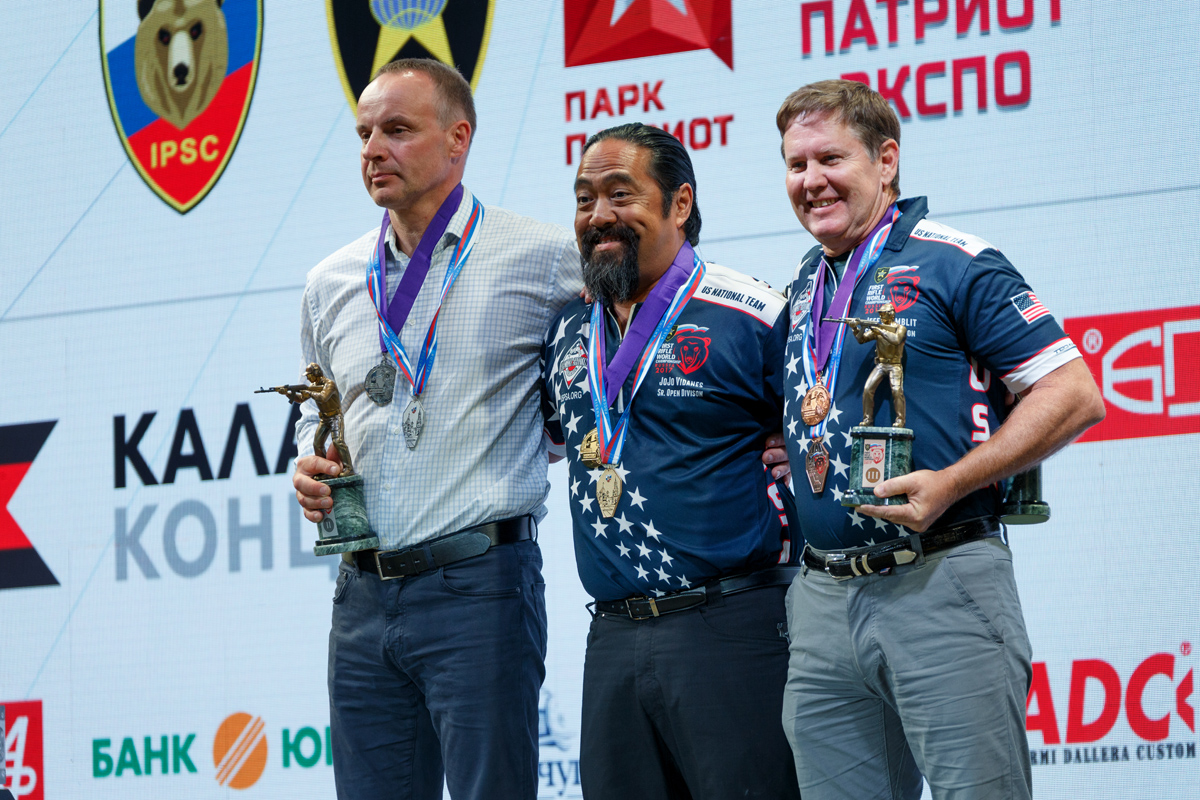
Jose Vidanes won Open division Senior category in front of Armin Meesit and Jeffrey Cramblit

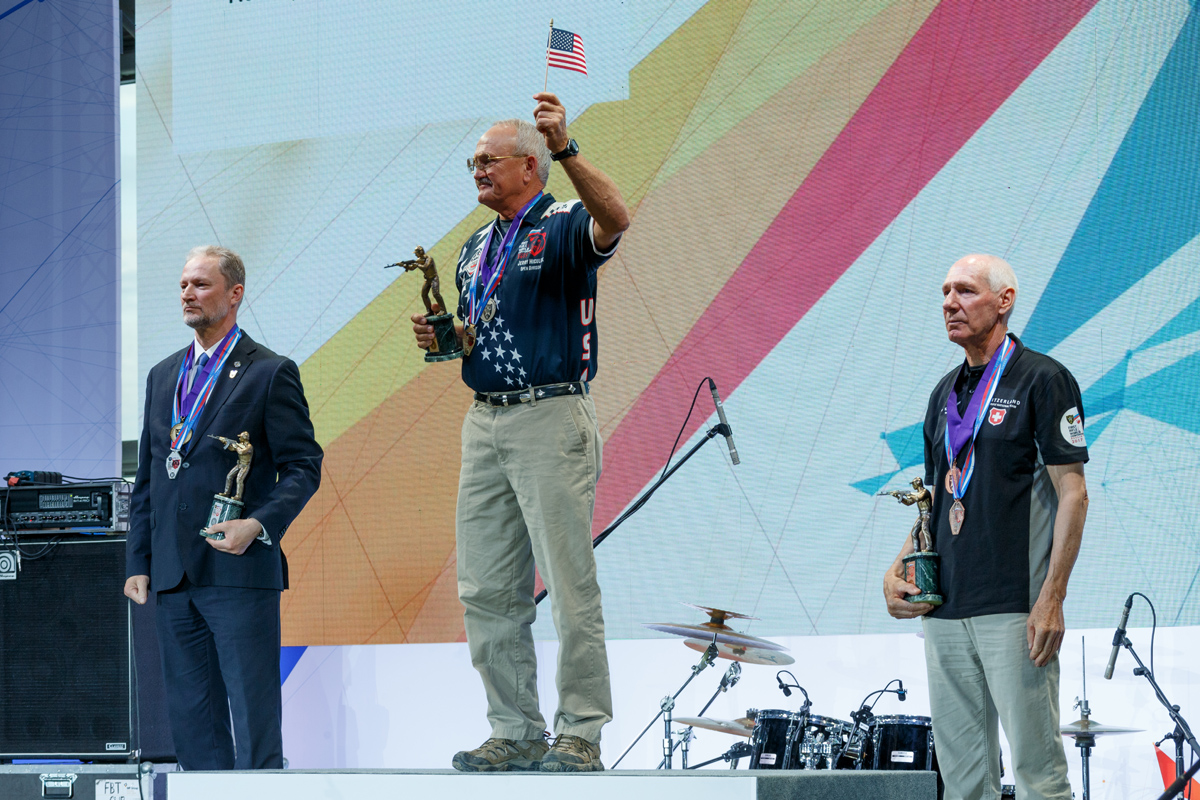
Jerry Miculek won Open division Super Senior category in front of Pertti Karhunen and Peter Kressibucher.

Individual

Overall	Competitor	Points	Overall Match Percent	
Gold	(Finland) Teemu Rintala	2042.2323	100.00%	
Silver	(Finland) Raine Peltokoski	2027.9855	99.30%	
Bronze	(Finland) Jarkko Laukia	2002.1833	98.04%	
4th	(Sweden) Olle Ackehed	1927.5757	94.39%	
5th	(Finland) Kim Leppänen	1919.4098	93.99%	
6th	(Czech Republic) Vaclav Vinduska	1891.9187	92.64%	
7th	(Finland) Tuukka Jokinen	1876.4734	91.88%	
8th	(Slovakia) Rastislav Korba	1842.4736	90.22%	
9th	(Slovenia) Martin Humar	1838.1161	90.01%	
10th	(United States) Tim Yackley	1838.0522	90.00%	
Lady	Competitor	Points	Overall percent	Category percent
Gold	(United States) Lena Miculek	1725.0396	84.47%	100.00%
Silver	(United States) Ashley Rheuark	1657.5176	81.16%	96.09%
Bronze	(Russia) Maria Gushchina	1370.2215	67.09%	79.43%
Junior	Competitor	Points	Overall percent	Category percent
Gold	(Russia) Andrei Kalinin	1211.1969	59.31%	100.00%
Silver	(Russia) Albert Gladkovskiy	1029.0289	50.39%	84.96%
Bronze	(Russia) Dmitry Novikov	931.6648	45.62%	76.92%
Senior	Competitor	Points	Overall percent	Category percent
Gold	(United States) Jose Vidanes	1714.8147	83.97%	100.00%
Silver	(Estonia) Armin Meesit	1659.9357	81.28%	96.80%
Bronze	(United States) Jeffrey Cramblit	1614.7163	79.07%	94.16%
Super Senior	Competitor	Points	Overall percent	Category percent
Gold	(United States) Jerry Miculek	1689.5569	82.73%	100.00%
Silver	(Finland) Pertti Karhunen	1485.0110	72.72%	87.89%
Bronze	(Switzerland) Peter Kressibucher	1300.5245	63.68%	76.97%

Teams Open

Overall	Country	Points	Percent	Team members
Gold	Finland	6072.4011	100.00%	Teemu Rintala, Raine Peltokoski, Jarkko Laukia, Kim Leppänen
Silver	Russia	5377.2810	88.55%	Gleb Svatikos, Sergey Orlov, Vadim Mikhailov, Maksim Shkoda
Bronze	Norway	5356.0055	88.20%	Kristian Rommen, Magnus Hagerud, Vegard Fredriksen, Glenn Ugulen
Lady teams	Country	Points	Percent	Team members
Gold	United States	4692.3460	100.00%	Lena Miculek, Ashley Rheuark, Sharon Miculek, Maggie Reese
Silver	Russia	4002.7844	85.30%	Maria Gushchina, Mariia Sveshnikova, Natalya Rimyantseva, Maria Shvarts
Bronze	Finland	3369.0270	71.80%	Marika Koskinen, Saara Nyman, Miia Kaartinen
Senior teams	Country	Points	Percent	Team members
Gold	United States	4895.8937	100.00%	Jose Vidanes, Jeffrey Cramblit, Barry Dueck, Michael Voigt
Silver	Sweden	4613.3613	94.23%	Johan Hansen, Leif Madsen, Per Bergfeldt, Johan Lindberg
Bronze	Italy	4509.8117	92.11%	Alessiopatrizio Galliani, Luciano Todisco, Fabrizio Pesce, Enri Botturi

=== Standard ===
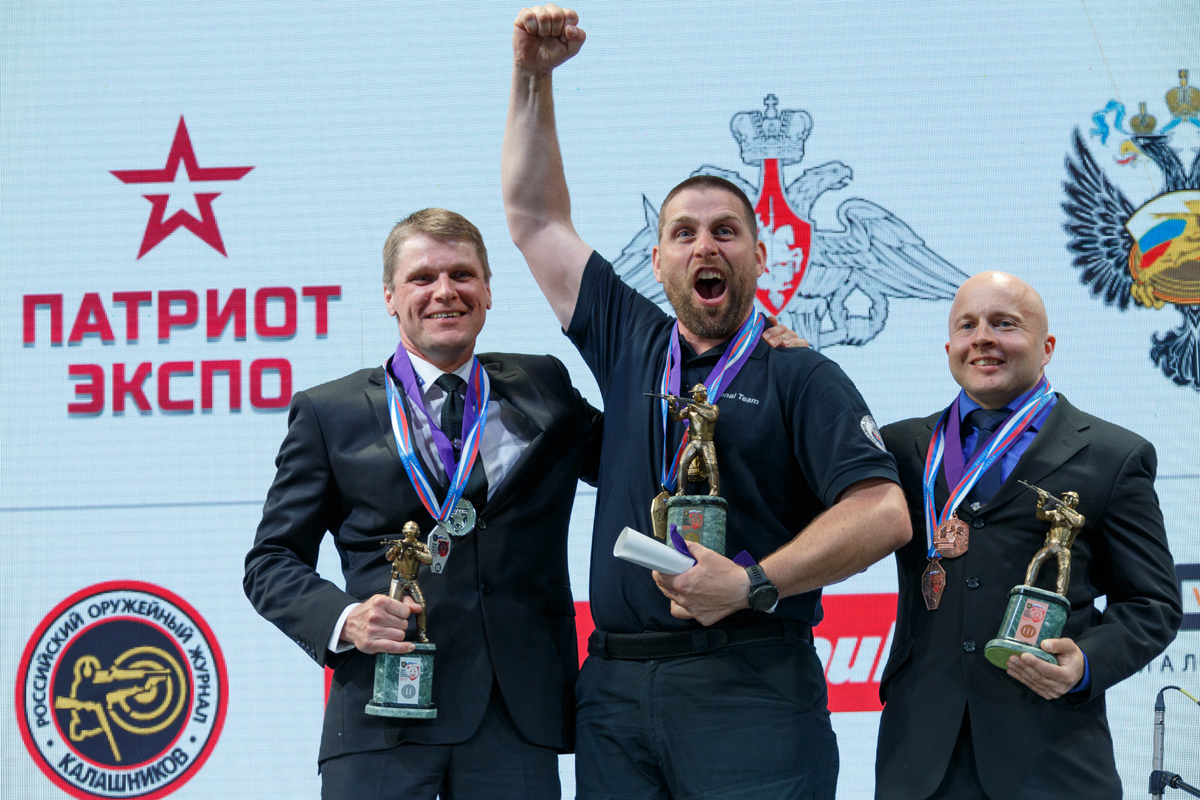
Håvard Østgaard took gold in the Standard Division in front of Sami Hautamäki and Timo Vehvilainen.

The Semi Auto Standard division had the second largest match participation with 131 competitors (22.2%).

Individual

Overall	Competitor	Points	Overall Match Percent	
Gold	(Norway) Håvard Østgaard	2174.6414	100.00%	
Silver	(Finland) Sami Hautamäki	2048.5280	94.20%	
Bronze	(Finland) Timo Vehvilainen	1969.5648	90.57%	
4th	(Finland) Isto Hyyrylainen	1960.7511	90.16%	
5th	(Russia) George Gubich	1950.9981	89.72%	
6th	(Russia) Anton Nazarov	1912.7625	87.96%	
7th	(Russia) Aleksandr Shutov	1886.5092	86.75%	
8th	(Finland) Atte Vainionpaa	1884.6962	86.67%	
9th	(Italy) Roberto Vezzoli	1873.4592	86.15%	
10th	(Finland) Mikael Kaislaranta	1848.1289	84.99%	
Lady	Competitor	Points	Overall percent	Category percent
Gold	(Russia) Anastasiya Tereshina	1230.2798	56.57%	100.00%
Silver	(Russia) Anna Puzyreva	1225.5261	56.36%	99.61%
Bronze	(Russia) Elena Merkulova	1109.9866	51.04%	90.22%
Senior	Competitor	Points	Overall percent	Category percent
Gold	(Finland) Mikael Kaislaranta	1848.1289	84.99%	100.00%
Silver	(Slovakia) Jan Palka	1801.3948	82.84%	97.47%
Bronze	(Russia) Vitaly Konev	1696.1173	78.00%	91.78%

Teams Standard

Overall	Country	Points	Percent	Team members
Gold	Finland	5978.8439	100.00%	Sami Hautamäki, Timo Vehvilainen, Isto Hyyryplainen, Atte Vainionpaa
Silver	Norway	5648.7710	94.48%	Ove J Skundberg, Sverre Idland, Kenneth Handberg, Håvard Østgaard
Bronze	Russia	5601.9515	93.70%	George Gubich, Aleksandr Shutov, Alan Alborov, Vitaly Konev

=== Manual Open ===
The Manual Action Open division had the third largest match participation with 52 competitors (8.8%). The Manual Action Standard 10 division had 10 competitors (1.7%) and was moved to Manual Open. Therefore, in total 62 competitors (10.5%) were scored in Manual Open.

Individual

Overall	Competitor	Points	Overall Match Percent	
Gold	(Russia) Roman Khalitov	1153.4760	100.00%	
Silver	(Russia) Egor Khramov	1136.5979	98.54%	
Bronze	(Sweden) Erik Bjaelkvall	1104.2071	95.73%	
4th	(Russia) Oleg Perfilev	1049.2842	90.97%	
5th	(Russia) Alena Karelina	995.6796	86.32%	
6th	(Russia) Alexey Basov	942.5182	81.71%	
7th	(Russia) Vsevolod Ilin	918.5630	79.63%	
8th	(Russia) Alexander Ivashko	914.2538	79.26%	
9th	(Russia) Dmitry Chernousov	883.5175	76.60%	
10th	(Russia) Bogdan Foka	865.1930	75.01%	
Lady	Competitor	Points	Overall percent	Category percent
Gold	(Russia) Alena Karelina	995.6796	86.32%	100.00%
Silver	(Russia) Irina Perfileva	756.1519	65.55%	75.94%
Bronze	(Russia) Tatiana Korobeinik	675.6481	58.57%	67.86%
Senior	Competitor	Points	Overall percent	Category percent
Gold	(Russia) Ramazan Mubarakov	855.3710	74.16%	100.00%
Silver	(Russia) Evgeny Efimov	832.3866	72.16%	97.31%
Bronze	(Italy) Fabio Egidio Fossati	807.2905	69.99%	94.38%

=== Manual Standard ===
The Manual Action Standard division had 29 competitors (4.9%).

Individual

Overall	Competitor	Points	Overall Match Percent	
Gold	(Russia) Vladimir Chamyan	1168.9862	100.00%	
Silver	(Russia) Andrei Kirisenko	1116.3281	95.50%	
Bronze	(Russia) Vladimir Novikov	1012.1761	86.59%	
4th	(Russia) Konstantin Shashin	903.0721	77.25%	
5th	(Belarus) Andrei Siuniakou	891.8261	76.29%	
6th	(Russia) Ilya Gubin	765.6178	65.49%	
7th	(Russia) Roman Bychkov	746.1449	63.83%	
8th	(Russia) Tatiana Isupova	739.1927	63.23%	
9th	(Belarus) Vitaly Yakutik	737.3936	63.08%	
10th	(Mongolia) Enkhbaatar Dorjpagma	710.9472	60.82%	
Lady	Competitor	Points	Overall percent	Category percent
Gold	(Russia) Tatiana Isupova	739.1927	63.23%	100.00%
Silver	(Kazakhstan) Olga Axyonkina	604.5402	51.71%	81.78%
Bronze	(Russia) Svetlana Kostromina	570.4442	48.80%	77.17%

== Medal table ==
Rank	Country	Gold	Silver	Bronze	Total
1	Russia	7	8	8	23
2	Finland	4	3	3	10
3	United States	5	1	1	7
4	Norway	1	1	1	3
5	Sweden	0	1	1	2
6	Italy	0	0	2	2
7	Estonia	0	1	0	1
8	Slovakia	0	1	0	1
9	Kazakhstan	0	1	0	1
10	Switzerland	0	0	1	1

== Shoot-Off side event ==
The Shoot-Off side event was an audience friendly one-against-one elimination cup held after the main match. It consisted of quarter finals, semi-finals, bronze and gold finals. The top 16 overall in each division and top 8 category shooters in each division were qualified, and the event was broadcast live with commentary on web television.

Division	Category	Gold	Silver	Bronze
Open	Overall	(Norway) Kristian Rommen	(Finland) Jarkko Laukia	(Sweden) Olle Ackehed
Open	Lady	(United States) Lena Miculek	(United States) Ashley Rheuark	(Russia) Natalia Rumyantsova
Open	Junior	(Russia) Dmitriy Novikov	(Russia) Anastasia Zharkovskaya	(Russia) Albert Gladkovskiy
Open	Senior	(United States) Jose Vidanes	(United States) Barry Dueck	(Sweden) Leif Madsen
Open	Super Senior	(United States) Jerry Miculek	(Sweden) Per Jonasson	(France) Jeel Gerard
Open	Military	(Russia) Konstantin Bliznetsov	(Russia) Pavel Kononenko	(Russia) Evgeniy Yudenko
Standard	Overall	(Finland) Isto Hyyrylainen	(Finland) Sami Hautamäki	(Italy) Roberto Vezzoli
Standard	Lady	(Russia) Elena Merkulova	(Russia) Anna Puzyreva	(Russia) Mariya Shalimova
Standard	Senior	(Finland) Mikael Kaislaranta	(Finland) Mikael Ekberg	(New Zealand) Phil Dunlop
Standard	Military	(Russia) Vladimir Repin	(Philippines) Ariel Taganait	(Russia) Dmitry Miroshnikov
Manual Open	Overall	(Russia) Oleg Perfilev	(Russia) Alena Karelina	(Russia) Alexander Ivashko
Manual Open	Lady	(Russia) Irina Perfileva	(Russia) Tatiana Makarova	(Russia) Anastasia Chernenko
Manual Open	Senior	(Russia) Evgeniy Efimov	(Italy) Paolo Zambai	(Italy) Fabio Egidio Fossati
Manual Standard	Overall	(Russia) Konstantin Shashin	(Kazakhstan) Olga Axyonkina	(Russia) Vladimir Novikov
Manual Standard	Lady	(Russia) Svetlana Kostromina	(Russia) Tatiana Isupova	(Russia) Anastasia Ananyeva
Manual Standard 10	Overall	(Russia) Sergey Gladkov	(Russia) Alexei Tiurin	(Kazakhstan) Liliya Uvarova

== See also ==
- IPSC Rifle World Shoots
- IPSC Shotgun World Shoot
- IPSC Handgun World Shoots
- IPSC Action Air World Shoot
