= 2024 IPSC Rifle World Shoot =

Sports Event World Championship

Coordinates: 64.7768°N 25.2326°E

- Venue: Ruutikangas Shooting Center
- Location: Oulu, Finland
- Dates: Opening Ceremony: 3 Aug; Main Match: 4-9 Aug; Shoot-Off: 10 Aug; Closing Ceremony: 10 Aug
- Competitors: 756 from 35 nations

Medalists
gold medal	Open (Largest Division) (United States) Kyle Litzie
silver medal	(Norway) Eirik Larsen
bronze medal	(Finland) Raine Peltokoski

The 2024 IPSC Rifle World Shoot III was the third IPSC Rifle World Shoot and was held in Ruutikangas Shooting Center, Liminka, near Oulu, Finland between 4 and 9 August. The match consisted of 30 stages over six days, and over 600 competitors. Kyle Litzie (USA) won the largest division (Open). Eirik Larsen (NOR) won silver and Raine Peltokoski (FIN) bronze.

The match was the first large match for the Ruutikangas Shooting Center, a newly established, expansive shooting facility covering approximately 93 hectares, designed to accommodate various shooting disciplines.

== Results ==
=== Semi Auto Open ===
The Semi Auto Open division had the largest match participation with 594 registered competitors.

Individual

Overall	Competitor	Points	Overall Match Percent
Gold	(United States) Kyle Litzie	2297.3733	100.00%
Silver	(Norway) Eirik Larsen	2272.7611	98.93%
Bronze	(Finland) Raine Peltokoski	2249.4110	97.91%

Lady

Lady	Competitor	Points	Category Match Percent	Overall Match Percent
Gold	(United States) Lena Miculek	1823.3128	100.00%	79.37%
Silver	(United States) Justine Williams	1651.2703	90.56%	71.88%
Bronze	(Finland) Reetta Paavola	1634.9724	89.67%	71.17%

Lady Senior

Lady Senior	Competitor	Points	Category Match Percent	Overall Match Percent
Gold	(Sweden) Pia Clerté	1312.4072	100.00%	57.13%
Silver	(Italy) Irene Canetta	1271.9909	96.92%	55.37%
Bronze	(Finland) Elina Karhunen	1222.0717	93.12%	53.19%

Junior

Junior	Competitor	Points	Category Match Percent	Overall Match Percent
Gold	(Sweden) Hugo Rinaldo	1,472.1521	100.00%	64.08%
Silver	(Slovakia) Samuel Ščepko	1324.4437	89.97%	57.65%
Bronze	(Finland) Ukko Nikki	1184.9064	80.49%	51.58%

Senior

Senior	Competitor	Points	Category Match Percent	Overall Match Percent
Gold	(Finland) Raine Peltokoski	2249.4110	100.00%	97.91%
Silver	(Finland) Jarkko Laukia	2070.6663	92.05%	90.13%
Bronze	(Norway) Kjetil Edvardsen	1827.5031	81.24%	79.55%

Super Senior

S. Senior	Competitor	Points	Category Match Percent	Overall Match Percent
Gold	(United States) Linwood Jarrett	1707.7201	100.00%	74.33%
Silver	(United States) Jerry Miculek	1643.9871	96.27%	71.56%
Bronze	(Sweden) Johan Hansen	1552.5542	90.91%	67.58%

Grand Senior

G. Senior	Competitor	Points	Category Match Percent	Overall Match Percent
Gold	(Italy) Massimo Corazzini	1224.8805	100.00%	53.32%
Silver	(South Africa) Irving Stevenson	1,157.1807	96.27%	50.37%
Bronze	(Switzerland) Peter Kressibucher	1130.2742	90.91%	49.20%

=== Semi Auto Standard ===
The iron sighted Standard division had the second largest match participation with 130 registered competitors. Sami Hautamäki won Standard with a margin of almost 7 percent to Heikki Tikkanen, both from Finland. Kenneth Handberg from Norway took bronze with a score of 84.98%. Lady Senior and Grand Senior categories did not meet the minimum number of participants for recognition.

Individual

Overall	Competitor	Points	Overall Match Percent
Gold	(Finland) Sami Hautamäki	2359.8125	100.00%
Silver	(Finland) Heikki Tikkanen	2199.3362	93.20%
Bronze	(Norway) Kenneth Handberg	2005.3613	84.98%

Lady

Lady	Competitor	Points	Category Match Percent	Overall Match Percent
Gold	(Finland) Lilian Telanne	1679.8633	100.00%	71.19%
Silver	(United States) Reanna Kadic	1508.5903	89.80%	63.93%
Bronze	(United States) Candice Horner	1403.7588	83.56%	59.49%

Junior

Junior	Competitor	Points	Category Match Percent	Overall Match Percent
Gold	(Mongolia) Arig Naranbaatar	1202.3768	100.00%	50.95%
Silver	(Mongolia) Amir Naranbaatar	1184.8148	98.54%	50.21%
Bronze	(Mongolia) Tsovoo Altangerel	1118.9706	93.06%	47.42%

Senior

Senior	Competitor	Points	Category Match Percent	Overall Match Percent
Gold	(Finland) Sami Hautamäki	2359.8125	100.00%	100.00%
Silver	(Finland) Ilkka Siitonen	1816.6255	76.98%	76.98%
Bronze	(Estonia) Margus Riso	1801.8980	76.36%	76.36%

Super Senior

S. Senior	Competitor	Points	Category Match Percent	Overall Match Percent
Gold	(Norway) Sverre Idland	1292.6506	100.00%	54.78%
Silver	(Norway) Nils Lindbo	1269.3994	98.20%	53.79%
Bronze	(Estonia) Toomas Kutsar	1115.8263	86.32%	47.28%

=== Manual Action Bolt ===
Manual Action Bolt was the smallest division with only 21 competitors that was recognized under the current IPSC Rules As this division only had to fire half of the rounds of the semi auto divisions the maximum number of points available is only half of the semi auto divisions. All categories except Senior did not meet the minimum number of participants.

Individual

Overall	Competitor	Points	Overall Match Percent
Gold	(Mongolia) Dashdemberel Sodnomjamts	1183.3329	100.00%
Silver	(Norway) Håvar Hommelsgård	1097.7895	92.77%
Bronze	(Finland) Esa Laine	1069.5838	90.39%

Senior

Senior	Competitor	Points	Category Match Percent	Overall Match Percent
Gold	(Finland) Esa Laine	1069.5838	100.00%	90.39%
Silver	(Sweden) Dan Liljeström	978.5624	91.49%	82.70%
Bronze	(Greece) Ioannis Kouletsis	811.6701	75.89%	68.59%

=== Manual Action Contemporary ===
Manual Action Contemporary division missed IPSC recognition as it had only 11 competitors instead of the required minimum of 20. Therefore, no official world champion titles were issued this time.

Individual

Overall	Competitor	Points	Overall Match Percent
1st	(Australia) James Taylor	2174.6520	100.00%
2nd	(Italy) Paolo Zambai	2161.2885	99.39%
3rd	(Finland) Robert Josipovic	1988.0443	91.42%

== See also ==
- IPSC Rifle World Shoots
- IPSC Shotgun World Shoot
- IPSC Handgun World Shoots
- IPSC Action Air World Shoot
