= IPSC European Rifle Championship =

International sport shooting competition

The IPSC European Rifle Championship is an IPSC level 4 championship hosted every third year in Europe.

== History ==
- 2009 Hengsvann, Kongsberg, Norway
- 2012 Beliakovec, Veliko Tarnovo, Bulgaria
- 2015 Felsőtárkány, Bükk, Hungary
- 2018 Karlskoga, Sweden - Cancelled due to the 2018 Sweden wildfires

== Champions ==
The following is a list of current and past European IPSC Rifle champions.

=== Overall category ===
Year	Division	Gold	Silver	Bronze	Venue
2009	Open	(Finland) Raine Peltokoski	(Czech Republic) Václav Vinduska	(Finland) Jarkko Halminen	Kongsberg, Norway
2009	Standard	(Finland) Isto Hyyryläinen	(Finland) Mika Riste	(Finland) Mikko Kuisma	Kongsberg, Norway
2012	Open	(Finland) Raine Peltokoski	(Finland) Teemu Rintala	(Finland) Jarkko Laukia	Veliko Tarnovo, Bulgaria
2012	Standard	(Finland) Mika Riste	(Finland) Mikael Kaislaranta	(Finland) Mikko Kuisma	Veliko Tarnovo, Bulgaria
2015	Open	(Finland) Raine Peltokoski	(Finland) Teemu Rintala	(Finland) Jarkko Laukia	Felsőtárkány, Hungary
2015	Standard	(Finland) Sami Hautamäki	(Estonia) Madis Reier	(Estonia) Margu Riso	Felsőtárkány, Hungary
2015	Manual Open	(United Kingdom) Peter Starley	(Russia) Oleg Perfilev	(Russia) Vadim Dmitriev	Felsőtárkány, Hungary
2018		Cancelled due to the 2018 Sweden wildfires			Karlskoga, Sweden

=== Lady category ===
Year	Division	Gold	Silver	Bronze	Venue
2015	Open	(Italy) Irene Canetta	(Russia) Maria Gushchina	(Russia) Natalia Rumyantseva	Felsőtárkány, Hungary

=== Junior category ===
Year	Division	Gold	Silver	Bronze	Venue
2012	Open	(Finland) Ville Broman	(Greece) Sotirios-Thomas Zafeiridis	(Bulgaria) Radomir Bossev	Veliko Tarnovo, Bulgaria

=== Senior category ===
Year	Division	Gold	Silver	Bronze	Venue
2009	Open	(Denmark) Kim Snerup Nielsen	(Sweden) Wilhelm Backlund	(Czech Republic) Lumir Safranek	Kongsberg, Norway
2012	Open	(Italy) Enri Botturi	(Germany) Claus Rothweiler	(Italy) Maurizio Rovey	Veliko Tarnovo, Bulgaria
2012	Standard	(Finland) Ilkka Kervinen	(Czech Republic) Tibor Ladic	(Germany) Thomas Sturm	Veliko Tarnovo, Bulgaria
2015	Open	(Sweden) Johan Hansen	(Sweden) Johan Lindberg	(Italy) Fabrizio Pesce	Felsőtárkány, Hungary
2015	Standard	(Estonia) Armin Meesit	(Finland) Mikael Kaislaranta	(Norway) Sverre Idland	Felsőtárkány, Hungary

=== Super senior category ===
Year	Division	Gold	Silver	Bronze	Venue
2015	Open	(Italy) Massimo Corazzini	(Switzerland) Peter Kressibucher	(France) Joel Gerard	Felsőtárkány, Hungary

== See also ==
- IPSC Nordic Rifle Championship
- IPSC European Handgun Championship
- IPSC European Shotgun Championship
