= IPSC Finnish Shotgun Championship =

Shooting sports in Finland

The IPSC Finnish Shotgun Championship is an IPSC level 3 championship held once a year by the Finnish Shooting Sport Federation.

== Champions ==
The following is a list of current and previous champions.

=== Overall category ===
| Year | Division | Gold | Silver | Bronze | Venue |
|---|---|---|---|---|---|
| 2009 | Open | (Finland) Seppo Nurmi | (Finland) Niku Vainio | (Finland) Pieti Marjavaara | |
| 2009 | Modified | (Finland) Jari Rastas | (Finland) Mika Riste | (Finland) Jani Lehtonen | |
| 2009 | Standard | (Finland) Raine Peltokoski | (Finland) Petri H Runtti | (Finland) Juha Niemelä | |
| 2009 | Standard Manual | (Finland) Ari Matero | (Finland) Mikael Ekberg | (Finland) Matti Mikkola | |
| 2010 | Open | (Finland) Petri Runtti | (Finland) Antti Saar | (Finland) Marko Pousi | |
| 2010 | Modified | (Finland) Juha Niemelä | (Finland) Jari Rastas | (Finland) Mikael Kaislaranta | |
| 2010 | Standard | (Finland) Raine Peltokoski | (Finland) Jarkko Laukia | (Finland) Panu Peltonen | |
| 2010 | Standard Manual | (Finland) Roger Karp | (Finland) Ari Matero | (Finland) Mikael Ekberg | |
| 2011 | Open | (Finland) Niku Vainio | (Finland) Juha Niemelä | (Finland) Vesa Vasara | |
| 2011 | Modified | (Finland) Petri Runtti | (Finland) Jari Rastas | (Finland) Jani Lehtonen | |
| 2011 | Standard | (Finland) Raine Peltokoski | (Finland) Jarkko Laukia | (Finland) Jussi Niskanen | |
| 2011 | Standard Manual | (Finland) Mikko Kivelä | (Finland) Mikael Ekberg | (Finland) Ari Matero | |
| 2013 | Open | (Finland) Jani Lehtonen | (Finland) Lauri Nousiainen | (Finland) Vesa Vasara | |
| 2013 | Modified | (Finland) Olli-pekka Partanen | (Finland) Jari Rastas | (Finland) Harri Svensk | |
| 2013 | Standard | (Finland) Jarkko Laukia | (Finland) Teemu Rintala | (Finland) Mika Riste | |
| 2013 | Standard Manual | (Finland) Ari Matero | (Finland) Matti Mikkola | (Finland) Kim Leppänen | |

=== Senior category ===
| Year | Division | Gold | Silver | Bronze | Venue |
|---|---|---|---|---|---|
| 2011 | Open | (Finland) Harri Ylinen | (Finland) Timo Salminen | (Finland) Rolf Leppänen | |

== See also ==
- IPSC Finnish Handgun Championship
- IPSC Finnish Rifle Championship
- IPSC Finnish Tournament Championship
- IPSC Finnish Action Air Championship
