= Teemu Rintala =

Finnish sport shooter

Teemu J Rintala
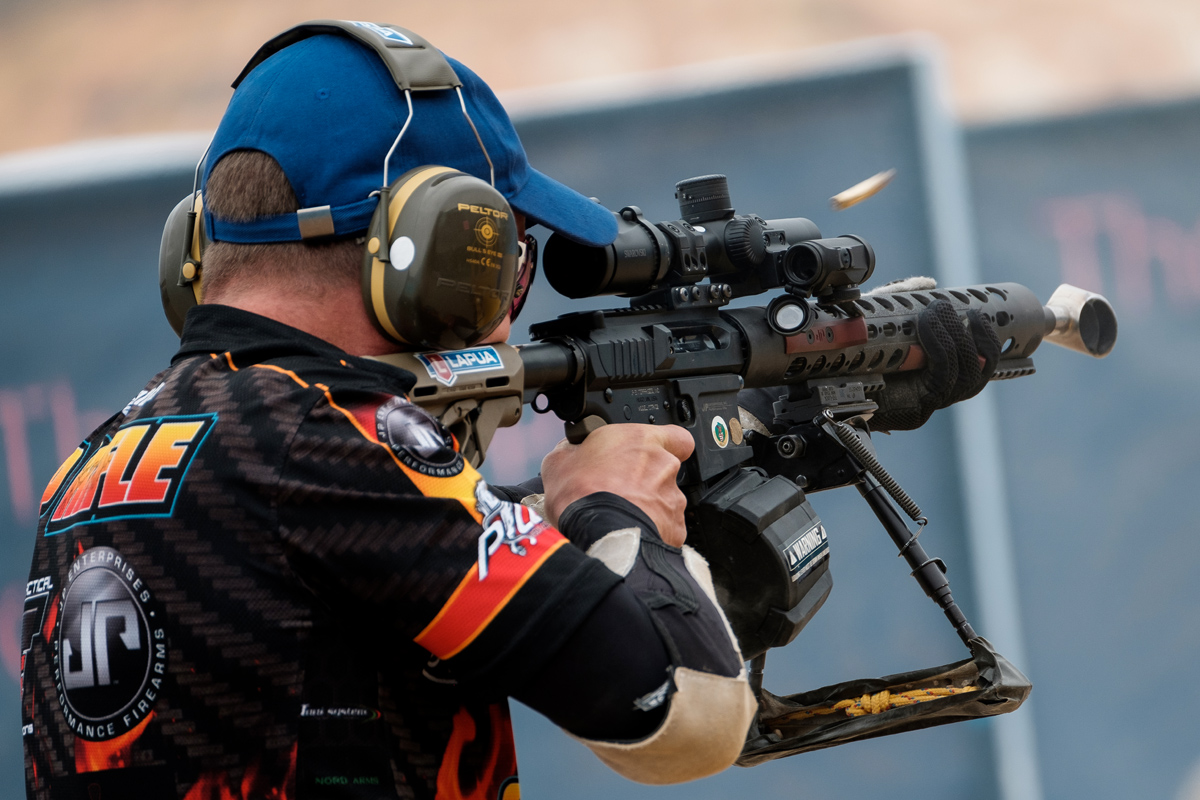
- Teemu Rintala at the 2017 IPSC Rifle World Shoot in Moscow, Russia

Personal information
- Nationality: (Finland) Finnish
- Occupation(s): IPSC shooter, arborist

Sport
- Team: Astro Sweden Rifle Team
Medal record
IPSC
Representing Finland
IPSC Rifle World Shoot
Gold medal – first place	2017 Moscow	Open
IPSC European Rifle Championship
Silver medal – second place	2012 Veliko Tărnovo	Open
Silver medal – second place	2015 Bükk	Open
IPSC Nordic Rifle Championship
Bronze medal – third place	2014 Finland	Open
Gold medal – first place	2016 Snillfjord	Open
Silver medal – second place	2018 Hanko	Standard
IPSC Finnish Rifle Championship
Silver medal – second place	2012	Open
Bronze medal – third place	2014	Open
Silver medal – second place	2015	Open
IPSC Shotgun World Shoot
Bronze medal – third place	2015 Agna	Standard
Gold medal – first place	2018 Châteauroux	Modified
IPSC Finnish Shotgun Championship
Silver medal – second place	2013	Standard

Teemu Rintala is a Finnish sport shooter who is the former IPSC Rifle World Champion in the Open division from the 2017 IPSC Rifle World Shoot and Shotgun World Champion in the Modified division from the 2018 IPSC Shotgun World Shoot. He also has a bronze medal from the 2015 IPSC Shotgun World Shoot. Rintala has been one of the top IPSC Rifle and Shotgun shooters in Europe the last couple of years having placed well in the last Finnish, Nordic and European championships. Rintala shoots for Astro Sweden Rifle Team (formerly GP Rifle Team), and alongside the shooting he works as an arborist.
