= Raine Peltokoski =

Finnish sport shooter

Raine J. Peltokoski
Personal information
- Nationality: (Finland) Finnish
- Occupation: IPSC shooter

Sport
- Team: Lapua / JP Enterprice
Medal record
IPSC
Representing Finland
IPSC Rifle World Shoot
Silver medal – second place	2017	Open
Silver medal – second place	2019	Open
Bronze medal – third place	2024	Open
IPSC European Rifle Championship
Gold medal – first place	2009 Hengsvann	Open
Gold medal – first place	2012 Veliko Tărnovo	Open
Gold medal – first place	2015 Bükk	Open
IPSC Finnish Rifle Championship
Bronze medal – third place	2005	Open
Gold medal – first place	2006	Open
Silver medal – second place	2007	Open
Gold medal – first place	2008	Open
Gold medal – first place	2009	Open
Gold medal – first place	2010	Open
Gold medal – first place	2011	Open
Gold medal – first place	2012	Open
Gold medal – first place	2014	Open
IPSC Shotgun World Shoot
Silver medal – second place	2015	Standard
IPSC European Shotgun Championship
Silver medal – second place	2006	Standard
IPSC Finnish Shotgun Championship
Bronze medal – third place	2000	Standard
Silver medal – second place	2002	Standard
Silver medal – second place	2004	Standard
Gold medal – first place	2007	Open
Gold medal – first place	2008	Standard
Gold medal – first place	2009	Standard
Gold medal – first place	2010	Standard
Gold medal – first place	2011	Standard
IPSC Finnish Handgun Championship
Gold medal – first place	1993	Modified
Gold medal – first place	2005	Production
Bronze medal – third place	2006	Production
Bronze medal – third place	2007	Open
Bronze medal – third place	2008	Production
Gold medal – first place	2009	Open
Gold medal – first place	2010	Open
Gold medal – first place	2011	Open
Gold medal – first place	2012	Open
IPSC Finnish Tournament Championship
Gold medal – first place	2004	Open
Gold medal – first place	2007	Open
Gold medal – first place	2009	Open
Gold medal – first place	2010	Open
Gold medal – first place	2011	Open

Raine J. Peltokoski is a Finnish sport shooter who has won the IPSC European Rifle Championship three times (2009, 2012, 2015), and the IPSC European Shotgun Championship once (2006). Raine has two IPSC Rifle World Shoot silver medals from 2017 and 2019 and a bronze medal from 2024, all in the Open division. He is sponsored by Lapua ammunition and Armi Dallera Custom rifles. He also has 7 Finnish Rifle Championship gold medals (2006, 2008, 2009, 2011, 2012, 2014 and 2015), one silver medal (2007) and one bronze medal (2005).

Raine started competing actively in 1989, and took his first Finnish championship title in the Modified division at the 1993 IPSC Finnish Handgun Championship. He focused on pistol and shotgun competitions until 2005, when he also started to focus on the rifle discipline. From 2010 to 2012 he continuously led the Finnish practical shooting rankings with full 100% results in both Open pistol, Open rifle and Standard shotgun.

Raine is the father of renowned conductor, pianist, and composer, Tarmo Peltokoski.

== See also ==
- Teemu Rintala, Finnish sport shooter
- Josh Froelich, American sport shooter
