= IPSC Finnish Tournament Championship =

Sport shooting competition in Finland

The IPSC Finnish Tournament Championship is an IPSC level 3 Tournament championship held once a year by the Finnish Shooting Sport Federation.

== Champions ==
The following is a list of current and previous champions.

=== Overall category ===
Year	Division	Gold	Silver	Bronze	Venue
2004	Open	(Finland) Raine Peltokoski	(Finland) Petri H Runtti	(Finland) Hannu Uronen	
2004	Modified	(Finland) Marko Kervola	(Finland) Kristian Poikonen	(Finland) Jari Rastas	
2004	Standard	(Finland) Mikko Kuisma	(Finland) Ilkka Kervinen	(Finland) Ari Honkala	
2007	Open	(Finland) Raine Peltokoski			
2009	Open	(Finland) Raine Peltokoski			
2010	Open	(Finland) Raine Peltokoski			
2011	Open	(Finland) Raine Peltokoski			

== See also ==
- IPSC Finnish Handgun Championship
- IPSC Finnish Rifle Championship
- IPSC Finnish Shotgun Championship
