= IPSC Rifle World Shoots =

World Championship in Practical Rifle Shooting

Practical Rifle
- Classification: ICS (IPSC Classification System)
- Sport: Practical shooting
- Founded: In the 1970's
- Motto: "Diligentia, Vis, Celeritas" (DVC), Latin for "precision, power, speed"
- No. of teams: National teams
- Country: Over 100
- Venue: Shooting ranges
- Confederation: African, Australasian, European and Pan-American Zones
- Most recent champion: (Finland) Jarkko Laukia (2019)
- Qualification: Region dependent number of slots. Regional selection procedures.
- Level on pyramid: 5
- Domestic cup: National championships
- Related competitions: IPSC Handgun, Shotgun and Action Air World Shoots
- Website: ipsc.org
- 2024 IPSC Rifle World Shoot

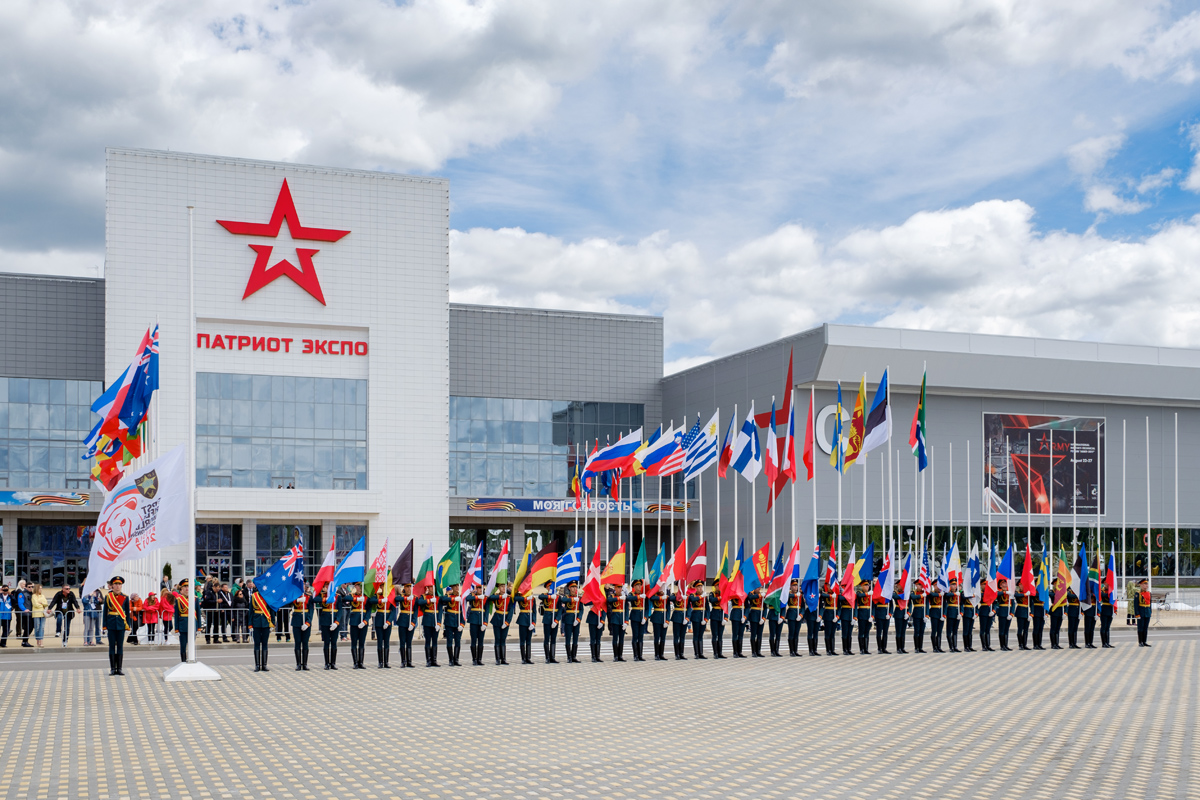
The opening ceremony at the 2017 IPSC Rifle World Shoot in Russia.

The IPSC Rifle World Shoot is the highest level rifle match within the International Practical Shooting Confederation (IPSC) which consists of several days and at least 30 separate courses of fire. The Rifle World Shoots are held triennially on a rotational cycle with the other two main IPSC disciplines Handgun and Shotgun.

== History ==
The first Rifle World Shoot was originally scheduled to be held in 2006 in Denmark, but was postponed and later cancelled due to difficulty in arranging enough long range stages. South Africa later expressed interest in hosting the event, but did not put forward a bid. In 2009 Norway hosted the first European Rifle Championship with most of the top competitors from America, Europe and the rest of the world present. Norway afterwards intended to bid for hosting the first Rifle World Shoot in 2013, but had to withdraw the bid due to financial reasons and lack of facilities. Russia then successfully bid in 2013 to host the first IPSC Rifle World Shoot in 2016, and planned to hold the competition at the newly constructed shooting range in Patriot Park near Moscow, an ideal range for such a large competition. In order to finish the construction of the new shooting range IPSC approved to reschedule the inaugural championship to 2017. The first IPSC Rifle Championship was therefore held in June 2017. The second IPSC Rifle World Shoot has been awarded to Sweden, and was hosted in Karlskoga during August 2019.

=== List of Rifle World Shoots ===
The following is a list of previous and future World Shoots:

- 2017 Rifle World Shoot, at the Patriot Park, Moscow, Russia.
- 2019 Rifle World Shoot, in Karlskoga, Sweden.
- 2024 Rifle World Shoot, in Liminka, Finland
- 2027 Rifle World Shoot, in Mongolia

== Individual Champions ==
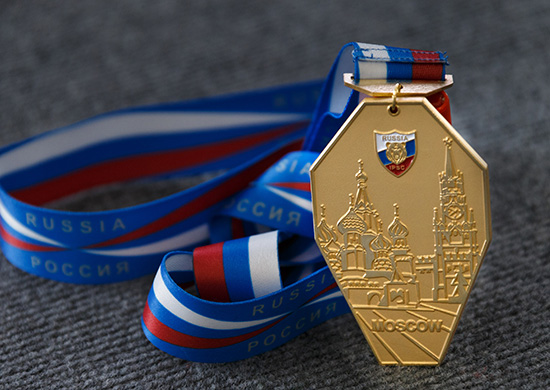
The Gold Medal of the 2017 IPSC Rifle World Shoot.

=== Overall category ===
Year	Division	Gold	Silver	Bronze	World Shoot
2017	Open	(Finland) Teemu Rintala	(Finland) Raine Peltokoski	(Finland) Jarkko Laukia	World Shoot I
2017	Standard	(Norway) Håvard Østgaard	(Finland) Sami Hautamäki	(Finland) Timo Vehvilainen	World Shoot I
2017	Manual Open	(Russia) Roman Khalitov	(Russia) Egor Khramov	(Sweden) Erik Bjaelkvall	World Shoot I
2017	Manual Standard	(Russia) Vladimir Chamyan	(Russia) Andrei Kirisenko	(Russia) Vladimir Novikov	World Shoot I
2019	Open	(Finland) Jarkko Laukia	(Finland) Raine Peltokoski	(Russia) Vadim Mikhailov	World Shoot II
2019	Standard	(Finland) Sami Hautamäki	(United States) Joseph Easter	(Norway) Håvard Østgaard	World Shoot II
2019	Manual Open	(Sweden) Jiro Nihei	(Sweden) Stilianos Simeonidis	(Sweden) Erik Bjälkvall	World Shoot II
2019	Manual Standard	(Russia) Vladimir Chamyan	(Russia) Vladimir Yakovlev	(Russia) Andrei Kirisenko	World Shoot II
2024	Open	(United States) Kyle Litzie	(Norway) Eirik Larsen	(Finland) Raine Peltokoski	World Shoot III
2024	Standard	(Finland) Sami Hautamäki	(Finland) Heikki Tikkanen	(Norway) Kenneth Handberg	World Shoot III
2024	Manual Action Bolt	(Mongolia) Dashdemberel Sodnomjamts	(Norway) Håvar Hommelsgård	(Finland) Esa Laine	World Shoot III

=== Lady category ===
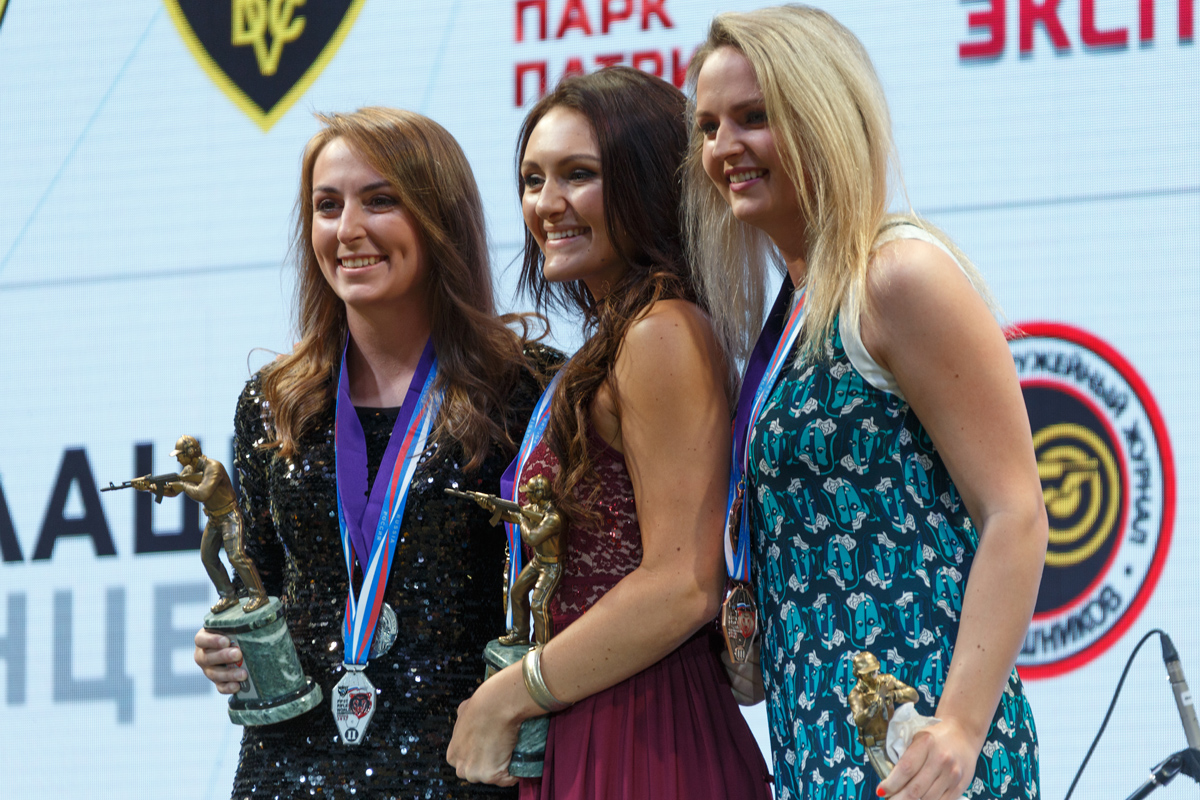
From left to right: Ashley Rheuark, Lena Miculek and Maria Gushchina.

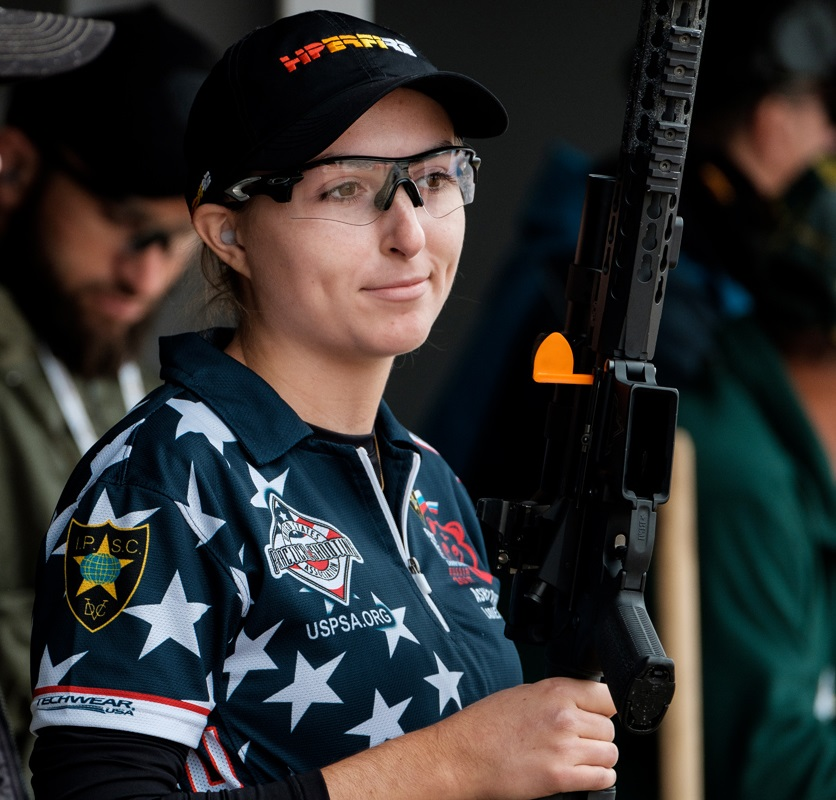
Ashley Rheuark at the 2017 IPSC Rifle World Shoot.

Year	Division	Gold	Silver	Bronze	World Shoot
2017	Open	(United States) Lena Miculek	(United States) Ashley Rheuark	(Russia) Maria Gushchina	World Shoot I
2017	Standard	(Russia) Anastasiya Tereshina	(Russia) Anna Puzyreva	(Russia) Elena Merkulova	World Shoot I
2017	Manual Open	(Russia) Alena Karelina	(Russia) Irina Perfileva	(Russia) Tatiana Korobeinik	World Shoot I
2017	Manual Standard	(Russia) Tatiana Isupova	(Kazakhstan) Olga Axyonkina	(Russia) Svetlana Kostromina	World Shoot I
2019	Open	(United States) Ashley Rheuark	(United States) Lena Miculek	(United States) Lanny Barnes	World Shoot II
2024	Open	(United States) Lena Miculek	(United States) Justine Williams	(Finland) Reetta Paavola	World Shoot III
2024	Standard	(Finland) Lilian Telanne	(United States) Reanna Kadic	(United States) Candice Horner	World Shoot III

=== Lady Senior category ===
Year	Division	Gold	Silver	Bronze	World Shoot
2024	Open	(Sweden) Pia Clerté	(Italy) Irene Canetta	(Finland) Elina Karhunen	World Shoot III

=== Junior category ===
Year	Division	Gold	Silver	Bronze	World Shoot
2017	Open	(Russia) Andrei Kalinin	(Russia) Albert Gladkovskiy	(Russia) Dmitry Novikov	World Shoot I
2019	Open	(United States) Riley Kropff	(Russia) Dmitry Novikov	(Russia) Georgy Shkoda	World Shoot II
2024	Open	(Sweden) Hugo Rinaldo	(Slovakia) Samuel Ščepko	(Finland) Ukko Nikki	World Shoot III
2024	Standard	(Mongolia) Arig Naranbaatar	(Mongolia) Amir Naranbaatar	(Mongolia) Tsovoo Altangerel	World Shoot III

=== Senior category ===
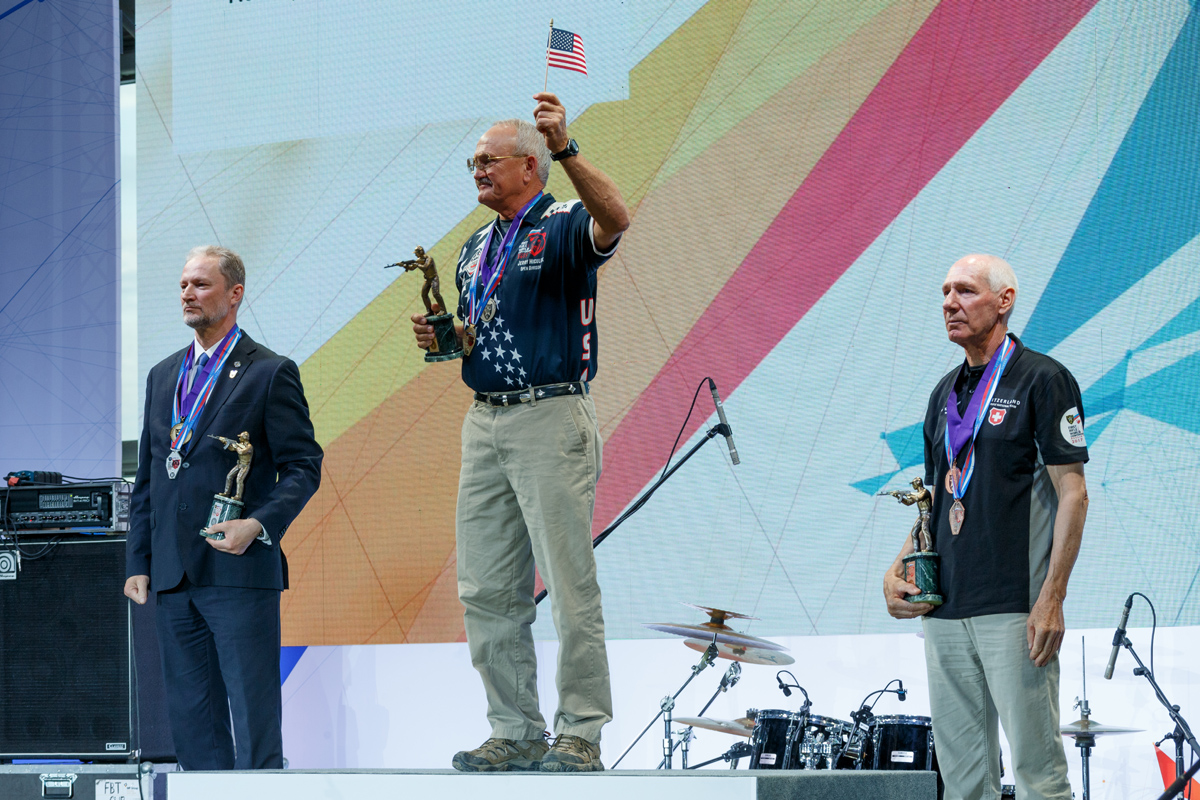
Jerry Miculek on top of the podium for the Open Division Super Senior category at the 2017 IPSC Rifle World Shoot.

Year	Division	Gold	Silver	Bronze	World Shoot
2017	Open	(United States) Jose Vidanes	(Estonia) Armin Meesit	(United States) Jeffrey Cramblit	World Shoot I
2017	Standard	(Finland) Mikael Kaislaranta	(Slovakia) Jan Palka	(Russia) Vitaly Konev	World Shoot I
2017	Manual Open	(Russia) Ramazan Mubarakov	(Russia) Evgeny Efimov	(Italy) Fabio Egidio Fossati	World Shoot I
2019	Open	(Slovakia) Ernest Nagy	(United States) Jose Vidanes	(Italy) Dario Forlani	World Shoot II
2019	Standard	(United States) Kelly Neal	(Finland) Ilkka Siitonen	(Russia) Vitaly Konev	World Shoot II
2019	Manual Open	(Italy) Paolo Zambai	(Russia) Aleksandr Ivashko	(Sweden) Dan Liljeström	World Shoot II
2024	Open	(Finland) Raine Peltokoski	(Finland) Jarkko Laukia	(Norway) Kjetil Edvardsen	World Shoot III
2024	Standard	(Finland) Sami Hautamäki	(Finland) Ilkka Siitonen	(Estonia) Margus Riso	World Shoot III
2024	Manual Action Bolt	(Finland) Esa Laine	(Sweden) Dan Liljeström	(Greece) Ioannis Kouletsis	World Shoot III

=== Super Senior category ===
Year	Division	Gold	Silver	Bronze	World Shoot
2017	Open	(United States) Jerry Miculek	(Finland) Pertti Karhunen	(Switzerland) Peter Kressibucher	World Shoot I
2019	Open	(United States) Jerry Miculek	(Finland) Pertti Karhunen	(Finland) Ilkka Kervinen	World Shoot II
2024	Open	(United States) Linwood Jarrett	(United States) Jerry Miculek	(Sweden) Johan Hansen	World Shoot III
2024	Standard	(Norway) Sverre Idland	(Norway) Nils Lindbo	(Estonia) Toomas Kutsar	World Shoot III

=== Grand Senior category ===
Year	Division	Gold	Silver	Bronze	World Shoot
2024	Open	(Italy) Massimo Corazzini	(South Africa) Irving Stevenson	(Switzerland) Peter Kressibucher	World Shoot III

== Teams ==
=== Overall teams ===
Year	Division	Gold	Silver	Bronze	World Shoot
2017	Open	Finland	Russia	Norway	World Shoot I
2017	Standard	Finland	Norway	Russia	World Shoot I
2019	Open	Finland	United States	Russia	World Shoot II
2024	Open	United States	Norway	Finland	World Shoot III
2024	Standard	Finland	United States	Norway	World Shoot III
2024	Manual Action Bolt	Mongolia	Norway	Greece	World Shoot III

=== Lady teams ===
Year	Division	Gold	Silver	Bronze	World Shoot
2017	Open Lady	United States	Russia	Finland	World Shoot I
2024	Open	United States	Finland	Sweden	World Shoot III
2024	Standard	Finland	USA	Mongolia	World Shoot III

=== Junior teams ===
Year	Division	Gold	Silver	Bronze	World Shoot
2024	Open	Finland	Norway	Austria	World Shoot III

=== Senior teams ===
Year	Division	Gold	Silver	Bronze	World Shoot
2017	Open Senior	United States	Sweden	Italy	World Shoot I
2024	Open	Finland	Norway	United States	World Shoot III
2024	Open	Finland	Germany	Norway	World Shoot III

=== Super Senior teams ===
Year	Division	Gold	Silver	Bronze	World Shoot
2024	Open	United States	Finland	Italy	World Shoot III

== See also ==
- IPSC Handgun World Shoots
- IPSC Shotgun World Shoots
- IPSC Action Air World Shoots
- List of world sports championships
