= 2018 Sweden wildfires =

Wildfires in Sweden during mid-2018

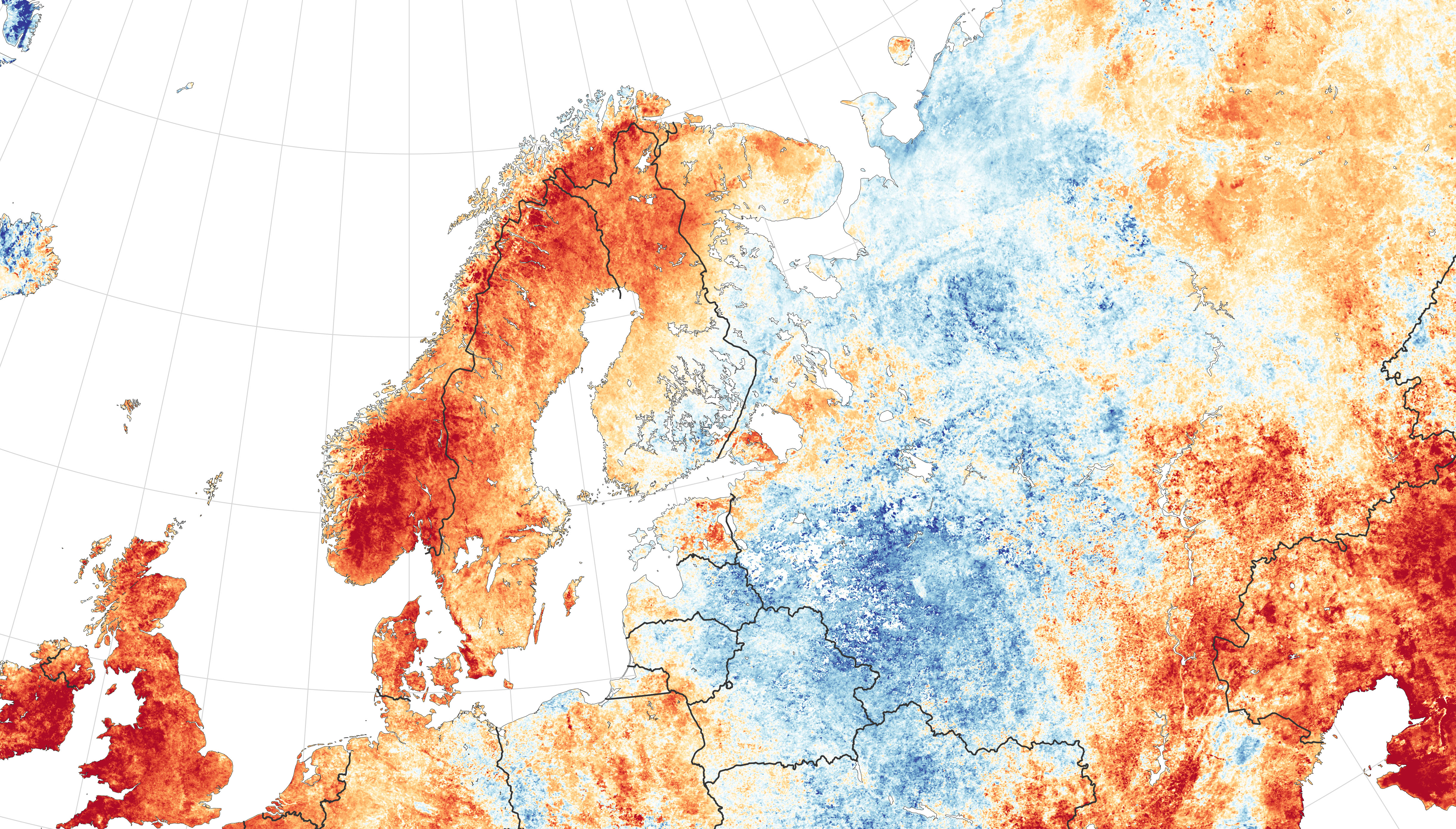
- Scandinavia temperature anomaly map, July 1–15, 2018 (NASA)
- Date: May – August 2018 (peak in July)

Statistics
- Total fires: c. 50 — as of 23 July
- Total area: 250 km^{2} (100 sq mi) — as of 23 July

Impacts
- Deaths: 0

In the summer of 2018, a large number of wildfires (primarily forest fires) occurred throughout much of Sweden. According to the Swedish Civil Contingencies Agency, they are the most serious in the country in modern history. The summer was unusually warm and dry, significantly raising the risk of fire. Firefighters from multiple countries were involved in fighting the fires. Many people were evacuated from their homes, but there were no fatalities.

== Heatwave and cause of fire ==
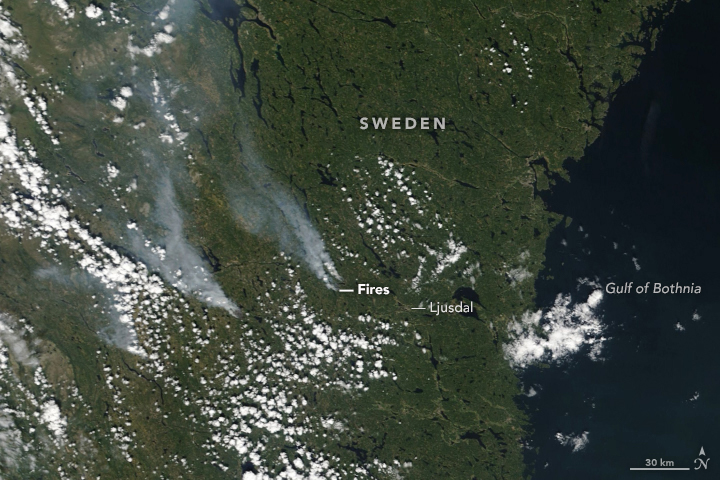
Satellite picture of the wildfires near Ljusdal

Sweden experienced an unusually long heatwave and had only 13 mm (0.51 in) of rain from the beginning of May to late July. May 2018 was the warmest May and July 2018 was the warmest July ever recorded in Sweden. As of mid-July, temperatures in Scandinavia were more than 10 °C (18 °F) above normal.

Several of the fires were started by people using disposable barbecues, despite temporary bans on their usage put in place due to the dry weather conditions. Some were started by lightning strikes.

Wildfires also occurred in the neighbouring countries Denmark, Finland and Norway, but no casualties due to wildfires were reported in Scandinavia.

== Timeline ==
The first significant wildfires in Sweden were recorded in May, and by 23 July there were more than fifty, covering 250 km^{2} (100 sq mi). The fires were distributed throughout much of Sweden, ranging from north of the Arctic Circle to the southernmost county of Scania. The largest areas lost to fire are in Gävleborg and Jämtland, each 85 km^{2} (33 sq mi), followed by Dalarna at 25 km^{2} (10 sq mi) and Västernorrland at 5 km^{2} (2 sq mi). Based on data from the last decade, the expected number of wildfires in July would be three. It is highly unusual for areas of this size to be affected by wildfires (both individual fires and total size of all), but historically there have been larger, notably in 1888 where 2,000 km^{2} (770 sq mi) burned.

Most affected areas in 2018 have relatively low human population densities, but it was still necessary to evacuate many people from several villages. In areas not under risk of fire but affected by smoke thousands of people were asked to stay indoors and close their windows.

In addition to the country's firefighters and civilian volunteers, Sweden's armed forces were involved, mostly providing manpower and equipment such as helicopters. Locally the air force also used aerial bombings by JAS 39 Gripen fighter jets to make firebreaks and draw oxygen from the wildfires.

By June, several fires were out of control and Sweden requested help from neighbouring countries and via the European Union's Civil Protection Mechanism. Sweden received help from Denmark (firefighters and equipment), Estonia (firefighters and equipment), France (soldiers, firefighters, water bombing aircraft), Finland (firefighters), Germany (firefighters, helicopters), Italy (water bombing aircraft), Lithuania (helicopter), Norway (firefighters and equipment, water bombing helicopters), Poland (firefighters and equipment), and Portugal (water bombing aircraft).

In late July, Sweden received its first significant rain in months. Combined with firefighting, this meant that fires generally were reduced, although new ones continued to appear. This, along with the high risk of fire elsewhere in Europe, meant that firefighters from most countries had returned to their own countries by 30 July, although the Danish remained on active duty in Sweden into August. Some water bombing aircraft returned to their own countries, but others remained in Sweden.

== 2019 ==
In March, several wildfires occurred in the south of Sweden. According to the Swedish Civil Contingencies Agency, the risk of fire was unusually high for the time of year.
