= SRA-shooting =

Shooting sport based around military scenarios

- Highest governing body: International Military Shooting Federation
- Nicknames: SRA
- Developed: 1980s–1990s, Finland

Characteristics
- Contact: No
- Type: Action shooting
- Equipment: Rifle, pistol, shotgun, sniper rifle

Presence
- Country or region: Mainly Finland
- Olympic: No
- World Championships: No
- Paralympic: No
- World Games: No

SRA-shooting (Finnish: Sovellettu Reserviläisammunta, lit. 'applied reservist shooting') is an action shooting sport focused on weapons skills useful for military reservists. SRA competitors shoot stages formulated around imaginary combat situations that require firing on multiple targets, movement and magazine changes, thus emulating weapons handling skills required in military scenarios. The stages are non-standardized and can be themed around, for example, clearing a room or manning a checkpoint. The stages can also include non-shooting elements such as evacuating simulated wounded persons. The scoring emphasizes speed and accuracy.

The weapons used in SRA are (usually semi-automatic) rifle, pistol, shotgun, and sniper rifle, with a focus on the rifle and to a lesser degree on the pistol. Military gear is either allowed or required depending on the class a participant competes in. As of 2025, competitors in the TST class are required to wear a minimum of 12 kilograms (26 lb) of gear, including a chest rig, a flak jacket or a plate carrier, military-style clothing, a first aid kit, a knife, and at least one 1 litre (0.26 US gal) of water.

Depending on the source, the sport was developed in Finland either in the 1980s or the 1990s, but surged in popularity following the 2022 Russian invasion of Ukraine with the number of Finnish hobbyists doubling from 2017 to 2024. As of August 2025, the number of registered SRA shooters in Finland was approximately 15 000, with a further 4000 shooters in Sweden and 1000 in Estonia. According to the Finnish Reservist Sports Federation, the sport's raise in popularity in Finland is limited by the federation's ability to provide safety courses and shooting tests required from newcomers and the limited number of shooting ranges suitable for the sport.

The rules of the sport are regulated by the International Military Shooting Federation. The federation was founded in November 2023 by the Finnish Reservist Sports Federation, the Finnish Reservists' Association, the Finnish Reserve Officers' Federation and the Defence Guilds' Federation of Finland. In Finland, individuals participate in the sport through reservists' or national defence associations, but participation does not require being an actual military reservist.

In addition to Finland, the sport is also practiced in Estonia, Sweden, Ukraine and Switzerland. A similar sport called Tillämpat tjänsteskytte (TTS) is also practiced in Sweden, with changes to align the rules with Swedish Army regulations.
