= Mongolian Practical Shooting Association =

Sports organization of Mongolia

Mongolian Practical Shooting Federation
- Монголын Практик Буудлагын Холбоо
- Legal status: Sport federation
- Headquarters: Ulaanbaatar, Mongolia
- President: Naranbaatar Dorjpagma
- Parent organization: International Practical Shooting Confederation
- Website: https://ipsc.mn/

The Mongolian Practical Shooting Federation (Mongolian: Монголын Практик Буудлагын Холбоо in Mongolian Cyrillic) is one of the region of Mongol for practical shooting under the International Practical Shooting Confederation. The founder of the federation is Naranbaatar Dorjpagma, the regional director of IPSC.

The sport of IPSC was first introduced into Mongolia in 2009, by Naranbaatar Dorjpagma. Despite the limited resources available at that time, the sport was highly praised by enthusiastic sportsmen and sportswomen. Before Mongolian Practical Shooting Federation (MPSF) was officially founded, much assistance was received from Naranbaatar's friend Vitaly Kryuchin and IPSC international in the areas of training and coaching.

Since then, qualified shooters from the club have participated in a series of international IPSC shooting events. To further promote the sport of IPSC in Mongolia, the MPSF was officially joined to IPSC in 2012.

The first event of MPSF was the Level III handgun match "Mongolian Open". The match had been organized five times since 2013.

The first higher level match, had participated Mongolian practical shooters was Far East Handgun Championship 2015, Malaysia. MPSF sent two shooters on Standard division.

And the first success of higher level match was IPSC Rifle World Shoot 2017, Russia. Mongolian shooters won four bronze medals by team results. MPSF sent 5 teams, 20 shooters to the match.

The Manual Action Open division had the third largest match participation with 52 competitors. The Mongolian team of men and women both won two bronze medals on this division.

The Manual Action Standard division had 29 competitors. And the Mongolian team of men and women both won two bronze medals also.

Last year Mongolian practical shooters participated Far East Handgun Championship 2018, Thailand, MPSF sent two teams, eight men for the Handgun division of Standard and Production to the match. And MPSF also sent two teams, eight men for the action air division of Standard and Production to Action Air World Shoot 2018, Hong Kong.

MPSF organizes 12-15 matches annually in Mongolia, such as national championships of practical shooting sport. Most of the matches are during national holidays. Of course one of that matches, is "Mongolian Open" handgun Level III match. Also, the practical shooting competition named "5.11 Challenge", sponsoring by 5.11 Tactical, is a popular practical shooting event in Mongolia.
