= Roman Khalitov =

Russian competition shooter

Roman R. Khalitov
Personal information
- Nationality: Russian
- Occupation: IPSC shooter
Medal record
IPSC
Representing Russia
IPSC Rifle World Shoot
Gold medal – first place	2017	Manual Open
IPSC Shotgun World Shoot
Silver medal – second place	2015	Open
IPSC Russian Shotgun Championship
Gold medal – first place	2015	Open
Silver medal – second place	2016	Open
Bronze medal – third place	2017	Open
Gold medal – first place	2018	Open
IPSC Russian Handgun Championship
Silver medal – second place	2015	Open
IPSC Russian PCC Championship
Gold medal – first place	2022	Open
Silver medal – second place	2021	Open

Roman Khalitov is a Russian competition shooter who took gold at the 2017 IPSC Rifle World Shoot in the Manual Open division and silver at the 2015 IPSC Shotgun World Shoot in the Open division. At the 2018 IPSC Shotgun World Shoot he placed fifth in the Open division with a 94.19 % score. He also has four podium finishes from the IPSC Russian Shotgun Championship (2015, 2016, 2017 and 2018), IPSC Russian PCC Championship (2022), and silver medals from the IPSC Russian Handgun Championship (2015) and IPSC Russian PCC Championship (2021).

== See also ==
- Josh Froelich, American sport shooter
- Kim Leppänen, Finnish sport shooter
