= Roberto Vezzoli =

Italian sport shooter

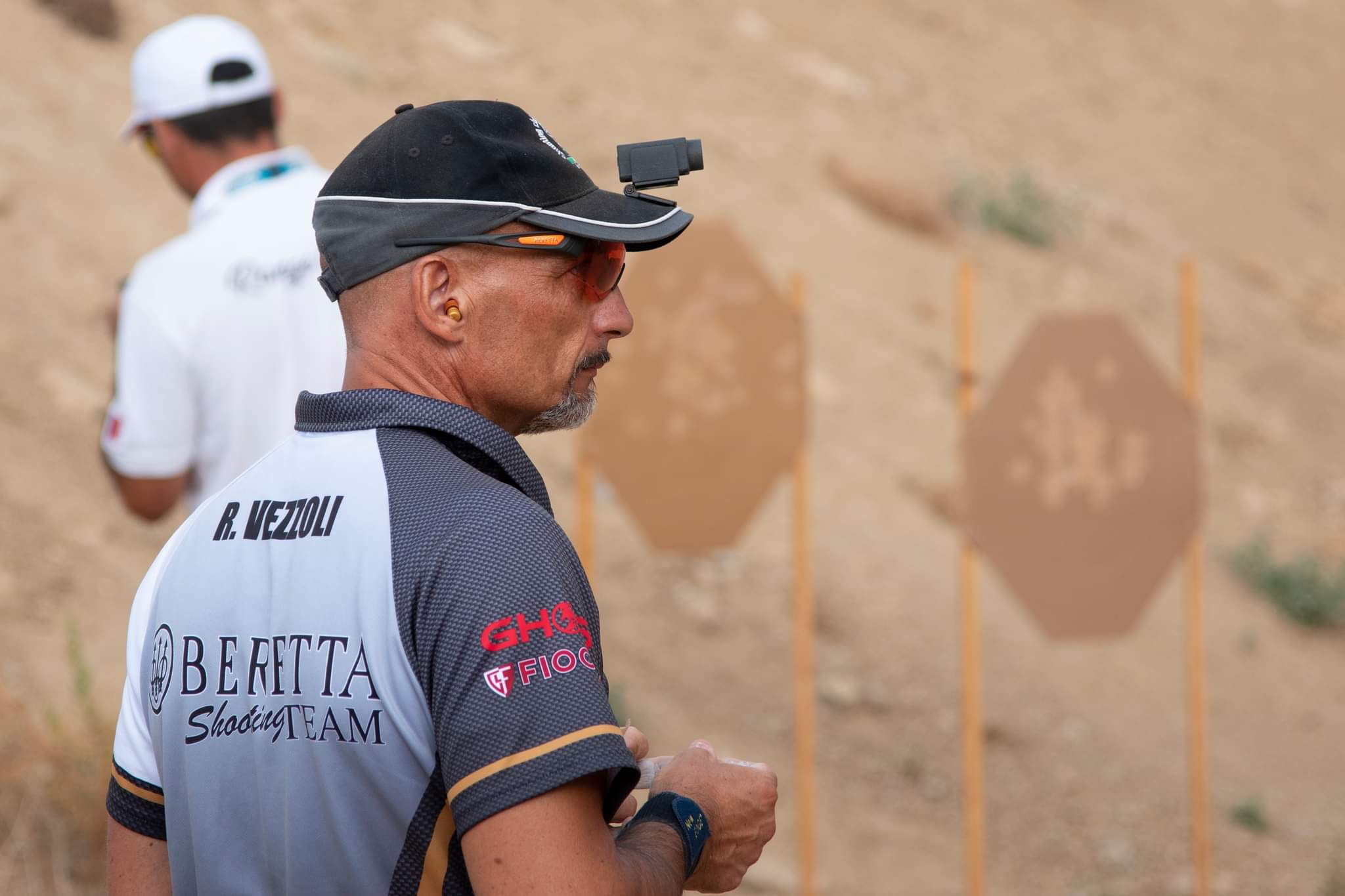
- Roberto Vezzoli
Medal record
IPSC
Representing Italy
IPSC Shotgun World Shoots
Silver medal – second place	2012 Debrecen	Standard
Gold medal – first place	2015 Agna	Standard
Bronze medal – third place	2018 Châteauroux	Modified
IPSC European Shotgun Championship
Gold medal – first place	2003 Terni	Standard
Bronze medal – third place	2006 Kavala	Standard
Silver medal – second place	2009 Oparany	Standard
IPSC European Handgun Championship
Bronze medal – third place	2010 Belgrade	Modified
Silver medal – second place	2013 Barcelos	Classic

Roberto Vezzoli is an Italian sport shooter who won the 2015 IPSC Shotgun World Shoot Standard division title. At the IPSC European Handgun Championship he took bronze in the Modified division in 2010, and silver in the Classic division in 2013. He also has a total of five Italian championship titles. He is the Beretta Shooting Team Handgun captain from 2018 and he was involved in the development of Beretta 92X Performance.

== See also ==
- Josh Froelich, American sport shooter
- Kim Leppänen, Finnish sport shooter
