= Joshua Kenny (sport shooter) =

British sport shooter

Medal record
IPSC
Representing Great Britain
IPSC Shotgun World Shoots
| Gold medal – first place | 2015 Agna | Junior Standard |
| Bronze medal – third place | 2018 Châteauroux | Standard |

Joshua Kenny is a British sport shooter who took bronze overall in the Standard division at the 2018 IPSC Shotgun World Shoot. Previously, at the 2015 IPSC Shotgun World Shoot he took the Standard division Junior category gold medal.

== Other merits ==
- UKPSA British Masters Champion 2015 and 2016.
- UK Junior Champion for consecutive years 2013, 2014 and 2015.
- British Open Champion 2015 and 2016.
- IPSC Central European Shotgun Open Champion 2016.

== See also ==
- Tim Yackley, American sport shooter
- Kim Leppänen, Finnish sport shooter
