= 2018 IPSC Shotgun World Shoot =

International sport shooting competition

- Venue: National Shooting Centre
- Location: Châteauroux, France
- Dates: Opening Ceremony: 3. June; Main Match: 4. June - 9. June; Shoot-Off: 10. June; Awards: 10. June
- Competitors: 656 from 39 nations
- Winning time: 1742.7157 of 2000 points

Medalists
gold medal	Standard (Largest Division) (Finland) Jarkko Laukia
silver medal	(Finland) Kim Leppänen
bronze medal	(United Kingdom) Joshua Kenny

The 2018 IPSC Shotgun World Shoot III was the third IPSC Shotgun World Shoot, and was held at the National Shooting Centre in Châteauroux, France between 3. and 10. June 2018.

== Champions ==
=== Open ===
The Open division had the second largest match participation with 212 out of 656 starting competitors (37.5%).

Individual

Overall	Competitor	Points	Overall Match Percent	
Gold	(United States) Josh Froelich	1801.0237	100.00 %	
Silver	(Czech Republic) Vaclav Vinduska	1736.3428	96.41 %	
Bronze	(Russia) Vladimir Kharitonov	1717.0401	95.34 %	
4th	(Russia) Roman Anikin	1706.6658	94.76 %	
5th	(Russia) Roman Khalitov	1696.4498	94.19 %	
6th	(Italy) Dario Forlani	1638.9792	91.00 %	
7th	(Finland) Lauri Nousiainen	1636.5605	90.87 %	
8th	(United States) Scott Greene	1631.5760	90.59 %	
9th	(Russia) Sergey Orlov	1624.6365	90.21 %	
10th	(Sweden) Johan Hansen	1615.6423	89.71 %	
Lady	Competitor	Points	Overall percent	Category percent
Gold	(Russia) Alena Karelina	1481.8206	82.28 %	100.00 %
Silver	(Italy) Irene Canetta	1379.0076	76.57 %	93.06 %
Bronze	(Russia) Maria Shvarts	1369.5567	76.04 %	92.42 %
Senior	Competitor	Points	Overall percent	Category percent
Gold	(Sweden) Johan Hansen	1615.6423	89.71 %	100.00 %
Silver	(United States) Jojo Vidanes	1513.5272	84.04 %	93.68 %
Bronze	(Italy) Luciano Todisco	1444.3688	80.20 %	89.40 %
Super Senior	Competitor	Points	Overall percent	Category percent
Gold	(Italy) Giovanni Liberti	1232.1103	68.41 %	100.00 %
Silver	(Greece) Apostolos Bechtsoudis	1183.7234	65.73 %	96.07 %
Bronze	(Germany) Michael Lautenschlager	1136.9836	63.13 %	92.28 %

Teams Open

Overall	Country	Points	Percent	Team members
Gold	Russia	5027.7521		Roman Anikin, Roman Khalitov, Sergey Orlov, Oleg Kudryavtsev
Silver	Thailand	4572.5596		Kachen Jeakkhachorn, Vatcharapon Charoendechkul, Supaksorn Sanprasit, Ratchaset Aitthiphongthawee
Bronze	Great Britain	4499.3320		Sam Crane, Adam Rowsell, Cansh Pope, Stuart Saunders
Lady	Country	Points	Percent	Team members
Gold	Russia	4162.8022		Alena Karelina, Maria Shvarts, Natalya Rumyantseva, Tatiana Korobeinik
Silver	United States	3500.5818		Lanny Barnes Siggins, Claudia Vidanes, Heather Miller, Sky Killian
Bronze	France	2518.7480		Anne Fournier, Christelle Pace, Delphine Bezot, Marie Therese Morais
Senior	Country	Points	Percent	Team members
Gold	Sweden	4184.1122		Johan Hansen, Stefan Ekstedt, Marianne Hansen, Dick Qvarnstrom
Silver	Italy	4025.4075		Luciano Todisco, Fabio Teodori, Giovanni Liberti, Massimo Corazzini
Bronze	Russia	3742.4879		Andrey Anashkin, Ramazan Mubarakov, Sergey Stepanov, Sergei Terentev

=== Standard ===
The Standard division had the largest match participation with 223 out of 656 starting competitors (39.5%).

Individual

Overall	Competitor	Points	Overall Match Percent	
Gold	(Finland) Jarkko Laukia	1742.7157	100.00 %	
Silver	(Finland) Kim Leppänen	1709.9764	98.12 %	
Bronze	(United Kingdom) Joshua Kenny	1695.7226	97.30 %	
4th	(United States) Brian Nelson	1658.8621	95.19 %	
5th	(Finland) Raine Peltokoski	1647.7351	94.55 %	
6th	(Finland) Pyry Laine	1612.3262	92.52 %	
7th	(United States) Timothy Yackley	1584.9006	90.94 %	
8th	(Russia) Ivan Romanov	1565.5045	89.83 %	
9th	(Thailand) Nattaphum Kamolwong	1538.8374	88.30 %	
10th	(Italy) Christian Remonato	1537.4860	88.22 %	
Junior	Competitor	Points	Overall percent	Category percent
Gold	(United States) Garrett Dietrich	1463.6451	83.99 %	100.00%
Silver	(Brazil) Lucas Roth	1294.5654	74.28 %	88.45%
Bronze	(United States) Nicholas Realuyo	1227.2135	70.42 %	83.85%
Lady	Competitor	Points	Overall percent	Category percent
Gold	(United States) Lena Miculek	1458.6063	83.70 %	100.00%
Silver	(United States) Dianna Muller	1240.7830	71.20 %	85.07%
Bronze	(United States) Dakota Overland	1232.6432	70.73 %	84.51%
Senior	Competitor	Points	Overall percent	Category percent
Gold	(Finland) Mika Riste	1525.9323	87.56 %	100.00%
Silver	(Ukraine) Ihor Zahurnyi	1467.1649	84.19 %	96.15%
Bronze	(Philippines) Raul Jr Tolentino	1350.8778	77.52 %	88.53%
Super Senior	Competitor	Points	Overall percent	Category percent
Gold	(Canada) Karl Blum	1140.1772	65.43 %	100.00%
Silver	(Germany) Bernd Wiessner	1125.6174	64.59 %	98.72%
Bronze	(Italy) Amedeo Sessa	1102.1764	63.24 %	96.67%

Teams Standard

Overall	Country	Points	Percent	Team members
Gold	Finland	5002.7770	100.00 %	Jarkko Laukia, Raine Peltokoski, Pyry Laine, Jussi Niskanen
Silver	United States	4775.4665	95.46 %	Brian Nelson, Timothy Yackley, Aaron Hayes, Daniel Earnest
Bronze	Great Britain	4671.3482	93.38 %	Joshua Kenny, Jon Axe, Mark Sienesi, Darren Hopley
Lady	Country	Points	Percent	Team members
Gold	United States	3893.7304	100.00 %	Lena Miculek, Dianna Muller, Rebecca Yackley, Katelyn Francis
Silver	Russia	3247.3432	83.40 %	Tatiana Romashina, Maria Kireytseva, Daria Reveruk, Mariia Ustiuzhaninova
Bronze	Great Britain	2664.1302	68.42 %	Michelle Lumley, Faye Williamson, Sharon Sell, Caroline Askew
Senior	Country	Points	Percent	Team members
Gold	Ukraine	4034.4669	100.00 %	Ihor Zahurnyi, Yuriy Nahirnyak, Igor Lytvynenko, Andriy Matsekh.
Silver	Italy	3920.4141	97.17 %	Marco Fuin, Danilo Mainardi, Pierluigi Andreato, Amedeo Sessa
Bronze	Finland	3813.9751	94.53 %	Mika Riste, Mikael Ekberg, Teijo Lehtinen, Wilhelm Backlund.

=== Standard Manual ===
The Standard Manual division had the third largest match participation with 127 out of 656 starting competitors (22.5%).

Individual

Overall	Competitor	Points	Overall Match Percent	
Gold	(Finland) Jaakko Viitala	1829.7789	100.00 %	
Silver	(Russia) Pavel Orlov	1728.1561	94.45 %	
Bronze	(Russia) Yury Nikolaev	1686.4713	92.17 %	
4th	(Finland) Teemu Potkonen	1633.1211	89.25 %	
5th	(Finland) Juha Lukkarila	1627.6942	88.96 %	
6th	(Russia) Anton Sarabskiy	1564.0944	85.48 %	
7th	(Czech Republic) Vit Helan	1548.9097	84.65 %	
8th	(Thailand) Chawaron Sutaphanit	1545.1794	84.45 %	
9th	(Sweden) Teddi Sorensson	1538.2639	84.07 %	
10th	(Ukraine) Vitalii Pedchenko	1535.9251	83.94 %	
Lady	Competitor	Points	Overall percent	Category percent
Gold	(Italy) Alessandra Moro	1016.2500	55.54 %	100.00 %
Silver	(Australia) Arnya Olsen	854.0766	46.68 %	84.04 %
Bronze	(Brazil) Cândida Tatian Balestiere Vargas	776.4457	42.43 %	76.40 %
Senior	Competitor	Points	Overall percent	Category percent
Gold	(Italy) Davide Bellini	1382.8604	75.58 %	100.00 %
Silver	(Italy) Luigi Silvestroni	1379.5389	75.39 %	99.76 %
Bronze	(United Kingdom) Iain Guy	1379.5237	75.39 %	99.76 %
Super Senior	Competitor	Points	Overall percent	Category percent
Gold	(Finland) Matti Mikkola	1182.3499	64.62 %	100.00 %
Silver	(Germany) Lothar Ring	1099.3536	60.08 %	92.98 %
Bronze	(Thailand) Thanapol Kuichairatana	1037.7095	56.71 %	87.77 %

Teams Standard Manual

Overall	Country	Points	Percent	Team members
Gold	Finland	5090.5942	100.00 %	Jaakko Viitala, Teemu Potkonen, Juha Lukkarila, Matti Mikkola
Silver	Russia	4978.7218	97.80 %	Pavel Orlov, Yury Nikolaev, Anton Sarabskiy
Bronze	Thailand	4519.0753	88.77 %	Chawaron Sutaphanit, Sunchaipat Udomamornratn, Jirasak Jeensavage, Chukiat Kaewfajarroen
Senior	Country	Points	Percent	Team members
Gold	Italy	4137.9108	100.00 %	Davide Bellini, Luigi Silvestroni, Paolo Zambai, Saverio Martella,
Silver	Great Britain	3748.0512	90.58 %	Iain Guy, Michael Flatley, Conor Kenneally, Ken Trail
Bronze	Netherlands	2823.5982	68.24 %	John Kwekkeboom, Marcel Slim, Rob Kisters, Peter Goeseije

=== Modified ===
The Modified division had the fourth largest match participation with 94 out of 656 starting competitors (16.6%). The division saw Teemu Rintala put on a dominating performance winning with a margin of over 150 points and pushing the nearest competitor Sami Hautamäki in second place down to a Match Percent of 91.83%.

Individual

Overall	Competitor	Points	Overall Match Percent	
Gold	(Finland) Teemu Rintala	1863.0263	100.00 %	
Silver	(Finland) Sami Hautamäki	1710.7966	91.83 %	
Bronze	(Italy) Roberto Vezzoli	1709.6522	91.77 %	
4th	(Serbia) Nikola Mihajlovic	1669.5395	89.61 %	
5th	(Philippines) Edcel John Gino	1648.6764	88.49 %	
6th	(Serbia) Igor Jankovic	1608.0887	86.32 %	
7th	(Finland) Time Vehvilainen	1601.0229	85.94 %	
8th	(Russia) Alexander Voyno	1600.1757	85,89 %	
9th	(Serbia) Goran Jankovic	1595.8740	85.66 %	
10th	(Greece) Georgios Filippou	1534.5872	82.37 %	
Lady	Competitor	Points	Overall percent	Category percent
Gold	(France) Margaux Nycz	1255.2733	67.38 %	100.00%
Silver	(Philippines) Janice Navato	1212.5878	65.09 %	96,60 %
Bronze	(Thailand) Chanyanuch Parkyam	1162.1119	62.38 %	92.58 %
Senior	Competitor	Points	Overall percent	Category percent
Gold	(Finland) Mikael Kaislaranta	1531.6101	82.21 %	100.00 %
Silver	(Serbia) Branislav Raketic	1385.0866	74.35 %	90.43 %
Bronze	(Italy) Eduardo Roberto Buticchi	1376.8128	73.90 %	89.89 %

Teams Modified

Overall	Country	Points	Percent	Team members
Gold	Finland	5174.8458	100.00 %	Teemu Rintala, Sami Hautamäki, Timo Vehvilainen, Mikael Kaislaranta
Silver	Serbia	4873.5022	94.18 %	Nikola Mihajlovic, Igor Jankovic, Goran Jankovic, Branislav Raketic
Bronze	Russia	4529.9428	87.54 %	Alexander Voyno, Alexey Voyno, Viktor Lisimenko, Vladimir Chamyan
Lady	Country	Points	Percent	Team members
Gold	Philippines	3455.7130	100.00 %	Janice Navato, Lydia Cuyong, Jannette Gonzaga Mona Lisa Dela Rosa
Silver	Thailand	3156.3221	91.34 %	Chanyanuch Parkyam, Siriwan Thongkham, Pornnatchar Suntiasvaraporn, Sutisa Keawtong
Bronze	United States	2373.2619	68.68 %	Ursula Williams, Julie Waasted, Audra Brown

== Medal table (individual) ==
Rank	Country	Gold	Silver	Bronze	Total
1	Finland	6	2	0	8
2	Italy	3	2	4	9
3	United States	3	2	2	7
4	Russia	1	1	3	5
5	Germany	0	2	1	3
6	Brazil	0	1	1	2
6	Philippines	0	1	1	2
8	Great Britain	0	0	2	2
9	Thailand	0	0	2	2
10	Sweden	1	0	0	1
10	Canada	1	0	0	1
10	France	1	0	0	1
13	Czech Republic	0	0	1	1
13	Greece	0	0	1	1
13	Ukraine	0	0	1	1
13	Australia	0	0	1	1
13	Serbia	0	0	1	1
	Total	16	11	21	48

== Shoot-Off side event ==
The shoot-off side event was an audience friendly one-against-one elimination cup held on 10 June, the day after the Main Match was finished. The top overall finishing athletes from the Main Match as well as the top category athletes in each division were eligible for qualification.

The final in the Open division shoot-off came down to an extremely small margin, with the contenders firing each of their shots almost simultaneously. The decisive hit on the last popper came down to tactics. U.S. shooter Scott Greene had chosen the most aggressive choke, which increased his risk of missing, but ultimately caused his plate to fall down faster.

Division	Category	Gold	Silver	Bronze
Open	Overall	(United States) Scott Greene	(Russia) Roman Anikin	(Russia) Vladimir Kharitonov
Open	Lady	(Russia) Olga Nurlatova	(Russia) Maria Shvarts	(Russia) Natalya Rumyantseva
Open	Senior	(Sweden) Johan Hansen	(Sweden) Stefan Ekstedt	(Italy) Luciano Todisco
Open	Super Senior	(France) Pierre Martin Privat	(Germany) Peter Kohz	(Italy) Sergio Faldetta
Standard	Overall	(Finland) Kim Leppänen	(Finland) Jarkko Laukia	(Finland) Raine Peltokoski
Standard	Lady	(United States) Lena Miculek	(United States) Diana Muller	(United States) Dakota Overland
Standard	Senior	(Italy) Marco Fuin	(Italy) Danilo Mainardi	(United Kingdom) Michael Siva-Jothy
Standard	Super Senior	(Ukraine) Andriy Matsekh	(Germany) Bernd Wiessner	(Canada) Karl Blum
Standard Manual	Overall	(Finland) Teemu Potkonen	(Russia) Yuri Nikolaev	(Russia) Pavel Orlov
Standard Manual	Lady	(Italy) Alessandra Moro	(Brazil) Fabricia Mendes Parmagnani	(Brazil) Candida Balestiere Vagas
Standard Manual	Senior	(Brazil) Henrique Backes	(Italy) Davide Bellini	(Italy) Paolo Zambai
Standard Manual	Super Senior	(Finland) Matti Mikkola	(Australia) John Bellman	(Thailand) Thanapol Kuichairatana
Modified	Overall	(Finland) Teemu Rintala	(Finland) Sami Hautamäki	(Italy) Roberto Vezzoli
Modified	Lady	(Philippines) Lydia Cuyong	(Philippines) Jannette Gonzaga	(Philippines) Janice Navato
Modified	Senior	(Finland) Mikael Kaislaranta	(Thailand) Thutivachra Thanupongvarich	(Italy) Eduardo Buticchi

== See also ==
- IPSC Handgun World Shoots
- IPSC Rifle World Shoots
- IPSC Action Air World Shoot
