= 2015 IPSC Shotgun World Shoot =

International sport shooting competition

2015 IPSC Shotgun World Shoot II
- Official logo of the 2015 IPSC Shotgun World Shoot
- Venue: Le Tre Piume
- Location: Agna, Italy
- Dates: Sunday 13. to Saturday 19. September 2015
- Competitors: 635 from 30 nations

Medalists
| gold medal | Standard (Largest Division) (Italy) Roberto Vezzoli |
| silver medal | (Finland) Raine Peltokoski |
| bronze medal | (Finland) Teemu Rintala |

The 2015 IPSC Shotgun World Shoot II held at the shooting range "Le Tre Piume" near Agna, Italy was the 2nd IPSC Shotgun World Shoot. The match consisted of 30 stages over 5 days and 635 competitors from 30 nations.

== Champions ==
=== Open ===
The Open division was the second largest division with 189 competitors (29.8 %).

Individual

| Overall | Competitor | Points | Overall Match Percent | |
|---|---|---|---|---|
| Gold | (Czech Republic) Vaclav Vinduska | 1932.2263 | 100.00% | |
| Silver | (Russia) Roman Khalitov | 1861.6257 | 96.35% | |
| Bronze | (Germany) Dirk Frey | 1843.7323 | 95.42% | |
| 4th | (Russia) Vsevolod Ilin | 1784.1131 | 92.33% | |
| 5th | (Russia) Sergey Ivanov | 1780.5708 | 92.15% | |
| 6th | (Russia) Vladimir Novikov | 1772.4249 | 91.73% | |
| 7th | (Ukraine) Vitalii Vasin | 1753.0053 | 90.72% | |
| 8th | (Czech Republic) Frantisek Bindik | 1716.7811 | 88.85% | |
| 9th | (Thailand) Kachen Jeakkhachorn | 1711.2116 | 88.56% | |
| 10th | (Finland) Lauri Nousiainen | 1709.9612 | 88.50% | |
| Lady | Competitor | Points | Overall percent | Category percent |
| Gold | (Russia) Alena Karelina | 1550.2089 | 80.23% | 100.00% |
| Silver | (Italy) Irene Canetta | 1534.7468 | 79.43% | 99.00% |
| Bronze | (Russia) Natalia Rumyantseva | 1454.5289 | 75.28% | 93.83% |
| Senior | Competitor | Points | Overall percent | Category percent |
| Gold | (Sweden) Stefan Ekstedt | 1691.7366 | 87.55% | 100.00% |
| Silver | (Italy) Luciano Todisco | 1688.4665 | 87.38% | 99.81% |
| Bronze | (Sweden) Johan Hansen | 1649.8692 | 85.39% | 97.53% |
| Super Senior | Competitor | Points | Overall percent | Category percent |
| 1st | (Italy) Amedeo Sessa | 1357.8199 | 70.27% | 100.00% |
| 2nd | (South Africa) Carlo Belletti | 1250.8200 | 64.73% | 92.12% |
| 3rd | (Italy) Massimo Corazzini | 1239.0787 | 64.13% | 91.26% |

Teams

| Overall | Country | Points | Percent | Team members |
|---|---|---|---|---|
| Gold | Russia | 5274.8585 | 100.00% | Roman Khalitov, Vsevolod Ilin, Ramazan Mubarakov, Andrei Kirisenko |
| Silver | Czech Republic | 5255.3884 | 99.63% | Vaclav Vinduska, Frantisek Bindik, Josef Rakusan, Milos Kazda |
| Bronze | Germany | 5043.4262 | 95.61% | Dirk Frey, Thomas Streit, Felix Frey, Gregory Midgley |
| Senior | Country | Points | Percent | Team members |
| Gold | Italy | 4670.9687 | 100.00% | Luciano Todisco, Fabrizio Pesce, Adriano Parisi, Giovanni Liberti |
| Silver | Germany | 4040.8958 | 86.51% | Matthias Gedeon, Michael Lautenschlager, Dietz-Rudolf Berndt, Thomas Heberer |
| Bronze | Russia | 4012.8182 | 85.91% | Evgeny Efimov, Aleksandr Volkov, Vasily Kurbatskikh, Andrey Anashkin |

=== Modified ===
The Modified division had 92 competitors (14.5 %).

Individual

| Overall | Competitor | Points | Overall Match Percent | |
|---|---|---|---|---|
| Gold | (Serbia) Nikola Mihajlovic | 2025.4158 | 100.00% | |
| Silver | (Serbia) Igor Jankovic | 1989.8886 | 98.25% | |
| Bronze | (Finland) Mikael Kaislaranta | 1981.3112 | 97.82% | |
| 4th | (Finland) Jani Lehtonen | 1878.6110 383 | 92.75% | |
| 5th | (Finland) Sami Hautamaki | 1865.5240 | 92.11% | |
| 6th | (Russia) Alexey Voyno | 1853.2876 | 91.50% | |
| 7th | (Finland) Timo Vehvilainen | 1816.9434 | 89.71% | |
| 8th | (Russia) Vladimir Chamyan | 1793.7982 | 88.56% | |
| 9th | (Serbia) Goran Jankovic | 1782.2507 | 87.99% | |
| 10th | (Finland) Olli-Pekka Partanen | 1723.6286 | 85.10% | |
| Senior | Competitor | Points | Overall percent | Category percent |
| Gold | (Finland) Mikael Kaislaranta | 1981.3112 | 97.82% | 100.00% |
| Silver | (Italy) Roberto Galgani | 1625.3332 | 80.25% | 82.03% |
| Bronze | (Serbia) Branislav Raketic | 1610.6726 | 79.52% | 81.29% |

Teams

| Overall | Country | Points | Percent | Team members |
|---|---|---|---|---|
| Gold | Serbia | 5797.5551 | 100.00% | Nikola Mihajlovic, Igor Jankovic, Goran Jankovic, Branislav Raketic |
| Silver | Finland | 5570.4638 | 96.08% | Mikael Kaislaranta, Sami Hautamaki, Olli-Pekka Partanen, Jari Rastas |
| Bronze | Russia | 5368.6339 | 92.60% | Alexey Voyno, Vladimir Chamyan, Alexander Venetskiy, Alexander Voyno |
| Senior | Country | Points | Percent | Team members |
| Gold | Italy | 4558.4697 | 100.00% | Roberto Galgani, Bruno La Bruna, Santo Bontempo, Renato Anese |
| Silver | Hungary | 4238.9626 | 92.99% | Geza Puskas, Zoltan Vincze, Gabor Varnai, Karoly Krizsan |
| Bronze | Thailand | 3788.3330 | 83.11% | Thanayot Changthong, Suchart Makchaiy, Chakrit Duendenfa, Prateep Worakunthada |

=== Standard ===
The Standard division was the largest division with 229 competitors (36.1 %).

Individual

| Overall | Competitor | Points | Overall Match Percent | |
|---|---|---|---|---|
| Gold | (Italy) Roberto Vezzoli | 1992.0174 | 100.00% | |
| Silver | (Finland) Raine Peltokoski | 1982.5585 | 99.53% | |
| Bronze | (Finland) Teemu Rintala | 1899.5883 | 95.36% | |
| 4th | (Finland) Jarkko Laukia | 1891.0595 | 94.93% | |
| 5th | (Russia) Ivan Romanov | 1776.0870 | 89.16% | |
| 6th | (Russia) Sergei Konov | 1747.6603 | 87.73% | |
| 7th | (Russia) Vasilii Plaksin | 1740.9351 | 87.40% | |
| 8th | (Estonia) Meelis Unt | 1695.1049 | 85.09% | |
| 9th | (Russia) Andrei Vikharev | 1666.2208 | 83.64% | |
| 10th | (Finland) Petri Runtti | 1665.1237 | 83.59% | |
| Lady | Competitor | Points | Overall percent | Category percent |
| Gold | (United States) Lena Miculek-Afentul | 1570.7017 | 78.85% | 100.00% |
| Silver | (United States) Dianna Muller | 1320.6841 | 66.30% | 84.08% |
| Bronze | (Germany) Sandra Schuh | 1172.8339 | 58.88% | 74.67% |
| Junior | Competitor | Points | Overall percent | Category percent |
| Gold | (United Kingdom) Joshua Kenny | 1653.6168 | 83.01% | 100.00% |
| Silver | (United States) Nathan Staskiewicz | 1593.2586 | 79.98% | 96.35% |
| Bronze | (United States) Tim Yackley | 1461.4431 | 73.36% | 88.38% |
| Senior | Competitor | Points | Overall percent | Category percent |
| Gold | (Germany) Klaus Moeller | 1455.9759 | 73.09% | 100.00% |
| Silver | (United States) Kurt Miller | 1415.7618 | 71.07% | 97.24% |
| Bronze | (Germany) Jochen Tuerk | 1376.2736 | 69.09% | 94.53% |
| Super Senior | Competitor | Points | Overall percent | Category percent |
| Gold | (Italy) Gavino Mura | 1073.6635 | 53.90% | 100.00% |
| Silver | (Argentina) Roberto Maritato | 1069.3033 | 53.68% | 99.59% |
| Bronze | (Italy) Sergio Fontanelli | 1063.8221 | 53.40% | 99.08% |

Teams

| Overall | Country | Points | Percent | Team members |
|---|---|---|---|---|
| Gold | Finland | 5773.2063 | 100.00% | Raine Peltokoski, Teemu Rintala, Jarkko Laukia, Mika Riste |
| Silver | Russia | 5154.8162 | 89.29% | Sergei Konov, Vasilii Plaksin, Andrei Vikharev, Maksim Skopin |
| Bronze | Italy | 5144.7945 | 89.12% | Roberto Vezzoli, Marcello D'Agostino, Andrea Bertelli, Marco Fuin |
| Lady | Country | Points | Percent | Team members |
| Gold | United States | 4044.0696 | 100.00% | Lena Miculek, Dianna Muller, Kay Miculek, Becky Yackley |
| Silver | Russia | 3226.8744 | 79.79% | Tatiana Romashina, Maria Kireytseva, Tatiana Panova |
| Bronze | Great Britain | 3137.6996 | 77.59% | Vanessa Duffy, Michelle Lumley, Josie Adam, Sharon Sell |
| Senior | Country | Points | Percent | Team members |
| Gold | Germany | 4080.9099 | 100.00% | Klaus Moeller, Jochen Tuerk, Bernd Wiessner, Josef Seiler |
| Silver | Italy | 3884.7025 | 95.19% | Livio Anticoli, Fernando Schiappa, Fabrizio Ferrario, Danilo Mainardi |
| Bronze | United States | 3641.2392 | 89.23% | Kurt Miller, Trapr Swonson, Michael Rush |

=== Standard Manual ===
The Manual division was the third largest division with 125 competitors (19.7 %).

Individual

| Overall | Competitor | Points | Overall Match Percent | |
|---|---|---|---|---|
| Gold | (Finland) Kim Leppänen | 2112.7419 | 100.00% | |
| Silver | (Finland) Jaakko Viitala | 1986.1461 | 94.01% | |
| Bronze | (Finland) Ari Matero | 1827.8107 | 86.51% | |
| 4th | (Italy) Luigi Silvestroni | 1798.3006 | 85.12% | |
| 5th | (Czech Republic) Vit Helan | 1796.7414 | 85.04% | |
| 6th | (Russia) Artem Mashechkov | 1789.8423 | 84.72% | |
| 7th | (Thailand) Chawaron Suthaphanit | 1782.4664 | 84.37% | |
| 8th | (Russia) Pavel Orlov | 1743.9340 | 82.54% | |
| 9th | (Russia) Yury Nikolaev | 1727.9645 | 81.79% | |
| 10th | (Slovenia) Martin Humar | 1724.7503 | 81.64% | |
| Senior | Competitor | Points | Overall percent | Category percent |
| Gold | (Italy) Davide Bellini | 1590.0781 | 75.26% | 100.00% |
| Silver | (Netherlands) Adrie De Bot | 1567.9095 | 74.21% | 98.61% |
| Bronze | (Brazil) Luiz Backes | 1480.8683 | 70.09% | 93.13% |
| Super Senior | Competitor | Points | Overall percent | Category percent |
| Gold | (Czech Republic) Lumir Safranek | 1270.3733 | 60.13% | 100.00% |
| Silver | (Germany) Lothar Ring | 1245.7734 | 58.96% | 98.06% |
| Bronze | (Italy) Massimo Grassi | 1035.6407 | 49.02% | 81.52% |

Teams

| Overall | Country | Points | Percent | Team members |
|---|---|---|---|---|
| Gold | Finland | 5926.6987 | 100.00% | Kim Leppänen, Jaakko Viitala, Ari Matero, Mikael Ekberg |
| Silver | Russia | 5199.2636 | 87.73% | Artem Mashechkov, Yury Nikolaev, Aleksandr Petukhov, Pavel Iakimov |
| Bronze | Italy | 5059.1977 | 85.36% | Luigi Silvestroni, Paolo Zambai, Samuele Conte, Giovanni Di Giulio |
| Senior | Country | Points | Percent | Team members |
| Gold | Netherlands | 3653.9680 | 100.00% | Adrie de Bot, John Kwekkeboom, Peter Goesije, Rob Kisters |
| Silver | Great Britain | 3487.0245 | 95.43% | Michael Flatley, Ade Sell, Ken Trail, Gary Dyer |
| Bronze | Poland | 3428.5480 | 93.83% | Slawomir Czauderna, Leszek Madajewski, Jurand Koput, Tadeusz Golab |

== See also ==
- IPSC Handgun World Shoots
- IPSC Rifle World Shoots
- IPSC Action Air World Shoots
