= Barbaataryn Enkhjargal =

Mongolian sports shooter

Personal information
- Nationality: Mongolian

Sport
- Sport: Practical shooting
Medal record
Women's Practical shooting
Representing Mongolia
IPSC World championships
Gold medal – first place	2025 Iloilo City	Air pistol

Barbaataryn Enkhjargal (Mongolian: Барбаатарын Энхжаргал) is a Mongolian sport shooter.

Enkhjargal held a winner title in the women's air pistol of the сlassic division at the 2025 IPSC World championships in Iloilo City, the Republic of the Philippines.The event featured over 400 athletes from 26 countries, with Mongolia fielding 26 participants across various divisions, highlighting Enkhjargal's standout performance in a highly competitive international field.
