= Joshua Kenny =

Joshua Kenny may refer to:

- Joshua Kenny (sport shooter)
- Joshua Kenny (rugby union)
