= ActionAirgun =

Action shooting sports game

ActionAirgun was a commercial action shooting sports game where competitors use standardized airsoft shooting kits to shoot special courses of fire and keep track of their scores online. It is a trademarked name of ActionAirgun LLC. As of November 23, 2016, the domain for the sport, actionairgun.com, has expired.

The format is modeled after several competitive shooting sports such as IDPA, IPSC and Cowboy Action Shooting ActionAirgun fills a niche as a low cost entry-level action shooting sport, as the equipment used are reproductions of actual firearms such as the M1911 pistol but which use CO_{2} to shoot 6 mm plastic BBs.

Individuals compete solo or are a member of a fireteam. Fireteams have up to five members. An individual can compete on both levels during each season. The portable shooting range is 8 by 16 ft (2.4 by 4.9 m). Spare rooms, garages, meeting rooms, basements, and gymnasiums have been used to set up a range. Courses of fire are a set of shooting instructions downloaded from the internet and used during the season to set up targets. Competition is between individuals or fireteam against fireteam. The rules of competition prohibit the modification of equipment. Everyone uses a standardized shooting kit. This sport places emphasis on the shooters skill.

Each year there are six seasons and each season is divided into six one-week stages. At the beginning of each stage competitors download courses of fire from the website. Each shooter has all week to practice and then enter their official shooting times before the next stage begins. Final results of the stage are kept secret until the beginning of the next stage. A database allows shooters from all over the world to compare their scores with other participants. During the sixth season the top competitors in the league are invited to a world championship.

== History ==
In Fall of 2001, W. Collins White, an avid shooter and gun enthusiast, came up with the concept of the sport. The idea was to allow for people to compete against each other by recording themselves completing courses set for them, and then uploading their results online. This sport would have been able to be played at one's home, provided there was ample space. This new sport used ‘airsoft’ equipment and be shot on a range that would fit in a spare room. This concept would eventually become into ActionAirgun.

As of November 23, 2016, the domain for the sport, actionairgun.com, has expired.

== Rules and regulations ==
The object of the sport is to shoot courses of fire as fast as possible. Based on outdoor shooting sports such as IPSC, IDPA and Cowboy Action Shooting, ActionAirgun competitions are held year round on indoor ranges. Using airsoft pistols, competitors download 3 courses of fire each week. During the week competitors practice and then upload their three best times to the website. At the conclusion of a week of shooting, competing members can review their scores and the scores of other competitors participating in the event. This weekly cycle continues for the duration of each 12-week season. Annual competition consists of three 12-week seasons and concludes with an invitational championship to determine the fastest shooter in the world.

Courses of fire are described as a set of shooting instructions. Each course of fire specifies how the shooting range will be configured. A typical course of fire includes, where the shooter stands and how they move, the number of targets and the order of fire, the arrangement of target stands, where the airgun will be located and with how many BBs. Some courses of fire may require the use of a second magazine of ammunition depending on the number of targets. In addition special items can be used such as, chairs, tables, boxes, other props.

Participants shot three courses of fire each week, shooting for the fastest times. The three best times were uploaded to the website where they are compiled. Scores for the week were kept secret until the end of the shooting week. Competitors then logged on to the website to view the rankings.

Penalties result in the addition of time to the base shooting score. Flagrant safety violations, modification of equipment or not following officials’ instructions can result in disqualification.

Each shooting year began in January. There are six 6-week seasons during the shooting year with approximately two-week breaks in between. Shooter's who performed well during the regular seasons could qualify for the championship. At the end of the regular shooting, top shooters would have been invited to compete in the ActionAirgun Championship Cup which was a live competition.

Ten polyurethane targets measuring 3 in × 2 in × 1 in (76 mm × 51 mm × 25 mm) are used as ‘shoot’ and ‘no-shoot’ targets. One side of the target is colored gold and represents a ‘shoot’ target. The other side of the target is colored red and represents a ‘no-shoot’ target. Targets are placed on one or two target stands. Target stands are 48 in × 18 in × 18 in (1,220 mm × 460 mm × 460 mm) (LxWxH). The top surface of each corrugated fiberboard target stand contains 68 3 in (76 mm) hexagonal target positions with 25 3 in (76 mm) hexagonal target positions on each end. Targets are placed in various patterns and the target stands can be configured in a large number of different ways.

The range is 8 feet (2.4 m) wide and 16 feet (4.9 m) long with a fabric backstop placed behind the target stands to stop BBs. At the up range end are three shooter boxes measuring 3 feet (0.91 m) deep and 32 inches (810 mm) wide.

== Equipment ==
The pistol used is an airsoft replica, patterned after the Colt M1911-A1. Unlike other real-steel and airsoft practical shooting sports which use highly customized handguns, modification of the airgun is against the rules. The pistol is powered by CO_{2}, and uses spherical 6mm BBs, with a weight of 0.20 grams. Separate magazines may be used, and take 26 BBs and contain a 12 gram CO_{2} charger.

In addition to the pistol, a ballistic nylon holster is worn by competitors.

A shot clock timer is worn on the wrist or held by a fellow shooter. The shot timer has buttons which start, review and reset the display. When activated, the timer will record the number of shots fired, the time between shots and elapsed time.

== Safety ==
ActionAirgun aimed to reinforce safe firearm practices, good shooting technique and encouraged participation in competitive shooting.

== Community ==
Competitors communicated with other members using an internet forum. There, shooters could organize events, provide tips and check up on the performance of competitors. Courses of fire were downloaded and official scores were uploaded to the database.

As this was a global sport, provision was made on the database for participants to compare their shooting with other shooters on a search able database of everyone else in the league.

== See also ==
- IPSC Action Air
