= IPSC Russian Rifle Championship =

The IPSC Russian Rifle Championship is an IPSC level 3 championship held once a year by the Russian Federation of Practical Shooting. In reaction to the 2022 Russian invasion of Ukraine, the IPSC cancelled all scheduled and future level 3 and above international competitions in Russia.

== Champions ==
The following is a list of current and previous champions.

=== Overall category ===
Year	Division	Gold	Silver	Bronze	Venue
2005	Open	(Russia) Nickolai Onshin	(Russia) Ivan Koshkin	(Russia) Alexey Krukov	
2005	Standard	(Russia) Aleksandr Scoruh	(Russia) Michael Guschin	(Russia) Sergey Schetinin	
2007	Open	(Russia) Sergey V Zemyakhin	(Russia) Alexandr A Abrosimov	(Russia) Ramazan B Mubarakov	
2007	Standard	(Russia) Oleg M Akhapkin	(Russia) Oleg V Salikov	(Russia) Albert Y Mursalimov	
2010	Open	(Russia) Andrey Kirisenko	(Russia) Igor Lebedev	(Russia) Ivan Koshkin	
2010	Standard	(Russia) Ivan Gladilkin	(Russia) Anatoliy Tolstikov	(Russia) Sergey Panov	
2011	Open	(Russia) Alexey V Ruzin	(Russia) Denis Shuppe	(Russia) Ivan S Koshkin	
2011	Standard	(Russia) Ivan Gladilkin	(Russia) Nikolay M Glagolev	(Russia) Denis A Fayustov	
2012	Open	(Russia) Andrey Kirisenko	(Russia) Alexander Lyubimov	(Russia) Vladimir Boyarkin	
2012	Standard	(Russia) Andrey Malishev	(Russia) Alexander Shutov	(Russia) Alexander Mishchuk	
2012	Manual Open	(Russia) Oleg Perfilyev	(Russia) Valentin Vlasenko	(Russia) R Bychkov	
2013	Open	(Russia) Gleb Svatikov	(Russia) Dmitry Semenov	(Russia) Andrei Indrikis	
2013	Standard	(Russia) Pavel Kononenko	(Russia) Sergei Votyakov	(Russia) Sergei Gusev	
2014	Open	(Russia) Alexander Petukhov	(Russia) Gleg Svatikov	(Russia) Victor Bojarkin	
2014	Standard	(Russia) Andrei Malyshev	(Russia) Dmitriy Shulepnikov	(Russia) Michail Klyuchnikov	
2014	Manual Open	(Russia) Oleg Perfilev	(Russia) Roman Bychkov	(Russia) Vadim Dmitriev	
2015	Open	(Russia) Gleb V Svatikov	(Russia) Mikhail A Ushakov	(Russia) Alexey V Pichugin	
2015	Standard	(Russia) Alexander S Shutov	(Russia) Denis A Fayustov	(Russia) Vitaliy N Konev	

=== Lady category ===
Year	Division	Gold	Silver	Bronze	Venue
2010	Standard	(Russia) Alla Popova	(Russia) Alyona Reva	(Russia) Darya Salkova	
2011	Standard	(Russia) Alena Reva	(Russia) Anastasiya N Akimova	(Russia) Mariya Maltseva	
2012	Standard	(Russia) Alena Reva	(Russia) Alla Popova	(Russia) Mariya Maltseva	
2014	Open	(Russia) Natalia Rumianceva	(Russia) Maria Sveshnikova	(Russia) Irina Perfileva	
2014	Standard	(Russia) Maria Shalimova	(Russia) Anna Zhuravleva	(Russia) Julia Mishenkova	
2015	Open	(Russia) Natalya V Rumyansteva	(Russia) Mariya A Sveshnikova	(Russia) Elena E Efimova	

=== Junior category ===
Year	Division	Gold	Silver	Bronze	Venue
2010	Standard	(Russia) Roman Zaitcev	(Russia) Nikolay Baranov	(Russia) Sergey Kondratenko	
2011	Standard	(Russia) Nikolay Baranov	(Russia) Anvar Tukhfatullin	(Russia) Mikhail Gilev	
2012	Standard	(Russia) Igor Lesnikh	(Russia) A Koloskov	(Russia) Anton Isakov	
2014	Standard	(Russia) Alexander Osaulenko	(Russia) Dmitry Matorin	(Russia) Fjodor Semionov	

=== Senior category ===
Year	Division	Gold	Silver	Bronze	Venue
2012	Open	(Russia) Sergey Sokolov	(Russia) Sergey Mikhaylov	(Russia) Pavel Evsevyev	
2015	Open	(Russia) Sergey V Tochilin	(Russia) Sergey V Sokolov	(Russia) Konstantin E Zasukhin	

== See also ==
- Russian Handgun Championship
- Russian Shotgun Championship
