= IPSC Russian Shotgun Championship =

Tanzanian

The IPSC Russian Shotgun Championship is an IPSC level 3 championship held once a year by the Russian Federation of Practical Shooting. In reaction to the 2022 Russian invasion of Ukraine, the IPSC cancelled all scheduled and future level 3 and above international competitions in Russia.

== Champions ==
The following is a list of current and previous champions.

=== Overall category ===
| Year | Division | Gold | Silver | Bronze | Venue |
|---|---|---|---|---|---|
| 2003 | Open | (Russia) Vitaly Kryuchin | (Russia) Alexander Sologub | (Russia) Vitaly Venzel | |
| 2004 | Open | (Russia) Vitaly Kryuchin | (Russia) Alexey Kryukov | (Russia) Victor Kostenko | |
| 2004 | Standard | (Russia) Alexander Sologub | (Russia) Nikolay Onshin | (Russia) Mikhail Letunov | |
| 2005 | Open | (Russia) Evgeny Efimov | (Russia) Artem Travkin | (Russia) Alexey Ragozin | |
| 2005 | Standard | (Russia) Kiril Avdeev | (Russia) Ramazan Mubarakov | (Russia) Andrey Viharev | |
| 2007 | Open | (Russia) Vladimir V Novikov | (Russia) Viatcheslav G Denisov | (Russia) Evgeniy Y Minakov | |
| 2007 | Modified | (Russia) Alexander I Petrov | (Russia) Denis B Tretyakov | (Russia) Evgeniy S Akulov | |
| 2007 | Standard | (Russia) Ramazan B Mubarakov | (Russia) Kirill V Avdeev | (Russia) Andrey I Vikharev | |
| 2007 | Standard Manual | (Russia) Alexey A Masliaev | (Russia) Alexander G Petukhov | (Russia) Fedor P Kruchkov | |
| 2008 | Open | (Russia) Vladimir V Novikov | (Russia) Evgeniy B Efimov | (Russia) Evgeniy Y Minakov | |
| 2008 | Modified | (Russia) Alexey Voino | (Russia) Evgeny Lukin | (Russia) Andrey V Petrov | |
| 2008 | Standard | (Russia) Vasiliy A Plaksin | (Russia) Sergey P Pushkov | (Russia) Andrey I Vikharev | |
| 2008 | Standard Manual | (Russia) Vitaliy Zamula | (Russia) Alexander G Petukhov | (Russia) Maxim Larin | |
| 2009 | Open | (Russia) Ivan S Koshkin | (Russia) Vsevolod V Ilin | (Russia) Evgeniy Y Minakov | |
| 2009 | Modified | (Russia) Ramazan B Mubarakov | (Russia) Alexey Voino | (Russia) Vladimir Chamian | |
| 2009 | Standard | (Russia) Andrey I Vikharev | (Russia) Vasiliy A Plaksin | (Russia) Pavel V Danilovitch | |
| 2009 | Standard Manual | (Russia) Alexander G Petukhov | (Russia) Maxim Larin | (Russia) Vitaliy Zamula | |
| 2010 | Open | (Russia) Viatcheslav Denisov | (Russia) Evgeniy Efimov | (Russia) Vsevolod Ilin | |
| 2010 | Modified | (Russia) Alexey Voino | (Russia) Alexander Voino | (Russia) Vladimir Chamian | |
| 2010 | Standard | (Russia) Sergey Konov | (Russia) Pavel Danilovich | (Russia) Sergey Shevchenko | |
| 2010 | Standard Manual | (Russia) Vitaliy Zamula | (Russia) Sergey Skvortcov | (Russia) Sergey Spivak | |
| 2011 | Open | (Russia) Ivan Koshkin | (Russia) Vsevolod Ilin | (Russia) Ramazan Mubarakov | |
| 2011 | Modified | (Russia) Aleksey Voyno | (Russia) Vladimir Chamyan | (Russia) Roman Myagkikh | |
| 2011 | Standard | (Russia) Vasiliy Plaksin | (Russia) Sergey Konov | (Russia) Kirill Avdeev | |
| 2011 | Standard Manual | (Russia) Sergey Skvortsov | (Russia) Vitaliy Zamula | (Russia) Oleg Salikov | |
| 2012 | Open | (Russia) Vladimir Novikov | (Russia) Sergey Orlov | (Russia) Ivan Koshkin | |
| 2012 | Modified | (Russia) Aleksey Voyno | (Russia) Vladimir Chamyan | (Russia) Aleksandr Voyno | |
| 2012 | Standard | (Russia) Pavel Danilovich | (Russia) Andrey Vikharev | (Russia) Sergey Konov | |
| 2012 | Standard Manual | (Russia) Aleksandr Petukhov | (Russia) Konstantin Shashin | (Russia) Artyem Mashechkov | |
| 2013 | Open | (Russia) Oleg Rybalkin | (Russia) Vsevolod Ilin | (Russia) Andrey Kirisenko | |
| 2013 | Modified | (Russia) Aleksandr Voyno | (Russia) Aleksandr Venetskiy | (Russia) Aleksey Voyno | |
| 2013 | Standard | (Russia) Vasiliy Plaksin | (Russia) Sergey Shevchenko | (Russia) Sergey Konov | |
| 2013 | Standard Manual | (Russia) Vitaliy Zamula | (Russia) Konstantin Shashin | (Russia) Pavel Kononenko | |
| 2014 | Open | (Russia) Ramazan B Mubarakov | (Russia) Vsevolod V Ilin | (Russia) Andrey V Kirisenko | |
| 2014 | Modified | (Russia) Aleksey A Voyno | (Russia) Aleksandr V Venetskiy | (Russia) Andrey I Gunichev | |
| 2014 | Standard | (Russia) Vasiliy A Plaksin | (Russia) Sergey A Konov | (Russia) Andrey I Vikharev | |
| 2014 | Standard Manual | (Russia) Pavel N Yakimov | (Russia) Aleksandr G Petukhov | (Russia) Yuriy V Nikolaev | |
| 2015 | Open | (Russia) Roman R Khalitov | (Russia) Vladimir V Kharitonov | (Russia) Sergey V Orlov | |
| 2015 | Modified | (Russia) Aleksey A Voyno | (Russia) Andrey I Gunichev | (Russia) Vladimir A Chamyan | |
| 2015 | Standard | (Russia) Maksim Y Skopin | (Russia) Sergey A Konov | (Russia) Andrey I Vikharev | |
| 2015 | Standard Manual | (Russia) Anton O Sarabskiy | (Russia) Denis V Zakharov | (Russia) Yuriy V Nikolaev | |
| 2016 | Open | (Russia) Roman B Anikin | (Russia) Roman R Khalitov | (Russia) Sergey V Orlov | |
| 2017 | Open | (Russia) Roman B Anikin | (Russia) Sergey V Orlov | (Russia) Roman R Khalitov | |
| 2018 | Open | (Russia) Roman R Khalitov | (Russia) Roman B Anikin | (Russia) Denis Yakovlev | |
| 2019 | Modified | (Russia) Sergey V Bessonov | (Russia) Denis A Korneev-Preobrazhenskiy | (Russia) Vladimir A Safonov | |
| 2019 | Standard | (Russia) Sergey A Konov | (Russia) Maksim Y Skopin | (Russia) Aleksey L Malanukha | |
| 2019 | Standard Manual | (Russia) Denis V Zakharov | (Russia) Anton V Urbanovich | (Russia) Yuriy V Nikolaev | |
| 2019 | Open | (Russia) Roman B Anikin | (Russia) Vladimir Subbotin | (Russia) Vladimir V Kharitonov | |

=== Lady category ===
| Year | Division | Gold | Silver | Bronze | Venue |
|---|---|---|---|---|---|
| 2013 | Open | (Russia) Alyena Karelina | (Russia) Mariya Shvarts | (Russia) Natalya Rumyantseva | |
| 2014 | Open | (Russia) Mariya V Shvarts | (Russia) Alyena V Karelina | (Russia) Tatyana Korobeynik | |
| 2015 | Open | (Russia) Alyena V Karelina | (Russia) Mariya V Shvarts | (Russia) Tatyana Korobeynik | |
| 2019 | Standard | (Russia) Mariya V Kireytseva | (Russia) Tatyana V Romashina | (Russia) Darya A Reveruk | |
| 2019 | Open | (Russia) Elena A Bobrusova-Deyviz | (Russia) Olga A Nurlatova | (Russia) Tatyana V Rykova | |

=== Senior category ===
| Year | Division | Gold | Silver | Bronze | Venue |
|---|---|---|---|---|---|
| 2014 | Open | (Russia) Ramazan B Mubarakov | (Russia) Evgeniy B Efimov | (Russia) Aleksandr M Volkov | |
| 2015 | Open | (Russia) Ramazan B Mubarakov | (Russia) Sergey A Terentev | (Russia) Mikhail A Ozerskiy | |

== See also ==
- Russian Handgun Championship
- Russian Rifle Championship
