= 2012 IPSC Shotgun World Shoot =

Shooting competition

2012 IPSC Shotgun World Shoot I
- Official logo of the 2012 IPSC Shotgun World Shoot
- Location: Debrecen, Hungary
- Competitors: 416

Medalists
gold medal	Standard (Largest Division) (Finland) Petri Henrik Ol Runtti
silver medal	(Italy) Roberto Vezzoli
bronze medal	(Russia) Sergei Konov

The 2012 IPSC Shotgun World Shoot I held in Debrecen, Hungary was the 1st IPSC Shotgun World Shoot, and consisted of 30 stages over 5 days and over 400 competitors.

== Champions ==
=== Open ===
The Open division was the second largest division with 121 competitors (29.1 %).

Individual

Overall	Competitor	Points	Overall Match Percent	
Gold	(Slovakia) Ivan Hos	1741.1528	100.00%	
Silver	(Ukraine) Oleksandr Shymchenko	1731.9022	99.47%	
Bronze	(Czech Republic) Josef Rakusan	1720.1566	98.79%	
4th	(Germany) Dirk Frey	1715.3494	98.52%	
5th	(United States) Jerry Miculek	1695.2535	97.36%	
6th	(Russia) Vladimir Novikov	1684.0335	96.72%	
7th	(Czech Republic) Vaclav Vinduska	1670.9271	95.97%	
8th	(Russia) Vsevolod Ilin	1650.9452	94.82%	
9th	(Czech Republic) Frantisek Bindik	1635.5216	93.93%	
10th	(Russia) Aleksandr Ilin	1629.4762	93.59%	
Lady	Competitor	Points	Overall percent	Category percent
1st	(Thailand) Malin Suebsuk	1010.0731	58.01%	100.00%
2nd	(Sweden) Elsa Marianne Hansen	944.5000	54.24%	93.51%
3rd	(Greece) Efstathia Chasogia	740.6015	42.53%	73.32%
Senior	Competitor	Points	Overall percent	Category percent
Gold	(United States) Jerry Miculek	1695.2535	97.37%	100.00%
Silver	(Italy) Mario Riillo	1551.6474	89.12%	91.53%
Bronze	(Russia) Ramazan Mubarakov	1510.7675	86.77%	89.12%
Super Senior	Competitor	Points	Overall percent	Category percent
1st	(Italy) Furio Liberti	1366.0489	78.46%	100.00%
2nd	(South Africa) Carlo Belletti	1345.0931	77.25%	98.47%
3rd	(United Kingdom) Michael John Scarlett	1077.2265	61.87%	78.86%

Teams

Place	Country	Points	Percent	Team members
Gold			100.00%	
Silver			%	
Bronze			%	

=== Modified ===
The Modified division had 63 competitors (15.1 %).

Individual

Overall	Competitor	Points	Overall Match Percent	
Gold	(Serbia) Igor Jankovic	1828.5279	100.00%	
Silver	(Finland) Jani Lehtonen	1768.3028	96.71%	
Bronze	(Serbia) Goran Jankovic	1752.6513	95.85%	
4th	(Serbia) Nikola Mihajlovic	1737.9070	95.04%	
5th	(Russia) Alexey Voyno	1676.2152	91.67%	
6th	(Serbia) Branislav Raketic	1671.1918	91.40%	
7th	(Russia) Alexander Venetskiy	1660.0254	90.78%	
8th	(Russia) Alexander Voyno	1646.5455	90.05%	
9th	(Hungary) Géza Puskás	1633.9317	89.36%	
10th	(Finland) Mikael Kaislaranta	1626.9052	88.97%	
Senior	Competitor	Points	Overall percent	Category percent
Gold	(Serbia) Branislav Raketic	1671.1918	91.40%	100.00%
Silver	(Italy) Enri Botturi	1470.1201	80.40%	87.97%
Bronze	(Italy) Amedeo Sessa	1311.4562	71.72%	78.47%

Teams

Place	Country	Points	Percent	Team members
Gold			100.00%	
Silver			%	
Bronze			%	

=== Standard ===
The Standard division was the largest division with 125 competitors (30 %).

Individual

Overall	Competitor	Points	Overall Match Percent	
Gold	(Finland) Petri Henrik Ol Runtti	1922.8117	100.00%	
Silver	(Italy) Roberto Vezzoli	1775.8605	92.36%	
Bronze	(Russia) Sergei Konov	1734.7196	90.22%	
4th	(Russia) Andreyi Vikharev	1714.1269	89.15%	
5th	(Russia) Pavel Danilovich	1683.1439	87.54%	
6th	(Finland) Mika Riste	1675.5117	87.14%	
7th	(Germany) Oliver Damm	1665.9784	86.64%	
8th	(Russia) Maksim Skopin	1656.0547	86.13%	
9th	(Russia) Sergey Shevchenko	1653.6985	86.00%	
10th	(Ukraine) Igor Zagurnyi	1653.0474	85.97%	
Lady	Competitor	Points	Overall percent	Category percent
Gold	(United States) Lena Miculek	1245.4565	64.77%	100.00%
Silver	(Germany) Sandra Schuh	1198.6707	62.34%	96.24%
Bronze	(United Kingdom) Vanessa Duffy	1162.6359	60.47%	93.35%
Junior	Competitor	Points	Overall percent	Category percent
1st	(Thailand) Aphisit Kaewmuangpet	1223.1650	63.61%	100.00%
2nd	(Switzerland) Timon Blattner	1189.8429	61.88%	97.28%
3rd	(Greece) Evangelos Gravanis	1094.7582	56.94%	89.50%
Senior	Competitor	Points	Overall percent	Category percent
Gold	(United States) Kurt Miller	1620.5004	84.2776	100.00%
Silver	(United States) Jeffrey Cramblit	1526.8547	79.41%	94.22%
Bronze	(Germany) Klaus Möller	1466.0845	76.25%	90.47%

Teams

Place	Country	Points	Percent	Team members
Gold			100.00%	
Silver			%	
Bronze			%	

=== Standard Manual ===
The Standard Manual division was the third largest division with 107 competitors (25.7 %).

Individual

Overall	Competitor	Points	Overall Match Percent	
Gold	(Finland) Hans Roger Karp	1804.1384	100.00%	
Silver	(Italy) Luigi Silvestroni	1770.1047	98.11%	
Bronze	(Russia) Aleksandr Petukhov	1755.4817	97.30%	
4th	(Finland) Ari Matero	1751.2625	97.07%	
5th	(Slovenia) Bostjan Pavlic	1707.9194	94.67%	
6th	(Italy) Paolo Zambai	1677.2953	92.97%	
7th	(Argentina) Christian Dario Moreira	1666.6445	92.38%	
8th	(Italy) Giovanni Di Giulio	1639.2848	90.86%	
9th	(Finland) Matti Kasurinen	1625.9580	90.12%	
10th	(Poland) Boguslaw Gaweda	1569.2340	86.98%	
Senior	Competitor	Points	Overall percent	Category percent
Gold	(Poland) Boguslaw Gaweda	1569.2340	86.98%	100.00%
Silver	(Finland) Jukka Matti Mikkola	1501.8644	83.25%	95.71%
Bronze	(Czech Republic) Lumir Safranek	1466.0033	81.26%	93.42%

Teams

Place	Country	Points	Percent	Team members
Gold			100.00%	
Silver			%	
Bronze			%	

== See also ==
- IPSC Handgun World Shoots
- IPSC Rifle World Shoots
- IPSC Action Air World Shoots
