= Lena Miculek =

American practical sport shooter (born 1995)

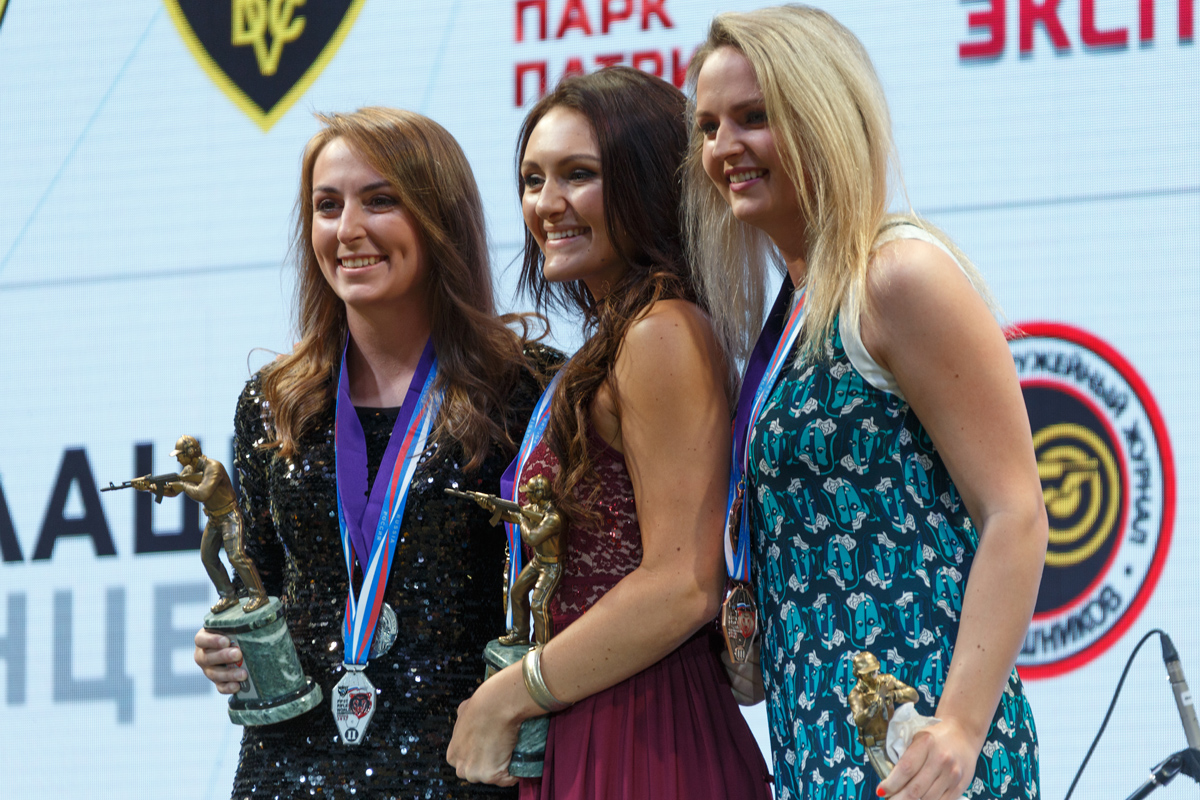
- Lena Miculek (in the middle) receiving the gold medal at the 2017 IPSC Rifle World Shoot

Personal information
- National team: United States
- Born: March 22, 1995 (age 31)
- Occupation: IPSC shooter
Medal record
IPSC
Representing United States
IPSC Rifle World Shoot
Gold medal – first place	2017 Moscow	Lady Open
Silver medal – second place	2019 Karlskoga	Lady Open
Gold medal – first place	2024 Oulo	Lady Open
IPSC Shotgun World Shoot
Gold medal – first place	2012 Debrecen	Lady Standard
Gold medal – first place	2015 Agna	Lady Standard
Gold medal – first place	2018 Châteauroux	Lady Standard
Gold medal – first place	2023 Pattaya	Lady Standard
IPSC PCC World Shoot
Silver medal – second place	2025 Znojmo	Lady PC Optics

Lena Miculek is an American professional competitive shooter, firearms educator, and product developer in the firearms industry.

Lena was born and raised on her family's shooting range in Princeton, Louisiana. She is the daughter of IPSC Revolver World Champion Jerry Miculek and Handgun Lady Open Champion Kay Clark Miculek. Her grandfather was the gunsmith Jim Clark of Clark Custom Guns, making her a third-generation firearms professional.

Miculek began shooting competitively when she was eight years old. In an interview when asked about her first competition, Miculek stated, "I was eight and my sister was 10. We were competing at the Sportsmans Team Challenge. We shot a Ruger 10/22 rifle and a Smith & Wesson Model 41 .22 pistol as a team. I earned a medal the size of my head for being their youngest competitor ever. The following year, they created a sub-junior category."

From 8 years old, Miculek continued to compete in various shooting disciplines and began to make a name for herself. Miculek earned her first world title in Debrecen, Hungary (2012) at the age of 17 (Shotgun World Shoot Lady Standard Gold Medal).

Miculek holds 9 world titles in 5 different shooting disciplines: Rifle Only, Shotgun Only, Pistol Caliber Carbine (PCC), Multigun (Pistol/Rifle/Shotgun all together), and the NRA World’s Greatest Shooter. These titles are among 3 PCC national titles, 20 PCC championships, over 50 3-Gun championships, and hundreds of championships and high lady titles in various disciplines. Miculek is a member of Team SIG’s professional competitive shooters (since January 2017). She is now “the top multi-discipline female competitor in the world and focuses on 3-Gun and PCC Competition as a member of Team SIG."

As Miculek spent most of her time on the road traveling from competition to competition, in 2021 she began to make modifications to her 2017 Toyota Tacoma so that she could journey on the road along with her beloved dog, Letty. As a single female on the road, Miculek quickly realized the need to explore ways of self-protection so that she could freely and safely enjoy her time traveling and adventuring. This led to her journey of concealed carry. She soon realized the many challenges to concealed carry that there are for women in finding the right products and resources to confidently and competently navigate the world of concealment. This gap in the firearms industry along with other personal experiences struck a chord in Miculek and eventually led to the development of what is now known as ROSE by SIG SAUER.

In partnership with SIG SAUER, Miculek launched ROSE in January 2023. While still remaining a professional competitive shooter and member of Team SIG, Miculek saw the lack of education and resources specifically for women in their concealed carry journey. ROSE by SIG Sauer is a product, educational resource, and community specifically geared towards women. As of October 6th 2025, Lena has left team Sig Sauer.

== See also ==
- Maria Gushchina, Russian sport shooter
- Ashley Rheuark, American sport shooter
