= Russian Federation of Practical Shooting =

- Российская Федерация Практической Стрельбы
- President: Michael J. Gushchin
- Parent organization: International Practical Shooting Confederation
- Website: ipsc.ru

The Russian Federation of Practical Shooting (Russian: Российская Федерация Практической Стрельбы (ФПСР), Federatsia Prakticheskoi Strelbi Rossii) is the association for practical shooting in Russia under the International Practical Shooting Confederation (IPSC).

In reaction to the 2022 Russian invasion of Ukraine, the IPSC cancelled all scheduled and future level 3 and above international competitions in Russia. The president of IPSC, Vitaly Kryuchin, is Russian.

== See also ==
- 2017 IPSC Rifle World Shoot in Russia
- Russian Handgun Championship
- Russian Rifle Championship
- Russian Shotgun Championship
