= IPSC Shotgun World Shoots =

Competitive shotgun match

Practical Shotgun
- Classification: ICS (IPSC Classification System)
- Sport: Practical shooting
- Founded: In the 1970s
- Motto: "Diligentia, Vis, Celeritas" (DVC), Latin for "precision, power, speed"
- No. of teams: National teams
- Country: Over 100
- Venue: Shooting ranges
- Confederation: African, Australasian, European and Pan-American Zones
- Most recent champion: (Brazil) Lucas Roth de Oliveira (2023)
- Qualification: Region dependent number of slots. Regional selection procedures.
- Level on pyramid: 5
- Domestic cup: National championships
- Related competitions: IPSC Handgun, Rifle and Action Air World Shoots
- Website: ipsc.org
- 2021 IPSC Shotgun World Shoot

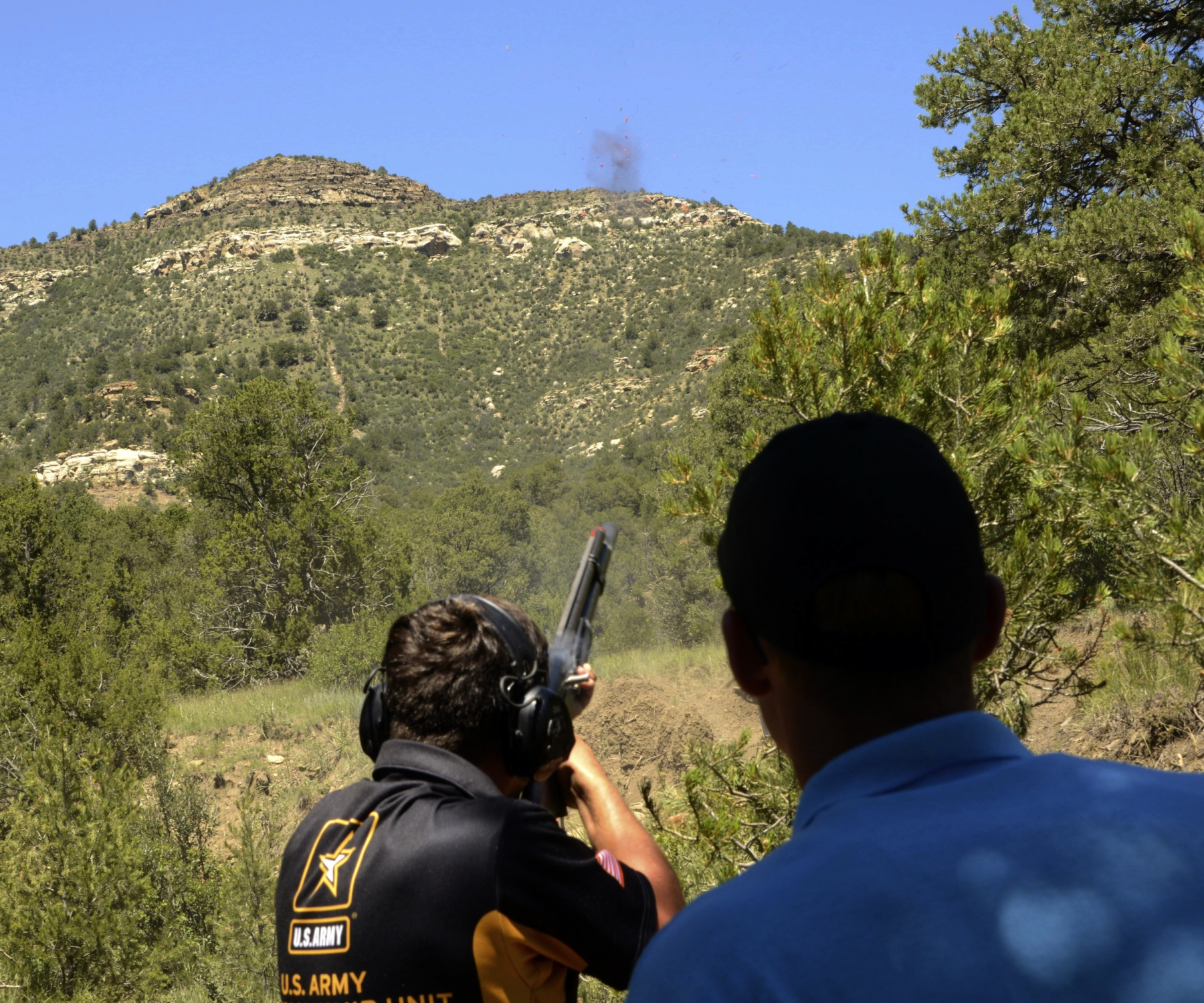
Daniel Horner firing his shotgun at a flying clay target during a match in South Carolina, U.S. in 2017

The IPSC Shotgun World Shoot is the highest level shotgun match within the International Practical Shooting Confederation (IPSC) and consists of several days and at least 30 separate courses of fire. The Shotgun World Shoots are held triennially on a rotational cycle with the other two main IPSC disciplines Handgun and Rifle.

== History ==
The first Shotgun World Shoot was held in 2012 in Debrecen, Hungary, and consisted of 30 stages over 5 days and over 400 competitors. The subsequent 2015 Shotgun World Shoot was held at the "Le Tre Piume" shooting range near Agna, Italy. The match had 30 stages over 5 days, and 635 competitors from 30 nations. The 2018 Shotgun World Shoot was held at the National Shooting Centre in Châteauroux, France and consisted of 30 stages over 7 days, and 656 competitors from 39 nations. The fourth Shotgun World Shoot has been awarded to Thailand, and was planned to be held in 2021, but moved to 2023 due to COVID-19. The next World Shoot is held in Corinth, Greece late September 2026.

=== List of Shotgun World Shoots ===
- 2012 Shotgun World Shoot in Debrecen, Hungary
- 2015 Shotgun World Shoot in Agna, Italy
- 2018 Shotgun World Shoot at the National Shooting Centre, Châteauroux, France
- 2023 Shotgun World Shoot in Pattaya, Thailand. Pushed to 2023 due to COVID.
- 2026 Shotgun World Shoot in Corinth, Greece

== Individual champions ==
The following is a list of previous and current Shotgun World Champions:

=== Overall Category ===
Year	Division	Gold	Silver	Bronze	Venue
2012	Open	(Slovakia) Ivan Hos	(Ukraine) Oleksandr Shymchenko	(Czech Republic) Josef Rakusan	World Shoot I
2012	Modified	(Serbia) Igor Jankovic	(Finland) Jani Lehtonen	(Serbia) Goran Jankovic	World Shoot I
2012	Standard	(Finland) Petri Henrik Ol Runtti	(Italy) Roberto Vezzoli	(Russia) Sergei Konov	World Shoot I
2012	Manual	(Finland) Hans Roger Karp	(Italy) Luigi Silvestroni	(Russia) Aleksandr Petukhov	World Shoot I
2015	Open	(Czech Republic) Vaclav Vinduska	(Russia) Roman Khalitov	(Germany) Dirk Frey	World Shoot II
2015	Modified	(Serbia) Nikola Mihajlovic	(Serbia) Igor Jankovic	(Finland) Mikael Kaislaranta	World Shoot II
2015	Standard	(Italy) Roberto Vezzoli	(Finland) Raine Peltokoski	(Finland) Teemu Rintala	World Shoot II
2015	Manual	(Finland) Kim Leppänen	(Finland) Jaakko Viitala	(Finland) Ari Matero	World Shoot II
2018	Open	(United States) Josh Froelich	(Czech Republic) Vaclav Vinduska	(Russia) Vladimir Kharitonov	World Shoot III
2018	Modified	(Finland) Teemu Rintala	(Finland) Sami Hautamäki	(Italy) Roberto Vezzoli	World Shoot III
2018	Standard	(Finland) Jarkko Laukia	(Finland) Kim Leppänen	(United Kingdom) Joshua Kenny	World Shoot III
2018	Manual	(Finland) Jaakko Viitala	(Russia) Pavel Orlov	(Russia) Yury Nikolaev	World Shoot III
2023	Manual	(Finland) Jaakko Viitala	(Thailand) Siriwut Dechsuwan	(Thailand) Pansa Ketkaeo	World Shoot IV
2023	Standard	(Brazil) Lucas Roth de Oliveira	(Finland) Jani Kössi	(United Kingdom) Joshua Kenny	World Shoot IV
2023	Open	(United States) Scott Greene	(Poland) Marcin Tausiewicz	(Turkey) Vladimir Subbotin	World Shoot IV
2023	Modified	(Finland) Raine Peltokoski	(Finland) Sami Hautamäki	(Greece) Michail Chatzigiannis	World Shoot IV

=== Lady Category ===
Year	Division	Gold	Silver	Bronze	Venue
2012	Open	(Thailand) Malin Suebsuk	(Sweden) Elsa Marianne Hansen	(Greece) Efstathia Chasogia	World Shoot I
2012	Standard	(United States) Lena Miculek	(Germany) Sandra Schuh	(United Kingdom) Vanessa Duffy	World Shoot I
2015	Open	(Russia) Alena Karelina	(Italy) Irene Canetta	(Russia) Natalia Rumyantseva	World Shoot II
2015	Standard	(United States) Lena Miculek-Afentul	(United States) Dianna Muller	(Germany) Sandra Schuh	World Shoot II
2018	Open	(Russia) Alena Karelina	(Italy) Irene Canetta	(Russia) Maria Shvarts	World Shoot III
2018	Modified	(France) Margaux Nycz	(Philippines) Janice Navato	(Thailand) Chanyanuch Parkyam	World Shoot III
2018	Standard	(United States) Lena Miculek	(United States) Dianna Muller	(United States) Dakota Overland	World Shoot III
2018	Manual	(Italy) Alessandra Moro	(Australia) Arnya Olsen	(Brazil) Cândida Tatian Balestiere Vargas	World Shoot III
2023	Manual	(Spain) Airi Rodríguez Domènech	(Brazil) Luisa Acosta	(Germany) Elena Ott	World Shoot IV
2023	Standard	(United States) Lena Miculek	(Ukraine) Oleksandra Iliukhina	(United States) Jalise Williams	World Shoot IV
2023	Open	(United States) Lanny Barnes Siggins	(Thailand) Parisa Phatthanatechadet	(Kazakhstan) Natalya Mestoyeva	World Shoot IV
2023	Modified	(Thailand) Thanawadee Perkyam	(Thailand) Patcharin Innhom	(Thailand) Pleum Ratchataputthiporn	World Shoot IV

=== Lady Senior Category ===
Year	Division	Gold	Silver	Bronze	Venue
2023	Standard	(South Africa) Jane Van Wyk	(Thailand) Pacharin Ronsirichairattana	(Germany) Marion Stuber	World Shoot IV

=== Junior Category ===
Year	Division	Gold	Silver	Bronze	Venue
2012	Standard	(Thailand) Aphisit Kaewmuangpet	(Switzerland) Timon Blattner	(United Kingdom) Evangelos Gravanis	World Shoot I
2015	Standard	(United Kingdom) Joshua Kenny	(United States) Nathan Staskiewicz	(United States) Timothy Yackley	World Shoot II
2018	Standard	(United States) Garrett Dietrich	(Brazil) Lucas Roth	(United States) Nicholas Realuyo	World Shoot III
2023	Standard	(United Kingdom) Robert Ramsay	(Sweden) Miranda Bjurshagen	(Thailand) Rattapong Khanongkhae	World Shoot IV
2023	Open	(United States) Varick Beise	(Thailand) V.kannavet Poukpumi	(United States) Nathaniel Schmidt	World Shoot IV

=== Senior Category ===
Year	Division	Gold	Silver	Bronze	Venue
2012	Open	(United States) Jerry Miculek	(Italy) Mario Riillo	(Russia) Ramazan Mubarakov	World Shoot I
2012	Modified	(Serbia) Branislav Raketic	(Italy) Enri Botturi	(Italy) Amedeo Sessa	World Shoot I
2012	Standard	(United States) Kurt Miller	(United States) Jeffrey Cramblit	(Germany) Klaus Möller	World Shoot I
2012	Manual	(Poland) Boguslaw Gaweda	(Finland) Jukka Matti Mikkola	(Czech Republic) Lumir Safranek	World Shoot I
2015	Open	(Sweden) Stefan Ekstedt	(Italy) Luciano Todisco	(Sweden) Johan Hansen	World Shoot II
2015	Modified	(Finland) Mikael Kaislaranta	(Italy) Roberto Galgani	(Serbia) Branislav Raketic	World Shoot II
2015	Standard	(Germany) Klaus Moeller	(United States) Kurt Miller	(Germany) Jochen Tuerk	World Shoot II
2015	Manual	(Italy) Davide Bellini	(Netherlands) Adrie De Bot	(Brazil) Luiz Backes	World Shoot II
2018	Open	(Sweden) Johan Hansen	(United States) Jojo Vidanes	(Italy) Luciano Todisco	World Shoot III
2018	Modified	(Finland) Mikael Kaislaranta	(Serbia) Branislav Raketic	(Italy) Eduardo Roberto Buticchi	World Shoot III
2018	Standard	(Finland) Mika Riste	(Ukraine) Ihor Zahurnyi	(Philippines) Raul Jr Tolentino	World Shoot III
2018	Manual	(Italy) Davide Bellini	(Italy) Luigi Silvestroni	(United Kingdom) Iain Guy	World Shoot III
2023	Manual	(Italy) Pierfrancesco Pasini	(Poland) Łukasz Borkowski	(Philippines) Joselito Placides	World Shoot IV
2023	Standard	(Finland) Jarkko Laukia	(Thailand) Pairat Jiammuangpak	(Finland) Mika Riste	World Shoot IV
2023	Open	(Czech Republic) Václav Vinduška	(Poland) Piotr Niewiadomski	(Italy) Dario Forlani	World Shoot IV
2023	Modified	(Finland) Raine Peltokoski	(Finland) Sami Hautamäki	(Greece) Ioannis Topalidis	World Shoot IV

=== Super Senior Category ===
Year	Division	Gold	Silver	Bronze	Venue
2012	Open	(Italy) Furio Liberti	(South Africa) Carlo Belletti	(United Kingdom) Michael John Scarlett	World Shoot I
2015	Open	(Italy) Amedeo Sessa	(South Africa) Carlo Belletti	(Italy) Massimo Corazzini	World Shoot II
2015	Standard	(Italy) Gavino Mura	(Argentina) Roberto Maritato	(Italy) Sergio Fontanelli	World Shoot II
2015	Manual	(Czech Republic) Lumir Safranek	(Germany) Lothar Ring	(Italy) Massimo Grassi	World Shoot II
2018	Open	(Italy) Giovanni Liberti	(Greece) Apostolos Bechtsoudis	(Germany) Michael Lautenschlager	World Shoot III
2018	Standard	(Canada) Karl Blum	(Germany) Bernd Wiessner	(Italy) Amedeo Sessa	World Shoot III
2018	Manual	(Finland) Matti Mikkola	(Germany) Lothar Ring	(Thailand) Thanapol Kuichairatana	World Shoot III
2023	Manual	(Italy) Davide Bellini	(South Africa) Kieyaam Klein	(Belgium) Pierre Brochard	World Shoot IV
2023	Standard	(United Kingdom) Nicolaas Du Plessis	(United Kingdom) Michael Siva-Jothy	(Italy) Danilo Mainardi	World Shoot IV
2023	Open	(Italy) Fabio Teodori	(Thailand) Vorapol Kulchairattana	(Thailand) Suthep Taithongchai	World Shoot IV
2023	Modified	(Philippines) Doroteo Palines	(Thailand) Thitivachra Thanupongvarich	(Thailand) Thanayot Changthong	World Shoot IV

=== Grand Senior Category ===
Year	Division	Gold	Silver	Bronze	Venue
2023	Open	(South Africa) Joel Neville Cohen	(South Africa) Irving Robert Stevenson	(South Africa) Carlo Belletti	World Shoot IV

== See also ==
- IPSC Handgun World Shoots
- IPSC Rifle World Shoots
- IPSC Action Air World Shoots
- List of world sports championships
