= IPSC Russian Handgun Championship =

The IPSC Russian Handgun Championship is an IPSC (IPSC) level 3 championship held once a year by the Russian Federation of Practical Shooting. In reaction to the 2022 Russian invasion of Ukraine, the IPSC cancelled all scheduled and future level 3 and above international competitions in Russia.

== Champions ==
The following is a list of current and previous champions.

=== Overall category ===
Year	Division	Gold	Silver	Bronze	Venue
2003	Production	(Russia) Vitaly Kryuchin	(Russia) Nikolay Onshin	(Russia) Mikhail Gushin	
2004	Open	(Russia) Vitaly Kryuchin	(Russia) Mikhail Guschin	(Russia) Alexander Gavrilyuk	
2004	Production	(Russia) Vasiliy Kalagin	(Russia) Alexey Ragozin	(Russia) Alexey Kuzenkov	
2005	Open	(Russia) Nickolai Onshin	(Russia) Mikhael Nemikin	(Russia) Mikhael Gushin	
2005	Standard	(Russia) Ivan Godov	(Russia) Vasily Kalagin	(Russia) Sergey Pushkov	
2007	Modified	(Russia) Nikolay Onshin	(Russia) Kirill V. Avdeev	(Russia) Denis Kapturenko	
2007	Standard	(Russia) Evgeny B. Efimov	(Russia) Jevgeni Chizhikov	(Russia) Vjatseslav Volutsa	
2007	Production	(Russia) Andrei Volskii	(Russia) Aleksandr Gavriljuk	(Russia) Mihail U. Guschin	
2010	Standard	(Russia) Aleksey Pitchugin	(Russia) Vesa Kaunisto	(Russia) Sergey Lipatov	
2010	Production	(Russia) Aleksey Ragozin	(Russia) Nikolay Onshin	(Russia) Vladimir Titov	
2011	Open	(Russia) Alexey Ragozin	(Russia) Vladimir Titov	(Russia) Sergey Lipatov	
2011	Standard	(Russia) Nickolay Onshin	(Russia) Alexander Betin	(Russia) Nikolay Zryachev	
2011	Production	(Russia) Ljubisa Momcilovic	(Russia) Alexey Pichugin	(Russia) Egor Khramov	
2012	Open	(Russia) Vladimir Titov	(Russia) Victor Boyarkin	(Russia) Daniil Karchev	
2012	Standard	(Russia) Nickolay Onshin	(Russia) Kirill Kiselev	(Russia) Sergey Lipatov	
2012	Production	(Russia) Alexey Pichugin	(Russia) Pavel Torgashov	(Russia) Vesa Kaunisto	
2013	Open	(Russia) Sergey Rudov	(Russia) Daniil Karchev	(Russia) Dmitriy Ostrovskiy	
2013	Standard	(Russia) Nikolay Onshin	(Russia) Vladimir Titov	(Russia) Kirill Kiselev	
2013	Production	(Russia) Pavel Torgashov	(Russia) Maria Gushchina	(Russia) Aleksey Pichugin	
2014	Open	(Russia) Viktor A. Boyarkin	(Russia) Daniil O. Karchev	(Russia) Sergey Y. Rudov	
2014	Standard	(Russia) Evgeniy V. Potapenko	(Russia) Nikolay V. Onshin	(Russia) Ilya N. Gubin	
2014	Classic	(Russia) Sergey B. Andreev	(Russia) Aleksey A. Bogatyrev	(Russia) Andrey Y. Denishchuk	
2014	Production	(Russia) Pavel A. Torgashov	(Russia) Maria Gushchina	(Russia) Aleksey V. Pichugin	
2015	Open	(Russia) Viktor A. Boyarkin	(Russia) Roman Khalitov	(Russia) Daniil O. Karchev	
2015	Standard	(Russia) Nikolay V. Onshin	(Russia) Vladimir G. Titov	(Russia) Ilya N. Gubin	
2015	Classic	(Russia) Aleksey V. Ragozin	(Russia) Aleksey A. Bogatyrev	(Russia) Dmitriy V. Ashikhmin	
2015	Production	(Russia) Aleksey V. Pichugin	(Russia) Pavel A. Torgashov	(Russia) Maria Gushchina	

=== Lady category ===
Year	Division	Gold	Silver	Bronze	Venue
2003	Production	(Russia) Zoya Shatokhin	(Russia) Anna Samsakov	(Russia) Natalia Kalianova	
2004	Open	(Russia) Anna Samsakova	(Russia) Natalia Kalianova	(Russia) Elizaveta Rubert	
2007	Modified	(Russia) Irina Grishaeva	(Russia) Margarita Minaeva	(Russia) Larisa I Gorelikova	
2010	Standard	(Russia) Maria Gushchina	(Russia) Mira Barinova	(Russia) Elizaveta Shushpanova	
2010	Production	(Russia) Anastasia Chernenko	(Russia) Anna Mishelov	(Russia) Tatiana Panova	
2011	Standard	(Russia) Yuliya Strumentova	(Russia) Margarita Minaeva	(Russia) Elena Knyazeva	
2011	Production	(Russia) Maria Gushchina	(Russia) Mira Barinova	(Russia) Anastasiya Chernenko	
2012	Standard	(Russia) Yuliya Strumentova	(Russia) Ekaterina Gordienko	(Russia) Vera Vasiljeva	
2012	Production	(Russia) Maria Gushchina	(Russia) Svetlana Nikolaeva	(Russia) Mira Barinova	
2013	Standard	(Russia) Mira Barinova	(Russia) Yuliya Strumentova	(Russia) Tatyana Makarova	
2013	Production	(Russia) Maria Gushchina	(Russia) Anastasiya Chernenko	(Russia) Zoya Petrushina	
2014	Standard	(Russia) Anastasiya V. Chernenko	(Russia) Vera G. Vasileva	(Russia) Tatyana G. Makarova	
2014	Production	(Russia) Maria Gushchina	(Russia) Inna V. Deledivka	(Russia) Ekaterina V. Tabachenko	
2015	Standard	(Russia) Anastasiya V. Chernenko	(Russia) Tatyana G. Makarova	(Russia) Yuliya N. Strumentova	
2015	Production	(Russia) Maria Gushchina	(Russia) Ekaterina D. Gordienko	(Russia) Ekaterina V. Tabachenko	

=== Junior category ===
Year	Division	Gold	Silver	Bronze	Venue
2011	Production	(Russia) Pavel Torgashov	(Russia) Alexander Lunin	(Russia) Leonid Zgonnikov	
2013	Production	(Russia) Nikita Kryuchin	(Russia) Konstantin Kryuchin	(Russia) Aleksandr Lunin	
2014	Standard	(Russia) Aleksandr S. Rudov	(Russia) Aleksey V. Ashikhmin	(Russia) Ekaterina D. Gordienko	
2014	Production	(Russia) Pavel A. Torgashov	(Russia) Aleksandr A. Lunin	(Russia) Aleksandr P. Novikov	
2015	Standard	(Russia) Aleksandr S. Rudov	(Russia) Danila I. Pakhomov	(Russia) Ilya A. Sologub	

=== Senior category ===
Year	Division	Gold	Silver	Bronze	Venue
2011	Open	(Russia) Vadim Stephanyuk	(Russia) Albert Garaev	(Russia) Venegdit Efimov	
2011	Production	(Russia) Vasiliy Kurbatskikh	(Russia) Oleg Medvednikov	(Russia) Andrey Myasnikov	
2012	Standard	(Russia) Evgeny Efimov	(Russia) Aleksey Rudenko	(Russia) Alexey Serdyukov	
2012	Production	(Russia) Vasiliy Kurbatskikh	(Russia) Oleg Medvednikov	(Russia) Andrey Myasnikov	
2013	Standard	(Russia) Aleksey Serdyukov	(Russia) Evgeniy Efimov	(Russia) Aleksey Rudenko	
2013	Production	(Russia) Vasiliy Kurbatskikh	(Russia) Aleksandr Markov	(Russia) Anatoliy Kondrukh	
2014	Open	(Russia) Aleksandr P. Samonyuk	(Russia) Sergey A. Shutov	(Russia) Aleksandr B. Ermizin	
2014	Standard	(Russia) Aleksandr F. Polegeshko	(Russia) Aleksey V. Serdyukov	(Russia) Anatoliy I. Kondrukh	
2014	Production	(Russia) Aleksandr G. Markov	(Russia) Vasiliy A. Kurbatskikh	(Russia) Oleg V. Medvednikov	
2015	Standard	(Russia) Ilya N. Gubin	(Russia) Evgeniy B. Petrushin	(Russia) Evgeniy B. Efimov	
2015	Production	(Russia) Aleksandr G. Markov	(Russia) Aleksandr D. Sanzharevskiy	(Russia) Oleg V. Medvednikov	

== See also ==
- Russian Rifle Championship
- Russian Shotgun Championship
