= 2018 IPSC Action Air World Shoot =

International sport shooting competition

2018 IPSC Action Air World Shoot at the
- Venue: Kowloonbay International Trade & Exhibition Centre (KITEC)
- Location: Hong Kong
- Dates: Opening Ceremony: 29 June; Main Match: 30 June - 2 July 2018; Closing Ceremony: 3 July
- Competitors: 481 from 18 nations
- Winning time: 2322.4491 of 2580 points

Medalists
gold medal	Standard (Largest Division) (Hong Kong) Warout Lau
silver medal	(Hong Kong) Yin Tai Yenty Lee
bronze medal	(Hong Kong) Pak Lam Lai

The 2018 IPSC Action Air World Shoot I was the first IPSC Action Air World Shoot, and was held in Hong Kong indoor at the Kowloonbay International Trade & Exhibition Centre (KITEC). The match consisted of 30 stages over 3 days and had a match capacity of 600 competitors.

== Champions ==
=== Open ===
The Open division had the second largest match participation with 175 out of 481 starting competitors (36.4 %).

Individual

Overall	Competitor	Points	Overall Match Percent	
Gold	(Hong Kong) Chun Ki Wu	2380.7194	100.00 %	
Silver	(Macau) Chi Man Sio	2352.8055	98.83 %	
Bronze	(Hong Kong) Chun Sing Yau	2337.7164	98.19 %	
4th	(Hong Kong) Yiu Fung Lau	2326.5045	97.72 %	
5th	(Hong Kong) Ping Kei Leung	2277.7195	95.67 %	
6th	(Macau) Ka Kit Wong	2230.0000	93.67 %	
7th	(Hong Kong) Cheuk Lun Kwan	2183.9028	91.73 %	
8th	(Hong Kong) Kin Wai Chan	2174.8743	91.35 %	
9th	(Hong Kong) Sze Ko Ho	2169.4877	91.13 %	
10th	(Hong Kong) Kwun Wan Lewis Kwok	2161.8313	90.81 %	
Lady	Competitor	Points	Overall percent	Category percent
1st	(Hong Kong) Wing Tam	1991.9258	83.67 %	100.00 %
2nd	(Hong Kong) Yuen Ting Loo	1902.1274	79.90 %	95.49 %
3rd	(Hong Kong) Yuen Chong Lau	1785.8839	75.01 %	89.66 %
Junior	Competitor	Points	Overall percent	Category percent
1st	(Hong Kong) Sze Yuen Lee	1876.5304	78.82 %	100.00 %
2nd	(Spain) Francisco Javie Honrubia Ruiz	1682.3645	70.67 %	89.65 %
3rd	(Philippines) Jerico Navarro	1459.8891	61.32 %	77.80 %
Senior	Competitor	Points	Overall percent	Category percent
1st	(Hong Kong) Kwok Fai Lo	1991.7825	83.66 %	100.00 %
2nd	(Hong Kong) Wai Leung Woo	1991.5879	83.65 %	99.99 %
3rd	(Hong Kong) Chi Wai Lau	1784.3127	74.95 %	89.58 %
Super Senior	Competitor	Points	Overall percent	Category percent
1st	(Hong Kong) Ping Shing Wong	1602.2898	67.30 %	100.00 %
2nd	(Hong Kong) Kwong Sang Lai	1498.5873	62.95 %	93.53 %
3rd	(Hong Kong) Man Tsang	1365.8397	57.37 %	85.24 %

Teams Open

Overall	Country	Points	Percent	Team members
Gold	Hong Kong	7044.9403	100.00 %	Chun Ki Wu, Chun Sing Yau, Yiu Fung Lau, Sze Ko Ho
Silver	Macau	6667.6888	94.65 %	Chi Man Sio, Ka Kit Wong, Ka Seng Leong, Brian Cheung
Bronze	Chinese Taipei	5839.3687	82.89 %	Kai M Chang, Wei Hua Peng, Chen Su Chiu, Ho Chien Tsai

=== Standard ===
The Standard division had the largest match participation with 213 out of 481 starting competitors (44.3 %).

Individual

Overall	Competitor	Points	Overall Match Percent	
Gold	(Hong Kong) Warout Lau	2322.4491	100.00 %	
Silver	(Hong Kong) Yin Tai Yenty Lee	2319.7542	99.88 %	
Bronze	(Hong Kong) Pak Lam Lai	2296.3596	98.88 %	
4th	(Hong Kong) Chun Hei Chin	2219.6709	95.57 %	
5th	(Hong Kong) Tsz Wai Li	2197.6538	94.63 %	
6th	(Hong Kong) Wing Kin Ricky Ip	2182.0569	93.95 %	
7th	(Macau) Ka Chon Mok	2164.3104	93.19 %	
8th	(Hong Kong) Ka Kiu Wong	2058.2442	88.62 %	
9th	(Hong Kong) Ho Kee Chan	2056.7449	88.56 %	
10th	(Hong Kong) Man Lok Li	2035.7228	87.65 %	
Junior	Competitor	Points	Overall percent	Category percent
1st	(Hong Kong) Tsz Him Wong	1963.0885	84.53 %	100.00 %
2nd	(United Kingdom) Paul Wyborn	1933.0809	83.23 %	98.47 %
3rd	(Russia) Alexsandr Tarasov	1895.2585	81.61 %	96.54 %
Lady	Competitor	Points	Overall percent	Category percent
1st	(Macau) Lei Kei Fong	1943.6130	83.69 %	100.00 %
2nd	(Hong Kong) Ka Yee Wong	1927.1310	82.98 %	99.15 %
3rd	(Hong Kong) Sin Yee Cindy Wan	1759.5113	75.76 %	90.53 %
Senior	Competitor	Points	Overall percent	Category percent
1st	(Hong Kong) Ka Ming Leung	1904.2835	81.99 %	100.00 %
2nd	(Hong Kong) Ping Ki Norman Hung	1841.0473	79.27 %	96.68 %
3rd	(Hong Kong) Nai Yee Tom Tam	1769.4122	76.19 %	92.92 %

Teams Standard

Overall	Country	Points	Percent	Team members
Gold	Hong Kong	6938.5629	100.00 %	Warout Lau, Yin Tai Yenty Lee, Pak Lam Lai, Tsz Wai Li
Silver	Macau	6051.3914	87.21 %	Ka Chon Mok, Lok Man Cheung, Weng Hong Lei, Cheok Hou Ho
Bronze	Chinese Taipei	5525.7457	79.64 %	Yin Chen Chou, Jih Hui Lo, Pei Chen Ke, Yi Fan Nie
Junior	Country	Points	Percent	Team members
Gold	Hong Kong	5364.0584	100.00 %	Tsz Him Wong, Chi Hang Ko, Chun Him Tse, Ohymn Yam
Silver	Russia	5096.2585	95.01 %	Alexsandr Tarasov, Vadim Evdokimov, Daniil Sharafanenko, Maksim Kotliar
Bronze	Bulgaria	2405.3984	44.84 %	Anthony Maneva, Alipi Alipiev, Alexander Boev

=== Production ===
The Production division had the third largest match participation with 60 out of 481 starting competitors (12.5 %).

Individual

Overall	Competitor	Points	Overall Match Percent	
Gold	(Hong Kong) Yik Man Chan	2383.0682	100.00 %	
Silver	(Hong Kong) Chak Sang Li	2338.3300	98.12 %	
Bronze	(Chinese Taipei) Teng Hsiung Chan	2150.4591	90.24 %	
4th	(Hong Kong) Chun Keung Ng	2135.7714	89.62 %	
5th	(Hong Kong) Kwan Kit Leung	2099.1468	88.09 %	
6th	(Hong Kong) Ho Wan Benny Ching	2060.9499	86.48 %	
7th	(Hong Kong) Ka Kit Ho	2016.8503	84.63 %	
8th	(Chinese Taipei) Yu Chen Lai	1986.8367	83.37 %	
9th	(Russia) Evgeniy Potapenko	1966.9950	82.54 %	
10th	(Chinese Taipei) Cheng Jia Hua	1881.8596	78.97 %	
Lady	Competitor	Points	Overall percent	Category percent
1st	(Hong Kong) Ying Tung Lau	1690.0350	70.92 %	100.00 %
2nd	(Hong Kong) Ka Yan Mok	1569.1499	65.85 %	92.85 %
3rd	(Hong Kong) Ling Kiu Ku	1460.5073	61.29 %	86.42 %
Junior	Competitor	Points	Overall percent	Category percent
1st	(Russia) Kirill Semenov	1609.5311	67.54 %	100.00 %
2nd	(Russia) Mikhail Dorofeev	1495.5188	62.76 %	92.92 %
3rd	(Russia) Ekaterina Iakimova	1408.2771	59.10 %	87.50 %
Senior	Competitor	Points	Overall percent	Category percent
1st	(Hong Kong) Wai Fung Lee	1133.5945	47.57 %	100.00 %
2nd	(Hong Kong) Chun Hung Li	1014.3784	42.57 %	89.48 %
3rd	(Papua New Guinea) Alfred Reu	447.8936	18.79 %	39.51 %

Teams Production

Overall	Country	Points	Percent	Team members
Gold	Hong Kong	6857.1696	100.00 %	Yik Man Chan, Chak Sang Li, Chun Keung Ng, Kwan Kit Leung
Silver	Chinese Taipei	6019.1554	87.78 %	Teng Hsiung Chan, Yu Chen Lai, Jia Hua Cheng, Shu Lai
Bronze	Russia	5393.8400	78.66 %	Evgeniy Potapenko, Andrei Neshei, Mikhail Babayan

=== Classic ===
The Classic division had the fourth largest match participation with 33 out of 481 starting competitors (7 %).

Individual

Overall	Competitor	Points	Overall Match Percent	
Gold	(Hong Kong) Ka Chun Kenny Chan	2420.4094	100.00%	
Silver	(Hong Kong) Chun Hin Justin Chan	2396.3853	99.01 %	
Bronze	(Hong Kong) Kwok Wai Ringo Ng	2095.4611	86.57 %	
4th	(Hong Kong) Lai Hong Samson Chan	2074.6412	85.71 %	
5th	(Hong Kong) Chun Wai Ben Kung	2012.9036	83.16 %	
6th	(China) Man Kai Chris Ng	1993.5780	82.37 %	
7th	(Poland) Rafal Tomanek	1926.8870	79.61 %	
8th	(Hong Kong) Yu Ping Li	1917.8151	79.24 %	
9th	(China) Chiu Chun Loo	1820.8717	75.23 %	
10th	(Hong Kong) Kwok Kit Wong	1820.3167	75.21 %	
Junior	Competitor	Points	Overall percent	Category percent
1st	(Philippines) Allen Paul Marcos	1682.0144	69.49 %	100.00 %
2nd	(Russia) Maksim Shmelev	1365.5790	56.42 %	81.19 %
3rd	(Russia) Alena Fedorova	1305.2040	53.92 %	77.60 %
Senior	Competitor	Points	Overall percent	Category percent
1st	(Macau) Io On Au	1658.6140	68.53 %	100.00 %
2nd	(Macau) Hui Wo Leung	1651.8863	68.25 %	99.59 %
3rd	(Macau) Chi Keong Chang	1496.6827	61.84 %	90.24 %

Teams Classic

Overall	Country	Points	Percent	Team members
Gold	Hong Kong	6912.2558	100.00 %	Ka Chun Kenny Chan, Chun Hin Justin Chan, Kwok Wai Ringo Ng, Lai Hong Samson Chan
Silver	China	5483.3419	79.33 %	Man Kai Chris Ng, Chiu Chun Loo, William Sien, Siu Cheung Fuk
Bronze	Philippines	4817.1712	69.69 %	Clyde Santos, Allen Paul Marcos, Jonathan Medrano

== See also ==
- IPSC Action Air World Shoot
- IPSC Handgun World Shoots
- IPSC Rifle World Shoots
- IPSC Shotgun World Shoot
