= IPSC Far East Asia Handgun Championship =

International shooting competition

The IPSC Far East Asia Handgun Championship is an IPSC level 4 championship hosted every third year in East Asia (Far East Asia).

== History ==
- 2013 Thailand
- 2015 Malaysia
- 2018 Thailand
- 2021 Laos

== See also ==
- IPSC Australasia Handgun Championship
