= Tim Yackley =

American sport shooter (born 1998)

Timothy Yackley
Personal information
- Born: July 1998 (age 28) Virginia
- Occupation: Competitive Shooter
Medal record
IPSC
Representing United States
IPSC Shotgun World Shoot
| Bronze medal – third place | 2015 Agna | Standard Junior |
| Silver medal – second place | 2018 Châteauroux | Standard Team |

Tim Yackley (born 1998) is an American sport shooter who won the 2018 NRA World Shooting Championship, becoming the youngest person to ever win the event. He took bronze in the Standard division Junior category at the 2015 IPSC Shotgun World Shoot in Italy. At the 2017 IPSC Rifle World Shoot he placed 10th overall in the Open division. In June 2018, Yackley competed at the 2018 IPSC Shotgun World Shoot in France, finishing seventh overall in standard and helping Team USA win a team silver medal. Tim was also the Bianchi Cup Junior National Champion for 4 years in a row (2015-2018) and the NRA Action Pistol Junior World Champion in 2018.

He is a versatile shooter and has competed in IPSC, USPSA, multigun, NRA Action Pistol and Palma long range rifle shooting. His practical shooting career started when he attended a USPSA junior camp in 2011 and the next summer attended the 2012 MGM Junior Camp. In the 2012 fall he started competing actively in 3-gun. Tim travels the country with his entire family, also known as The Yackley 5 (Mark, Becky, Tim, Sean, and Andrew), all 5 of whom actively compete in a variety of shooting competitions.
