= Vitaly Kryuchin =

Russian sport shooter

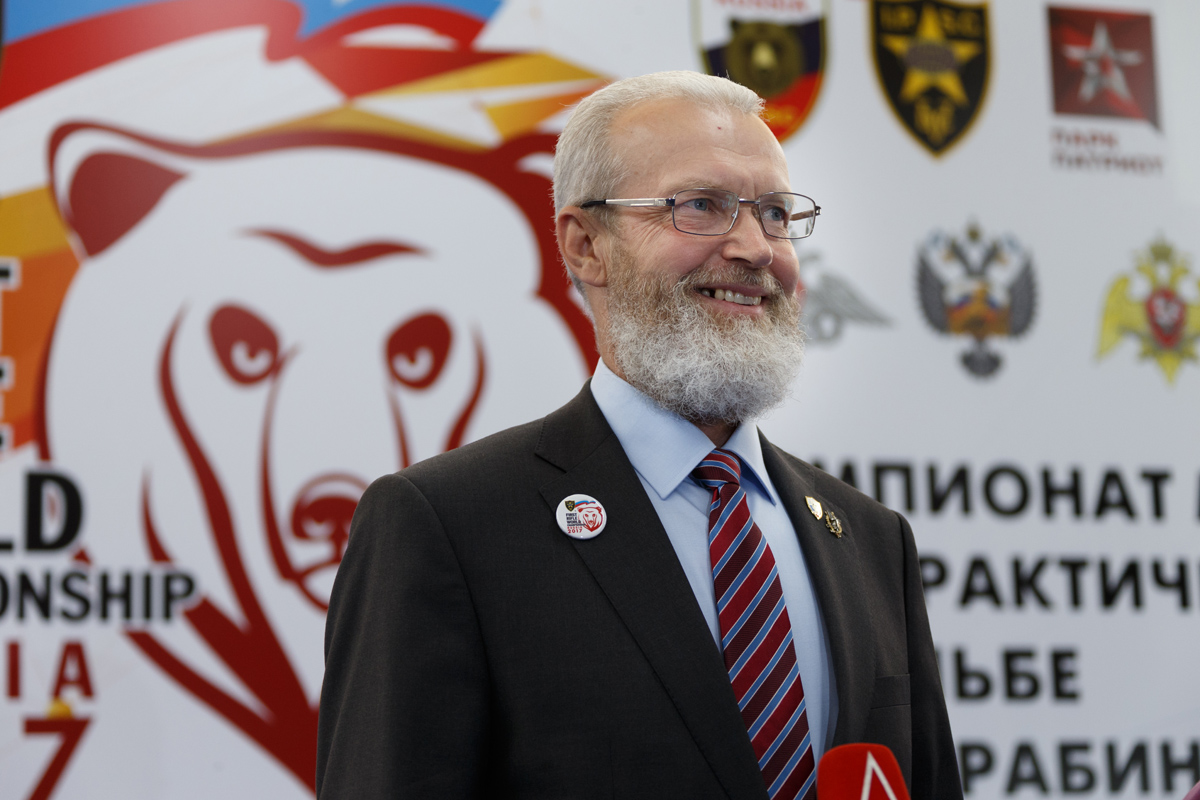
- Vitaly Kryuchin at the 2017 IPSC Rifle World Shoot

Personal information
- Born: 26. July 1963 (age 62)
Medal record
IPSC
Representing Russia
IPSC European Handgun Championship
Bronze medal – third place	2007	Production
IPSC Russian Handgun Championship
Gold medal – first place	2003	Production
Gold medal – first place	2004	Open
IPSC European Shotgun Championship
Bronze medal – third place	2003	Modified
Gold medal – first place	2006	Modified
IPSC Russian Shotgun Championship
Gold medal – first place	2003	Open
Gold medal – first place	2004	Open

Vitaly Kryuchin is a Russian sport shooter and president of the International Practical Shooting Confederation and Russian Federation of Practical Shooting. He has one gold and bronze medal from the IPSC European Shotgun Championship (2003 and 2006) and one gold medal from the IPSC European Handgun Championship (2007).

Beside competition shooting, Kryuchin is known for his point shooting skills. A video went viral in September 2016 where he teamed up with an orchestra of two singers, a violinist and a keyboardist, and played the Ode To Joy by Beethoven, Old MacDonald Had a Farm and a traditional Russian tune by shooting at pitched steel plates.
