= Josh Froelich =

American sport shooter

Personal information
- Nationality: American
- Occupation(s): IPSC shooter, businessman

Sport
- Team: Team JP Enterprises
Medal record
IPSC
Representing United States
IPSC Shotgun World Shoot
Gold medal – first place	2018 Châteauroux	Open

Josh Froelich is an American competition shooter who took gold at the 2018 IPSC Shotgun World Shoot in the Open division. Much of his competition shooting has been focused on multigun (3-Gun) and Pistol Caliber Carbine (PCC). He is also a former professional MMA fighter.

== See also ==
- Kim Leppänen, Finnish sport shooter
- Roberto Vezzoli, Italian sport shooter
