= IPSC Action Air =

Airsoft shooting sport

Action Air is an airsoft shooting sport based on practical shooting under the International Practical Shooting Confederation. The sport enjoys popularity in countries and areas such as Taiwan, Hong Kong, Macau, South Korea, and Japan, where civilian ownership of real firearms are either illegal or extremely difficult to obtain, but it is also used by some owners of real firearms as an affordable and easily available training tool. Action air is restricted to handgun, and is not included in the IPSC Tournament structure.

== History ==
Action Air was adopted by IPSC in 2008 at the General Assembly following the IPSC Handgun World Shoot XV in Bali, Indonesia, and the first approved rule book came in 2009. Up until then, the sport had already been exercised in Japan, Hong Kong, Macau and Taiwan for more than ten years.

== Targets ==
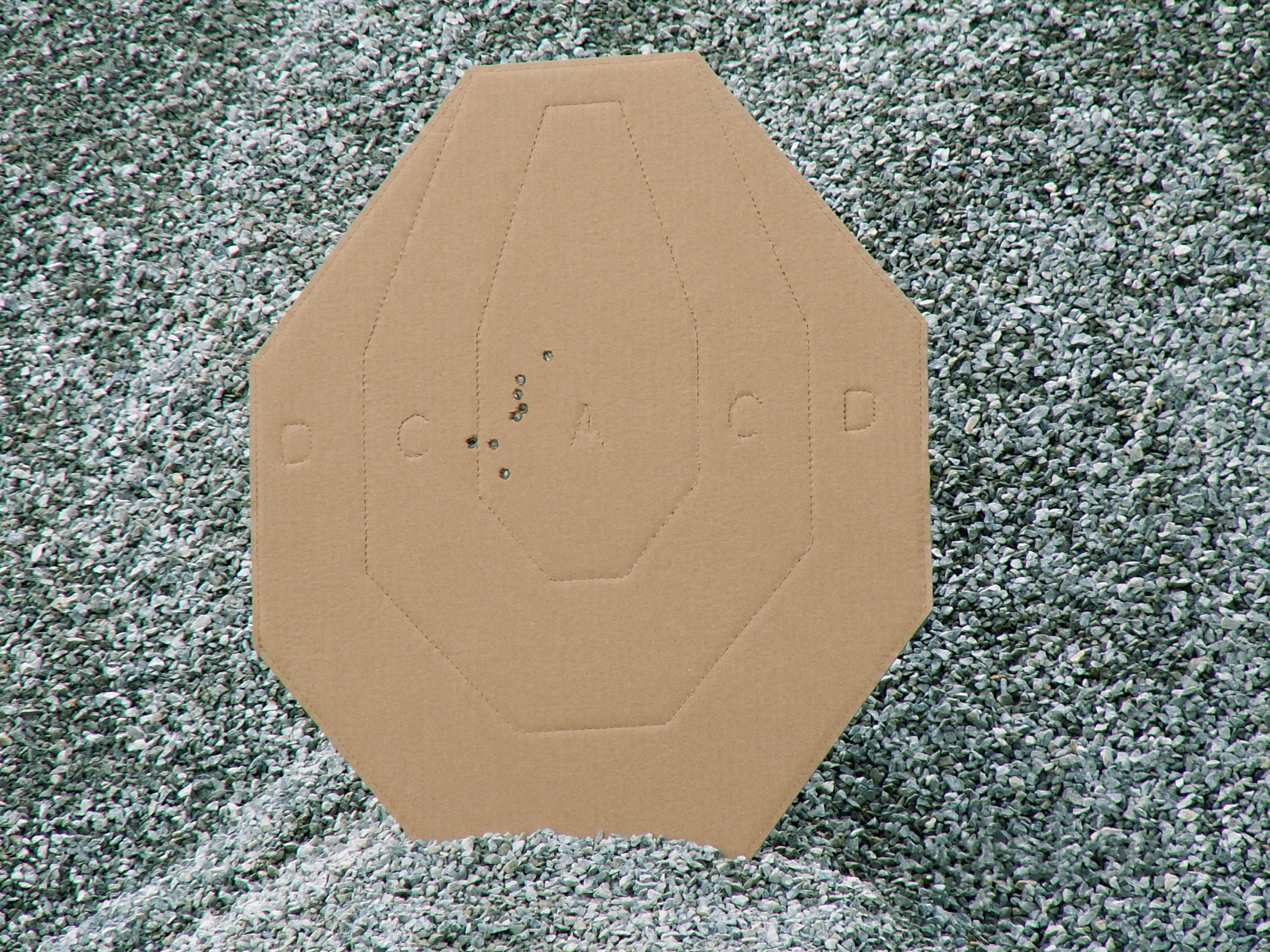
A scaled down version of the IPSC Target is used.

The ranges, paper targets and poppers are scaled down to suit airsoft. A stop plate, which is a metal target with electronic that link to an IPSC shot timer, is used to stop the timer and collect the overall stage time. Minor scoring is used, with 5 points for the A zone, 3 points for the C zone and 1 point for the D zone. Metal targets have to be light enough to be knocked over, and are usually made of 3 mm aluminum or 1.7 mm steel. Popper metal targets are calibrated to require a good hit to make them fall.

== Equipment ==
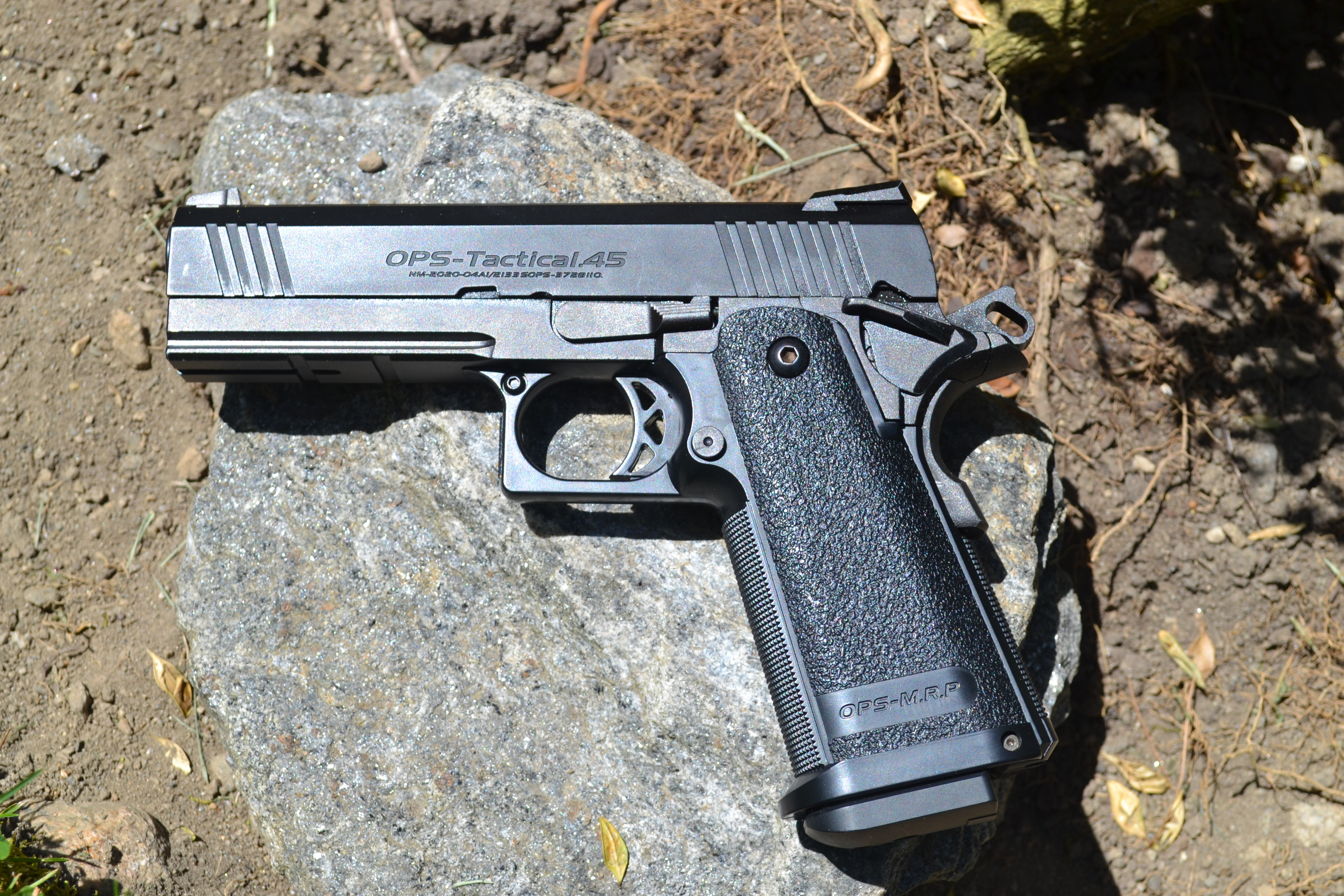
A Tokyo Marui airsoft pistol.

Action Air Open Division
Open has very few restrictions on the handgun, magazine capacity and equipment positioning. It is the only division where optical sights and compensators are permitted. Since most compensators are merely decorative on an airsoft pistol, adding a compensator allows a longer inner barrel to increase velocity and accuracy. The maximum magazine length is 170 mm and can have up to 28 rounds capacity.

Action Air Standard Division
The handgun has to fit the IPSC box, and there are restrictions on placement of holster and magazine pouches. Magazines must not extend more than 20 mm below the lowest point of the magazine well when inserted, and can have up to 18 rounds capacity.

Action Air Production Division
The handgun must be unmodified and be listed on the IPSC Production Division List. Maximum barrel length is 127 mm, and maximum magazine capacity is 15 rounds.

Action Air Classic Division
The pistol has to be a 1911 type, fit inside the IPSC box and can have up to 10 rounds capacity.

== Safety ==
Eye protection is mandatory, and even though airsoft is considered less dangerous than real firearms, all normal rules for firearm safety should apply in order to build good habits.

== See also ==
- IPSC Action Air World Shoot
- Tatsuya Sakai
- ActionAirgun
