= Michael Siva-Jothy =

Michael Siva Jothy
- Education: University College London (BSc) University of Oxford (PhD)
- Scientific career
- Workplaces: Nagoya University, University College London, University of Sheffield

Michael 'Mike' Siva-Jothy is an entomologist in the UK, he is Professor of Entomology at the University of Sheffield.

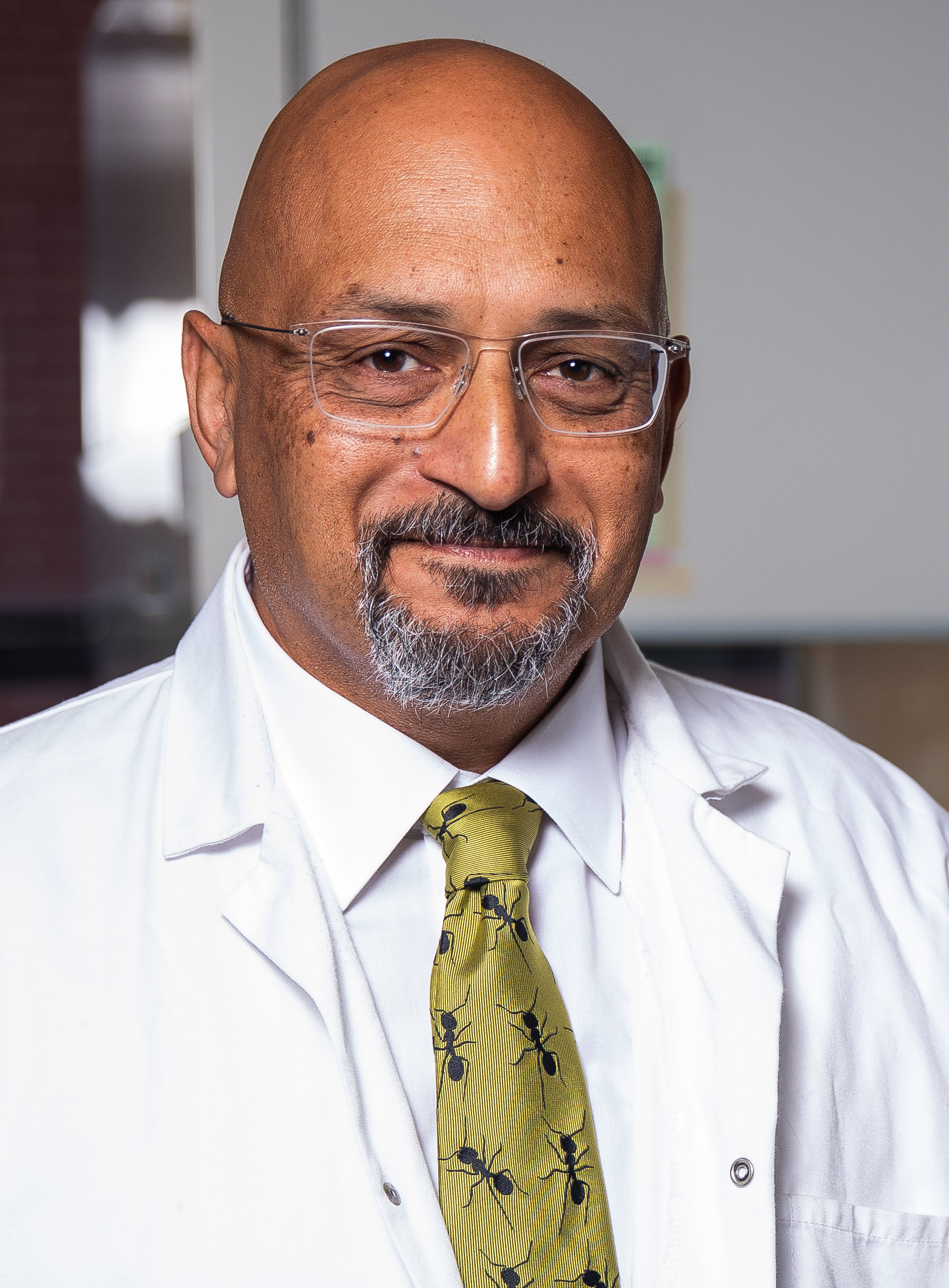

== Education and career ==
Siva-Jothy was educated at University College London graduating with a BSc in 1981, he then did a PhD at the University of Oxford graduating in 1985. He moved to Nagoya University in Japan as a Royal Society & Japan Society for the Promotion of Science Fellow until 1989, when he moved back to the UK to work as an Agricultural and Food Research Council research associate at University College London. In 1990 Siva-Jothy moved to the University of Sheffield to be a lecturer, where he has remained, progressing to Senior Lecturer and Reader, Professor in 2006 and was the Head of the Department of Plant and Amimal Sciences from 2012 to 2018.

== Research ==
Siva-Jothy's research looks at the sexual and life history traits of arthropods.

He worked on the mechanism of sperm competition in libellulid dragonflies for his PhD where he showed that Ecological drivers such as operational sex ratio selected for sperm competition mechanisms that were thorough (but took a long time) or were swift but did not result in long-lasting sperm precedence.

Siva-Jothy's early work in Japan developed this theme in an endemic damselfly, Mnais pruinosa, where Siva-Jothy showed that males could adopt different sperm-competition strategies depending on the likelihood that females would lay eggs immediately after mating or not

Later, he looked at insect mating preferences in damselflies and found, using infra red cameras, that females prefer males with a higher body temperatures, which could then lead to eggs being laid in more favourable warmer habitats.

He has extensively worked on bed bugs and found that female bed bugs prepare themselves for mating, protecting themselves from sexually transmitted infections by producing lysozyme, a bacteria killing enzyme and by boosting their immune system. His team have also found that bed bugs will feed on human blood for 10 to 20 minutes, increasing their body weight by up to 200 percent. With an international team he discovered that bed bug species have been around for at least 115 million years and survived the extinction of the dinosaurs.

With an experiment on insects and humans Siva-Jothy found that the hairs on human bodies can enable us to feel parasites on us and slow down their movement so that they take longer to find a feeding site.

== Honours and awards ==
Siva-Jothy's image of a Scarce swallowtail butterfly and a Polistine wasp on a Scabius flower won first place in the Community, Population and Macroecology category of the 2013 BioMed Central's Ecology Image Competition.
