= Kim Leppänen =

Finnish sport shooter (born 1989)

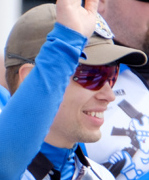
- Kim Leppänen at the opening ceremony of the 2017 IPSC Rifle World Shoot

Personal information
- Born: 12 April 1989 (age 37)
Medal record
IPSC
Representing Finland
IPSC Shotgun World Shoot
Gold medal – first place	2015 Agna	Manual
Silver medal – second place	2018 Châteauroux	Standard
IPSC Nordic Shotgun Championship
Silver medal – second place	2016 Loimaa	Standard
IPSC Finnish Shotgun Championship
Bronze medal – third place	2013	Manual

Kim Leppänen (born 12 April 1989) is a Finnish sport shooter who won the 2015 IPSC Shotgun World Shoot Manual division title, and was part of the Finnish Manual National Team together with Jaakko Viitala, Ari Matero and Mikael Ekberg which placed first in the team classification.

== See also ==
- Josh Froelich, American sport shooter
- Roberto Vezzoli, Italian sport shooter
