= IPSC Action Air World Shoots =

The World Championship in Practical Airsoft Shooting

Action Air
- Classification: ICS (IPSC Classification System)
- Sport: Practical shooting
- Founded: In the 1990s
- Motto: "Diligentia, Vis, Celeritas" (DVC), Latin for "precision, power, speed"
- No. of teams: National teams
- Country: Over 100
- Venue: Shooting ranges
- Confederation: African, Australasian, European and Pan-American Zones
- Most recent champion: (Hong Kong) Warout Lau (2018)
- Qualification: Region dependent number of slots. Regional selection procedures.
- Level on pyramid: 5
- Domestic cup: National championships
- Related competitions: IPSC Handgun, Rifle and Shotgun World Shoots
- Website: ipsc.org
- 2025 IPSC Action Air World Shoot

The IPSC Action Air World Shoot is the highest level Action Air match within the International Practical Shooting Confederation (IPSC). The Action Air World Shoots are currently held triennially on the same cycle as the IPSC Shotgun World Shoots.

The first Action Air World Shoot was held in 2018 at the KITEC Exhibition Centre in Hong Kong.

The second Action Air World Shoot was originally to be held in Sochi, Russia. However, in reaction to the 2022 Russian invasion of Ukraine, the IPSC cancelled it along with all scheduled and future level 3 and above international competitions in Russia.

== History ==
- 2018 Action Air World Shoot at the KITEC Exhibition Centre in Hong Kong
- 2025 Action Air World Shoot in Iloilo City, Philippines

== Individual Champions ==
=== Overall category ===
| Year | Division | Gold | Silver | Bronze | World Shoot |
|---|---|---|---|---|---|
| 2018 | Open | (Hong Kong) Chun Ki Wu | (Macau) Chi Man Sio | (Hong Kong) Chun Sing Yau | World Shoot I |
| 2018 | Standard | (Hong Kong) Warout Lau | (Hong Kong) Yin Tai Yenty Lee | (Hong Kong) Pak Lam Lai | World Shoot I |
| 2018 | Production | (Hong Kong) Yik Man Chan | (Hong Kong) Chak Sang Li | (Chinese Taipei) Teng Hsiung Chan | World Shoot I |
| 2018 | Classic | (Hong Kong) Ka Chun Chan | (Hong Kong) Chun Hin Justin Chan | (Hong Kong) Kwok Wai Ringo Ng | World Shoot I |

=== Lady category ===
| Year | Division | Gold | Silver | Bronze | World Shoot |
|---|---|---|---|---|---|
| 2018 | Open | (Hong Kong) Wing Tam | (Hong Kong) Yuen Ting Loo | (Hong Kong) Yuen Chong Lau | World Shoot I |
| 2018 | Standard | (Macau) Lei Kei Fong | (Hong Kong) Ka Yee Wong | (Hong Kong) Sin Yee Cindy Wan | World Shoot I |
| 2018 | Production | (Hong Kong) Ying Tung Lau | (Hong Kong) Ka Yan Mok | (Hong Kong) Ling Kiu Ku | World Shoot I |

=== Junior category ===
| Year | Division | Gold | Silver | Bronze | World Shoot |
|---|---|---|---|---|---|
| 2018 | Open | (Hong Kong) Sze Yuen Lee | (Spain) Francisco Javie Honrubia Ruiz | (Philippines) Jerico Navarro | World Shoot I |
| 2018 | Standard | (Hong Kong) Tsz Him Wong | (United Kingdom) Paul Wyborn | (Russia) Alexsandr Tarasov | World Shoot I |
| 2018 | Production | (Russia) Kirill Semenov | (Russia) Mikhail Dorofeev | (Russia) Ekaterina Iakimova | World Shoot I |
| 2018 | Classic | (Philippines) Allen Paul Marcos | (Russia) Maksim Shmelev | (Russia) Alena Fedorova | World Shoot I |

=== Senior category ===
| Year | Division | Gold | Silver | Bronze | World Shoot |
|---|---|---|---|---|---|
| 2018 | Open | (Hong Kong) Kwok Fai Lo | (Hong Kong) Wai Leung Woo | (Hong Kong) Chi Wai Lau | World Shoot I |
| 2018 | Standard | (Hong Kong) Ka Ming Leung | (Hong Kong) Ping Ki Norman Hung | (Hong Kong) Nai Yee Tom Tam | World Shoot I |
| 2018 | Production | (Hong Kong) Wai Fung Lee | (Hong Kong) Chun Hung Li | (Papua New Guinea) Alfred Reu | World Shoot I |
| 2018 | Classic | (Macau) Io On Au | (Macau) Hui Wo Leung | (Macau) Chi Keong Chang | World Shoot I |

=== Super Senior category ===
| Year | Division | Gold | Silver | Bronze | World Shoot |
|---|---|---|---|---|---|
| 2018 | Open | (Hong Kong) Ping Shing Wong | (Hong Kong) Kwong Sang Lai | (Hong Kong) Man Tsang | World Shoot I |

== See also ==
- IPSC Handgun World Shoots
- IPSC Rifle World Shoots
- IPSC Shotgun World Shoots
- List of world sports championships
