= List of firearms (S) =

This is a list of small arms—including pistols, shotguns, sniper rifles, submachine guns, personal defense weapons, assault rifles, battle rifles, designated marksman rifles, carbines, machine guns, flamethrowers, multiple-barrel firearms, grenade launchers, and anti-tank rifles—that includes variants.

== List ==
- Sarsılmaz
- Schaich automatic rifle (US - Battle Rifle - .30-06 Springfield)
- Schirgun Corporation
- Schirokauer machine gun (US - Machine gun - .30-06 Springfield)
- Schwarz chest plate gun (US - - :Chest plate mounted "machine gun")
- Société Alsacienne de Constructions Mécaniques de Cholet
- Pistols
- SCAM modèle 1935A (France - Semi-Automatic Pistol - 7.65×20mm Longue: SIG Sauer P210 Variant)
- Safir Arms
- Rifles
- Safir T-15 (Republic of Turkey - Semi-Automatic Carbine - 5.56×45mm NATO)
- Safir T-16 (Republic of Turkey - Carbine - 5.56×45mm NATO)
- Safir T-17 (Republic of Turkey - Assault Rifle - 5.56×45mm NATO)
- Shotguns
- Safir T-14 (Republic of Turkey - Semi-Automatic Shotgun - .410 Bore)
- Saurio S.A.
- Saurio mod. 300 ( - Shotgun - )
- Saurio mod. 500 ( - Pistol - .22LR)
- Saurio mod. 600 ( - Semi Automatic Rifle - .22LR)
- Saurio mod. 700 ( - Lever Action Rifle - .22LR)
- Shooters Arms
- SAS-12 (Philippines - Shotgun - 12 Gauge)
- Smith & Wesson
- Pistols
- S&W .45 Limited (US - Semi-Automatic Pistol - .45 ACP)
- S&W .45 Recon (US - Semi-Automatic Pistol - .45 ACP)
- S&W Bodyguard .380 (US - Semi-Automatic Pistol - .380ACP)
- S&W M&P (US - Semi-Automatic Pistol - Various)
- S&W M&P9 Bodyguard 380 (US - Semi-Automatic Pistol - .380 ACP)
- S&W M&P Compact (US - Semi-Automatic Pistol - 9×19mm Parabellum, .357 SIG, .40 S&W)
- S&W M&P Full Size (US - Semi-Automatic Pistol - 9×19mm Parabellum, .357 SIG, .40 S&W)
- S&W M&P Mid-Size (US - Semi-Compact Semi-Automatic Pistol - 9×19mm Parabellum, .357 SIG, .40 S&W)
- S&W M&P Shield (US - Semi-Automatic Pistol - 9×19mm Parabellum, .40 S&W)
- S&W M&P9 (US - Semi-Automatic Pistol - 9×19mm Parabellum)
- S&W M&P9 Pro Series (US - Semi-Automatic Pistol - 9×19mm Parabellum)
- S&W M&P9 Pro Series 5" (US - Semi-Automatic Pistol - 9×19mm Parabellum)
- S&W M&P9L (US - Semi-Automatic Pistol - 9×19mm Parabellum)
- S&W M&P22X (US - Semi-Automatic Pistol - .22 Long Rifle)
- S&W M&P40 (US - Semi-Automatic Pistol - .40 S&W)
- S&W M&P40 Pro Series (US - Semi-Automatic Pistol - .40 S&W)
- S&W M&P40 Pro Series 5" (US - Semi-Automatic Pistol - .40 S&W)
- S&W M&P45 (US - Semi-Automatic Pistol - .45 ACP)
- S&W M&P45 Full Size (US - Semi-Automatic Pistol - .45 ACP)
- S&W M&P45 Mid-Size (US - Semi-Compact Semi-Automatic Pistol - .45 ACP)
- S&W M&P45c (US - Compact Semi-Automatic Pistol - .45 ACP)
- S&W Model 22A (US - Semi-Automatic Pistol - .22 Long Rifle)
- S&W Model 22S (US - Semi-Automatic Pistol - .22 Long Rifle)
- S&W Model 39 (US - Semi-Automatic Pistol - 9×19mm Parabellum, .40 S&W)
- S&W Model 3566 (US - Semi-Automatic Pistol - .356 TSW)
- S&W Model 41 (US - Semi-Automatic Pistol - .22 Long Rifle)
- S&W Model 46 (US - Semi-Automatic Pistol - .22 Long Rifle)
- S&W Model 44 (US - Semi-Automatic Pistol - 9×19mm Parabellum)
- S&W Model 52 (US - Semi-Automatic Pistol - .38 S&W Special Wadcutter)
- S&W Model 52A (US - Semi-Automatic Pistol - .38 AMU)
- S&W Model 59 (US - Semi-Automatic Pistol - 9×19mm Parabellum Parabellum)
- S&W Model 459 (US - Semi-Automatic Pistol - 9×19mm Parabellum)
- S&W Model 62 (US - Semi-Automatic Pistol - .45 ACP)
- S&W Model 147A (US - Semi-Automatic Pistol - 9×19mm Parabellum)
- S&W Model 410 (US - Semi-Automatic Pistol - .40 S&W)
- S&W Model 411 (US - Semi-Automatic Pistol - .40 S&W)
- S&W Model 422 (US - Semi-Automatic Pistol - .22 Long Rifle)
- S&W Model 61 (US - Semi-Automatic Pistol - .22 Long Rifle)
- S&W Model 622 (US - Semi-Automatic Pistol - .22 Long Rifle)
- S&W Model 2206 (US - Semi-Automatic Pistol - .22 Long Rifle)
- S&W Model 2213 (US - Semi-Automatic Pistol - .22 Long Rifle)
- S&W Model 2214 (US - Semi-Automatic Pistol - .22 Long Rifle)
- S&W Model 439 (US - Semi-Automatic Pistol - 9×19mm Parabellum)
- S&W Model 457 (US - Semi-Automatic Pistol - .45 ACP)
- S&W Model 469 (US - Compact Semi-Automatic Pistol - 9×19mm Parabellum)
- S&W Model 539 (US - Semi-Automatic Pistol - 9×19mm Parabellum)
- S&W Model 559 (US - Semi-Automatic Pistol - 9×19mm Parabellum)
- S&W Model 639 (US - Semi-Automatic Pistol - 9×19mm Parabellum)
- S&W Model 645(US - Semi-Automatic Pistol - .45 ACP)
- S&W Model 745(US - Semi-Automatic Pistol - .45 ACP)
- S&W Model 659(US - Semi-Automatic Pistol - 9×19mm Parabellum)
- S&W Model 669 (US - Semi-Automatic Pistol - 9×19mm Parabellum)
- S&W Model 845 (US - Semi-Automatic Pistol - .45 ACP)
- S&W Model 910 (US - Semi-Automatic Pistol - 9×19mm Parabellum)
- S&W Model 908 (US - Compact Semi-Automatic Pistol - 9×19mm Parabellum)
- S&W Model 909 (US - Semi-Automatic Pistol - 9×19mm Parabellum)
- S&W Model 915 (US - Semi-Automatic Pistol - 9×19mm Parabellum)
- S&W Model 945 (US - Semi-Automatic Pistol - .40 S&W, .45 ACP)
- S&W Model 952 (US - Semi-Automatic Pistol - 9×19mm Parabellum)
- S&W Model 1006 (US - Semi-Automatic Pistol - 10mm Auto)
- S&W Model 1026 (US - Semi-Automatic Pistol - 10mm Auto)
- S&W Model 1046 (US - Semi-Automatic Pistol - 10mm Auto)
- S&W Model 1066 (US - Semi-Automatic Pistol - 10mm Auto)
- S&W Model 1076 (US - Semi-Automatic Pistol - 10mm Auto)
- S&W Model 1086(US - Semi-Automatic Pistol - 10mm Auto)
- S&W Model 3904 (US - Semi-Automatic Pistol - 9×19mm Parabellum)
- S&W Model 3906(US - Semi-Automatic Pistol - 9×19mm Parabellum)
- S&W Model 3913(US - Semi-Automatic Pistol - 9×19mm Parabellum)
- S&W Model 3913TSW(US - Semi-Automatic Pistol - 9×19mm Parabellum)
- S&W Model 3914 (US - Semi-Automatic Pistol - 9×19mm Parabellum)
- S&W Model 3953 (US - Semi-Automatic Pistol - 9×19mm Parabellum)
- S&W Model 3953TSW (US - Semi-Automatic Pistol - 9×19mm Parabellum)
- S&W Model 3954 (US - Semi-Automatic Pistol - 9×19mm Parabellum)
- S&W Model 3958 (US - Semi-Automatic Pistol - 9×19mm Parabellum)
- S&W Model 4003 (US - Semi-Automatic Pistol - .40 S&W)
- S&W Model 4003TSW (US - Semi-Automatic Pistol - .40 S&W)
- S&W Model 4004 (US - Semi-Automatic Pistol - .40 S&W)
- S&W Model 4006 (US - Semi-Automatic Pistol - .40 S&W)
- S&W Model 4006TSW (US - Semi-Automatic Pistol - .40 S&W)
- S&W Model 4013 (US - Semi-Automatic Pistol - .40 S&W)
- S&W Model 4013TSW (US - Semi-Automatic Pistol - .40 S&W)
- S&W Model 4014 (US - Semi-Automatic Pistol - .40 S&W)
- S&W Model 4026 (US - Semi-Automatic Pistol - .40 S&W)
- S&W Model 4040 (US - Semi-Automatic Pistol - .40 S&W)
- S&W Model 4043 (US - Semi-Automatic Pistol - .40 S&W)
- S&W Model 4043TSW(US - Semi-Automatic Pistol - .40 S&W)
- S&W Model 4044 (US - Semi-Automatic Pistol - .40 S&W)
- S&W Model 4046 (US - Semi-Automatic Pistol - .40 S&W)
- S&W Model 4046TSW(US - Semi-Automatic Pistol - .40 S&W)
- S&W Model 4053 (US - Semi-Automatic Pistol - .40 S&W)
- S&W Model 4053TSW (US - Semi-Automatic Pistol - .40 S&W)
- S&W Model 4054 (US - Semi-Automatic Pistol - .40 S&W)
- S&W Model 4056TSW (US - Semi-Automatic Pistol - .40 S&W)
- S&W Model 4506 (US - Semi-Automatic Pistol - .45 ACP)
- S&W Model 4505 (US - Semi-Automatic Pistol - .45 ACP)
- S&W Model 4516 (US - Semi-Automatic Pistol - .45 ACP)
- S&W Model 4546 (US - Semi-Automatic Pistol - .45 ACP)
- S&W Model 4563 (US - Semi-Automatic Pistol - .45 ACP)
- S&W Model 4563TSW (US - Semi-Automatic Pistol - .45 ACP)
- S&W Model 4566 (US - Semi-Automatic Pistol - .45 ACP)
- S&W Model 4566TSW (US - Semi-Automatic Pistol - .45 ACP)
- S&W Model 4567 (US - Semi-Automatic Pistol - .45 ACP)
- S&W Model 4586 (US - Semi-Automatic Pistol - .45 ACP)
- S&W Model 4586TSW (US - Semi-Automatic Pistol - .45 ACP)
- S&W Model 4513TSW (US - Semi-Automatic Pistol - .45 ACP)
- S&W Model 4526 (US - Semi-Automatic Pistol - .45 ACP)
- S&W Model 4536 (US - Semi-Automatic Pistol - .45 ACP)
- S&W Model 4553TSW (US - Semi-Automatic Pistol - .45 ACP)
- S&W Model 4556 (US - Semi-Automatic Pistol - .45 ACP)
- S&W Model 4576 (US - Semi-Automatic Pistol - .45 ACP)
- S&W Model 4583TSW (US - Semi-Automatic Pistol - .45 ACP)
- S&W Model 4596 (US - Semi-Automatic Pistol - .45 ACP)
- S&W Model 5903 (US - Semi-Automatic Pistol - 9×19mm Parabellum)
- S&W Model 5903TSW (US - Semi-Automatic Pistol - 9×19mm Parabellum)
- S&W Model 5904 (US - Semi-Automatic Pistol - 9×19mm Parabellum)
- S&W Model 5905 (US - Semi-Automatic Pistol - 9×19mm Parabellum)
- S&W Model 5906 (US - Semi-Automatic Pistol - 9×19mm Parabellum)
- S&W Model 5906TSW (US - Semi-Automatic Pistol - 9×19mm Parabellum)
- S&W Model 5924 (US - Semi-Automatic Pistol - 9×19mm Parabellum)
- S&W Model 5926 (US - Semi-Automatic Pistol - 9×19mm Parabellum)
- S&W Model 5943 (US - Semi-Automatic Pistol - 9×19mm Parabellum)
- S&W Model 5943TSW (US - Semi-Automatic Pistol - 9×19mm Parabellum)
- S&W Model 5944 (US - Semi-Automatic Pistol - 9×19mm Parabellum)
- S&W Model 5946 (US - Semi-Automatic Pistol - 9×19mm Parabellum)
- S&W Model 5946TSW (US - Semi-Automatic Pistol - 9×19mm Parabellum)
- S&W Model 5967 (US - Semi-Automatic Pistol - 9×19mm Parabellum)
- S&W Model 6904 (US - Semi-Automatic Pistol - 9×19mm Parabellum)
- S&W Model 6906(US - Semi-Automatic Pistol - 9×19mm Parabellum)
- S&W Model 6924 (US - Semi-Automatic Pistol - 9×19mm Parabellum)
- S&W Model 6926 (US - Semi-Automatic Pistol - 9×19mm Parabellum)
- S&W Model 6944 (US - Semi-Automatic Pistol - 9×19mm Parabellum)
- S&W Model 6946 (US - Semi-Automatic Pistol - 9×19mm Parabellum)
- S&W Model CQB (US - Semi-Automatic Pistol - .45 ACP)
- S&W Model CS9 (US - Semi-Automatic Pistol - 9×19mm Parabellum)
- S&W Model CS40 (US - Semi-Automatic Pistol - .40 S&W)
- S&W Model CS45 (US - Semi-Automatic Pistol - .45 ACP)
- S&W Shorty Forty (US - Semi-Automatic Pistol - .40 S&W)
- S&W Shorty 45(US - Semi-Automatic Pistol - .45 ACP)
- S&W Sigma(US - Semi-Automatic Pistol - 9×19mm Parabellum, .357 SIG, .380, .40 S&W)
- S&W SW9(US - Semi-Automatic Pistol - 9×19mm Parabellum)
- S&W SW9C(US - Semi-Automatic Pistol - 9×19mm Parabellum)
- S&W SW9E(US - Semi-Automatic Pistol - 9×19mm Parabellum)
- S&W SW9F (US - Semi-Automatic Pistol - 9×19mm Parabellum)
- S&W SW9G (US - Semi-Automatic Pistol - 9×19mm Parabellum)
- S&W SW9M(US - Semi-Automatic Pistol - 9×19mm Parabellum)
- S&W SW9P (US - Semi-Automatic Pistol - 9×19mm Parabellum)
- S&W SW9V (US - Semi-Automatic Pistol - 9×19mm Parabellum)
- S&W SW9VE(US - Semi-Automatic Pistol - 9×19mm Parabellum)
- S&W SW40 (US - Semi-Automatic Pistol - .40 S&W)
- S&W SW40C (US - Semi-Automatic Pistol - .40 S&W)
- S&W SW40E (US - Semi-Automatic Pistol - .40 S&W)
- S&W SW40F (US - Semi-Automatic Pistol - .40 S&W)
- S&W SW40V (US - Semi-Automatic Pistol - .40 S&W)
- S&W SW40VE (US - Semi-Automatic Pistol - .40 S&W)
- S&W SW357V (US - Semi-Automatic Pistol - .357 SIG)
- S&W SW380M (US - Subcompact Semi-Automatic Pistol - .380 ACP)
- S&W Single-Shot (US - Single-Shot Pistol - Various)
- S&W First Model Single-Shot (US - Single-Shot Pistol - .22 Long Rifle, .32 S&W, .38 S&W)
- S&W Second Model Single-Shot (US - Single-Shot Pistol - .22 Long Rifle)
- S&W Third Model Single-Shot (US - Single-Shot Pistol - .22 Long Rifle)
- S&W Fourth Model Single-Shot(US - Single-Shot Pistol - .22 Long Rifle)
- S&W Super 9 (US - Semi-Automatic Pistol - 9×19mm Parabellum, 9×21mm IMI, .356 TSW)
- S&W SW99 (US - Semi-Automatic Pistol - 9×19mm Parabellum, .40 S&W, .45 ACP)
- S&W SW99C (US - Compact Semi-Automatic Pistol - 9×19mm Parabellum, .40 S&W)
- S&W SW99QA (US - Semi-Automatic Pistol - 9×19mm Parabellum, .40 S&W, .45 ACP)
- S&W SW990 (US - Semi-Automatic Pistol - 9×19mm Parabellum, .40 S&W, .45 ACP)
- S&W SW990L (US - Semi-Automatic Pistol - 9×19mm Parabellum, .40 S&W, .45 ACP)
- S&W SW990L Compact (US - Compact Semi-Automatic Pistol - 9×19mm Parabellum, .40 S&W, .45 ACP)
- S&W SW1911 (US - Semi-Automatic Pistol - .38 Super Automatic, .45 ACP)
- Thompson-Center Contender (US - Single-Shot Break Action Pistol - Various)
- Revolvers
- S&W Number 1 (US - Single-Action Revolver - .22 Short Blackpowder)
- S&W Number 1½ (US - Single-Action Revolver - .32 Rimfire )
- S&W Number 2 (US - Single-Action Revolver - .32 Long Rimfire)
- S&W Number 3 Pocket Pistol (US - Compact Single-Action Revolver - .41 S&W Rimfire)
- S&W .22 Ladysmith (US - Single-Action Revolver - .22 Long)
- S&W .22/32 Hand Ejector (US - Single-Action Revolver - .22 Long Rifle)
- S&W .22/32 Target Model (US - Single-Action Revolver - .22 Long Rifle)
- S&W Model of 1953 .22/32 Target (US - Single-Action Revolver - .22 Long Rifle)
- S&W Model of 1953 .22/32 Kit Gun (US - Single-Action Revolver - .22 Long Rifle)
- S&W Model of 1955 .22/32 Kit Gun Airweight (US - Single-Action Revolver - .22 Long Rifle)
- S&W .32 Double Action (US - Double-Action Revolver - .32 S&W Blackpowder)
- S&W .32 Safety Hammerless (US - Revolver - .32 S&W Blackpowder)
- S&W .32 Single Action (US - Single-Action Revolver - .32 S&W Blackpowder)
- S&W .32-20 Hand Ejector (US - Single-Action Revolver - .32-20 Winchester)
- S&W .32-20 Hand Ejector Model of 1902 (US - Single-Action Revolver - .32-20 Winchester)
- S&W .32-20 Hand Ejector Model of 1905 (US - Single-Action Revolver - .32-20 Winchester)
- S&W .38 Chief's Special (US - Single-Action Revolver - .38 S&W Special)
- S&W Aircrewman (US - Single-Action Revolver - .38 S&W Special)
- S&W .38 DA Perfected (US - Double-Action Revolver - .38 S&W Blackpowder)
- S&W .38 Double Action (US - Double-Action Revolver - .38 S&W Blackpowder)
- S&W .32 Hand Ejector (US - Single-Action Revolver - .32 S&W Long: Model 1896)
- S&W .32 Hand Ejector Model of 1903(US - Single-Action Revolver - .32 S&W Long)
- S&W .32 Regulation Police (US - Single-Action Revolver - .32 S&W Long)
- S&W .38/32 Terrier (US - Single-Action Revolver - .38 S&W Long)
- S&W .38 Military & Police (US - Single-Action Revolver - .38 Long Colt, .38 S&W Special)
- S&W .38 Military & Police Model of 1902 (US - Single-Action Revolver - .38 S&W Special)
- S&W .38 Military & Police Model of 1905 (US - Single-Action Revolver - .38 S&W Special)
- S&W .38 Military & Police Victory Model (US - Single-Action Revolver - .38 S&W Special)
- S&W .38 Military & Police Airweight (US - Single-Action Revolver - .38 S&W Special)
- S&W M13 Aircrewman (US - Single-Action Revolver - .38 S&W Special)
- S&W .38 Safety Hammerless (US - Single-Action Revolver - .38 S&W Blackpowder)
- S&W .38 Single Action (US - Single-Action Revolver - .38 S&W Blackpowder)
- S&W .38 Winchester Double Action (US - Double-Action Revolver - .38-40 Winchester)
- S&W .38/44 Heavy Duty (US - Double-Action Revolver - .38 S&W Special)
- S&W .38/44 Outdoorsman (US - Double-Action Revolver - .38 S&W Special)
- S&W .44 Double Action (US - Double-Action Revolver - .44 Russian)
- S&W .44 Double Action Frontier (US - Double-Action Revolver - .44-40 Winchester)
- S&W .44 Hand Ejector First Model (US - Double-Action Revolver - .44 S&W Special)
- S&W New Century (US - Double-Action Revolver - .44 S&W Special)
- S&W Triplz Lock (US - Double-Action Revolver - .38-40 Winchester, .44 Russian, .44 S&W Special, .44-40 Winchester, .45 Schofield, .45 Colt, .455 Mark II)
- S&W .44 Military Model of 1908 (US - Double-Action Revolver - .44 S&W Special)
- S&W .44 Hand Ejector Second Model (US - Double-Action Revolver - .38-40 Winchester, .44 S&W Special, .44-40 Winchester, .45 Colt)
- S&W .44 Hand Ejector Third Model (US - Double-Action Revolver - .44 S&W Special, .44-40 Winchester, .45 Colt)
- S&W .44 Magnum (US - Double-Action Revolver - .44 Remington Magnum)
- S&W .45 Hand Ejector US Service Model of 1917 (US - Double-Action Revolver - .45 ACP)
- S&W Model of 1917 Army (US - Double-Action Revolver - .45 ACP)
- S&W Model of 1950 (US - Double-Action Revolver - .45 ACP & .45 Colt)
- S&W Model of 1955 .45 Target (US - Double-Action Revolver - .45 ACP)
- S&W .357 Combat Magnum (US - Double-Action Revolver - .357 Magnum)
- S&W .455 Mark II Hand Ejector (US - Double-Action Revolver - .45 Colt, .455 Mark II)
- S&W Model of 1926 .44 Military (US - Double-Action Revolver - .44 S&W Special)
- S&W Model of 1950 .44 Military (US - Double-Action Revolver - .44 S&W Special)
- S&W .44 Hand Ejector Fourth Model Target (US - Double-Action Revolver - .44 S&W Special)
- S&W American (US - Single-Action Revolver - .44 Henry, .44 S&W American)
- S&W Russian (US - Single-Action Revolver - .44 Henry, .44 Russian)
- S&W Schofield (US - Single-Action Revolver - .45 Schofield)
- S&W Bodyguard Airweight (US - Double-Action Revolver - .38 S&W Special)
- S&W Centennial (US - Double-Action Revolver - .38 S&W Special)
- S&W K-22 (US - Double-Action Revolver - .22 Long Rifle)
- S&W .22 Military & Police (US - Double-Action Revolver - .22 Long Rifle)
- S&W K-32 (US - Double-Action Revolver - .32 S&W Long)
- S&W .32 Military & Police (US - Double-Action Revolver - .32 S&W Long)
- S&W K-38 (US - Double-Action Revolver - .38 S&W Special)
- S&W K-200 (US - Double-Action Revolver - .38/200, .38 S&W Long)
- S&W Highway Patrolman (US - Double-Action Revolver - .357 S&W Magnum)
- S&W Model 10 (US - Double-Action Revolver - .38 S&W Special)
- S&W Model 11 (US - Double-Action Revolver - .38/200, .38 S&W)
- S&W Model 12 (US - Double-Action Revolver - .38 S&W Special)
- S&W Model 13 (US - Double-Action Revolver - .357 S&W Magnum)
- S&W Model 14 (US - Double-Action Revolver - .38 S&W Special)
- S&W Model 15 (US - Double-Action Revolver - .38 S&W Special)
- S&W Model 16 (US - Double-Action Revolver - .32 S&W Long)
- S&W Model 16-4 (US - Double-Action Revolver - .32 H&R Magnum)
- S&W Model 17 (US - Double-Action Revolver - .22 Long Rifle)
- S&W Model 18 (US - Double-Action Revolver - .22 Long Rifle)
- S&W Model 19 (US - Double-Action Revolver - .357 S&W Magnum)
- S&W Model 20 (US - Double-Action Revolver - .38 S&W Special)
- S&W Model 21 (US - Double-Action Revolver - .44 S&W Special)
- S&W Model 22 (US - Double-Action Revolver - .45 ACP)
- S&W Model 23 (US - Double-Action Revolver - .38 S&W Special)
- S&W Model 24 (US - Double-Action Revolver - .44 S&W Special)
- S&W Model 25-2 (US - Double-Action Revolver - .45 ACP)
- S&W Model 25-5 (US - Double-Action Revolver - .45 Colt)
- S&W Model 26 (US - Double-Action Revolver - .45 ACP)
- S&W Model 27 (US - Double-Action Revolver - .357 S&W Magnum)
- S&W Model 28 (US - Double-Action Revolver - .357 S&W Magnum)
- S&W Model 29 (US - Double-Action Revolver - .44 Remington Magnum)
- S&W Model 30 (US - Double-Action Revolver - .32 S&W Long)
- S&W Model 31 (US - Double-Action Revolver - .32 S&W Long)
- S&W Model 32 (US - Double-Action Revolver - .38 S&W)
- S&W Model 33 (US - Double-Action Revolver - .38 S&W)
- S&W Model 34 (US - Double-Action Revolver - .22 Long Rifle)
- S&W Model 35 (US - Double-Action Revolver - .22 Long Rifle)
- S&W Model 36 (US - Double-Action Revolver - .38 S&W Special)
- S&W Model 37 (US - Double-Action Revolver - .38 S&W Special)
- S&W Model 38 (US - Double-Action Revolver - .38 S&W Special)
- S&W Model 40 (US - Double-Action Revolver - .38 S&W Special)
- S&W Model 42 (US - Double-Action Revolver - .38 S&W Special)
- S&W Model 43 (US - Double-Action Revolver - .22 Long Rifle)
- S&W Model 45 (US - Double-Action Revolver - .22 Long Rifle)
- S&W Model 48 (US - Double-Action Revolver - .22 Winchester Magnum Rimfire:)
- S&W Model 49 (US - Double-Action Revolver - .38 S&W Special)
- S&W Model 50 (US - Double-Action Revolver - .38 S&W Special)
- S&W Model 51 (US - Double-Action Revolver - .22 Winchester Magnum Rimfire)
- S&W Model 53 (US - Double-Action Revolver - .22 Jet)
- S&W Model 56 (US - Double-Action Revolver - .38 S&W Special)
- S&W Model 57 (US - Double-Action Revolver - .41 Remington Magnum)
- S&W Model 58 (US - Double-Action Revolver - .41 Remington Magnum)
- S&W Model 60 (US - Double-Action Revolver - .38 S&W Special)
- S&W Model 60-9 (US - Double-Action Revolver - .357 S&W Magnum)
- S&W Model 63 (US - Double-Action Revolver - .22 Long Rifle)
- S&W Model 64 (US - Double-Action Revolver - .38 S&W Special)
- S&W Model 65 (US - Double-Action Revolver - .357 S&W Magnum)
- S&W Model 66 (US - Double-Action Revolver - .357 S&W Magnum)
- S&W Model 67 (US - Double-Action Revolver - .38 S&W Special)
- S&W Model 68 (US - Double-Action Revolver - .38 S&W Special)
- S&W Model 73 (US - Double-Action Revolver - .38 S&W Special)
- S&W Model 242 (US - Double-Action Revolver - .38 S&W Special)
- S&W Model 296 (US - Double-Action Revolver - .44 S&W Special)
- S&W Model 317 (US - Double-Action Revolver - .22 Long Rifle)
- S&W Model 325 (US - Double-Action Revolver - .45 ACP)
- S&W Model 327(US - Double-Action Revolver - .357 S&W Magnum)
- S&W Model 329 (US - Double-Action Revolver - .44 Remington Magnum)
- S&W Model 331 (US - Double-Action Revolver - .32 H&R Magnum)
- S&W Model 332 (US - Double-Action Revolver - .32 H&R Magnum)
- S&W Model 337 (US - Double-Action Revolver - .38 S&W Special)
- S&W Model 340 (US - Double-Action Revolver - .357 S&W Magnum)
- S&W Model 342 (US - Double-Action Revolver - .38 S&W Special)
- S&W Model 351 (US - Double-Action Revolver - .22 Winchester Magnum Rimfire)
- S&W Model 357 (US - Double-Action Revolver - .41 Remington Magnum)
- S&W Model 360 (US - Double-Action Revolver - .357 S&W Magnum)
- S&W Model 386 (US - Double-Action Revolver - .357 S&W Magnum)
- S&W Model 396 (US - Double-Action Revolver - .44 S&W Special)
- S&W Model 431 (US - Double-Action Revolver - .32 H&R Magnum)
- S&W Model 432 (US - Double-Action Revolver - .32 H&R Magnum)
- S&W Model 442 (US - Double-Action Revolver - .38 S&W Special)
- S&W Model 460XVR (US - Double-Action Revolver - .460 S&W Magnum)
- S&W Model 500 (US - Double-Action Revolver - .500 S&W Magnum)
- S&W Model 520 (US - Double-Action Revolver - .357 S&W Magnum)
- S&W Model 520 (US - Double-Action Revolver - .357 S&W Magnum)
- S&W Model 544 (US - Double-Action Revolver - .44-40 Winchester)
- S&W Model 547 (US - Double-Action Revolver - 9×19mm Parabellum)
- S&W Model 581 (US - Double-Action Revolver - .357 S&W Magnum)
- S&W Model 586 (US - Double-Action Revolver - .357 S&W Magnum)
- S&W Model 610 (US - Double-Action Revolver - 10mm Auto)
- S&W Model 617 (US - Double-Action Revolver - .22 Long Rifle)
- S&W Model 619 (US - Double-Action Revolver - .357 S&W Magnum)
- S&W Model 620 (US - Double-Action Revolver - .357 S&W Magnum)
- S&W Model 624 (US - Double-Action Revolver - .44 S&W Special)
- S&W Model 625 (US - Double-Action Revolver - .45 ACP)
- S&W Model 625-2 (US - Double-Action Revolver - .45 ACP)
- S&W Model 625-3 (US - Double-Action Revolver - .45 ACP)
- S&W Model 625-8 (US - Double-Action Revolver - .45 ACP)
- S&W Model 625-10 (US - Double-Action Revolver - .45 ACP)
- S&W Model 625 Mountain Gun(US - Double-Action Revolver - .45 ACP)
- S&W Model 627 (US - Double-Action Revolver - .357 S&W Magnum, .38 Super Automatic)
- S&W Model 629 (US - Double-Action Revolver - .44 Remington Magnum)
- S&W Model 631 (US - Double-Action Revolver - .32 H&R Magnum)
- S&W Model 632 (US - Double-Action Revolver - .32 H&R Magnum)
- S&W Model 637 (US - Double-Action Revolver - .38 S&W Special)
- S&W Model 637 (US - Double-Action Revolver - .38 S&W Special)
- S&W Model 640 (US - Double-Action Revolver - .38 S&W Special)
- S&W Model 640-1 (US - Double-Action Revolver - .357 S&W Magnum)
- S&W Model 642 (US - Double-Action Revolver - .38 S&W Special)
- S&W Model 646 (US - Double-Action Revolver - .40 S&W)
- S&W Model 647 (US - Double-Action Revolver - .17 Hornady Magnum Rimfire)
- S&W Model 648 (US - Double-Action Revolver - .22 Winchester Magnum Rimfire)
- S&W Model 649 (US - Double-Action Revolver - .38 S&W Special)
- S&W Model 649-3 (US - Double-Action Revolver - .357 S&W Magnum)
- S&W Model 650 (US - Double-Action Revolver - .22 Winchester Magnum Rimfire)
- S&W Model 651 (US - Double-Action Revolver - .22 Winchester Magnum Rimfire)
- S&W Model 657 (US - Double-Action Revolver - .41 Remington Magnum)
- S&W Model 681 (US - Double-Action Revolver - .357 S&W Magnum)
- S&W Model 686 (US - Double-Action Revolver - .357 S&W Magnum, .38 Super Automatic)
- S&W Model 686 (US - Double-Action Revolver - .357 S&W Magnum, .38 S&W Special)
- S&W Model 686P (US - Double-Action Revolver - .357 S&W Magnum, .38 S&W Special P+)
- S&W Model 686PP (US - Double-Action Revolver - .357 S&W Magnum, .38 S&W Special P++)
- S&W Model 696 (US - Double-Action Revolver - .44 S&W Special)
- S&W Model 940 (US - Double-Action Revolver - 9×19mm Parabellum)
- S&W Model 944 (US - Double-Action Revolver - 9×19mm Parabellum)
- S&W New Model 3 (US - Single-Action Revolver - .44 Henry, .44 S&W American)
- S&W New Model 3 Single Action(US - Single-Action Revolver - .32 S&W Blackpowder, .32-44 S&W Special, .320 S&W Revolving Rifle, .38 S&W Blackpowder, .38 Colt, .38-40 Winchester, .38-44 S&W Special, .41 S&W, .44 Henry, .44 American, .44-40 Winchester, .45 Schofield, .450 Revolver, .45 Webley, .455 Mark I, .455 Mark II)
- S&W New Model 3 Target Model (US - Single-Action Revolver - .32-44 S&W Special, .38-44 S&W Special)
- S&W New Model 3 Turkish(US - Single-Action Revolver - .44 Henry)
- S&W New Model 3 Frontier (US - Single-Action Revolver - .44-40 Winchester)
- S&W New Model 3 .38 Winchester (US - Single-Action Revolver - .38-40 Winchester)
- Rifles
- Smith & Wesson Model 1500 (US - Bolt-Action Rifle - .30-06 Springfield)
- S&W Model 1940 Light Rifle (US - Semi-Automatic Carbine - 9×19mm Parabellum)
- S&W M&P15 (US - Semi-Automatic Rifle - 5.56×45mm NATO, .223 Remington)
- S&W M&P15-22 (US - Semi-Automatic Rifle - .22 Long Rifle)
- S&W M&P15T (US - Semi-Automatic Rifle - 5.56×45mm NATO, .223 Remington)
- Shotguns
- S&W AS (US - Semi-Automatic Shotgun - 12 Gauge, 12 Gauge Fléchette)
- S&W AS-1 (US - Semi-Automatic Shotgun - 12 Gauge, 12 Gauge Fléchette)
- S&W AS-2 (US - Semi-Automatic Shotgun - 12 Gauge, 12 Gauge Fléchette)
- S&W AS-3 (US - Automatic Shotgun - 12 Gauge, 12 Gauge Fléchette)
- Submachine Guns
- S&W Model 76 (US - Submachine Gun - 9×19mm Parabellum: Carl Gustav m/45 Copy)
- Saab Bofors Dynamics
- Personal Defense Weapons
- CBJ-MS (Kingdom of Sweden - Personal Defense Weapon - 6.5×25mm CBJ, 9×19mm Parabellum)
- Sabre Defense
- Rifles
- Sabre Defense A3-M4 Carbine (US - Semi-Automatic Rifle - 6.5×39mm Grendel)
- SAKO
- Rifles
- Rk 95 Tp (Republic of Finland - Assault Rifle - 7.62×39mm: Prototype)
- Sako M90 (Republic of Finland - Assault Rifle - 7.62×39mm: Prototype)
- M92S (Republic of Finland - Assault Rifle - 7.62×39mm)
- M92S Export (Republic of Finland - Assault Rifle - 5.56×45mm NATO)
- Sako M95 (Republic of Finland - Assault Rifle - 7.62×39mm)
- TRG (Republic of Finland - Bolt-Action Sniper Rifle - Various)
- Sako TRG M10 (Republic of Finland - Bolt-Action Sniper Rifle - .300 Winchester Magnum, .308 Winchester, .338 Lapua Magnum)
- Sako TRG-21 (Republic of Finland - Bolt-Action Sniper Rifle - .308 Winchester)
- Sako TRG-22 (Republic of Finland - Bolt-Action Sniper Rifle - .260 Remington, .308 Winchester)
- Sako TRG-41 (Republic of Finland - Bolt-Action Sniper Rifle - .300 Winchester Magnum, .338 Lapua Magnum)
- Sako TRG-42 (Republic of Finland - Bolt-Action Sniper Rifle - .300 Winchester Magnum, .338 Lapua Magnum)
- Scandium Defence
- Scandium F12 (Turkey - Automatic Shotgun - 12 Gauge)
- Škoda Works
- Machine Guns
- Salvator-Dormus M1893 (Austria-Hungary - Heavy Machine Gun - 8×50mmR Mannlicher)
- Armeria San Cristóbal
- Rifles
- San Cristobal carbine (Dominican Republic - Carbine - .30 Carbine)
- San Cristobal Model 3 (Dominican Republic - Battle Rifle - 7.62×51mm NATO)
- Sanna 77 (Republic of Rhodesia - Submachine Gun - 9×19mm Parabellum)
- Saritch 308 (Russian Federation - Semi-Automatic Designated Marksman Rifle - 7.62×51mm NATO: Prototype)
- Savage Arms
- Pistols
- Savage Arms M1907 Pistol (US - Semi-Automatic Pistol - .32 ACP, .45 ACP, .380 ACP)
- Savage Arms M1915 Pistol(US - Semi-Automatic Pistol - .32 ACP, .45 ACP, .380 ACP)
- Savage Arms M1917 Pistol(US - Semi-Automatic Pistol - .32 ACP, .45 ACP, .380 ACP)
- Rifles
- Savage Arms 10FP Tactical (US - Bolt-Action Rifle - .223 Remington)
- Savage Arms 110FP Tactical (US - Bolt-Action Rifle - 7.62×51mm NATO, .30-06 Springfield, .308 Winchester)
- Savage Arms Model 12FVSS (US - Semi-Automatic Pistol - .22-250 Remington)
- Savage Arms Model 93R17 (US - Bolt-Action Rifle - .17 Hornady Magnum Rimfire)
- Schmeisser International GmbH
- Pistols
- PH-45 (Germany, Ukraine - Semi-Automatic Pistol - .45 ACP)
- Schwarzlose MG M.07 (Austria-Hungary - Heavy Machine Gun - 8×50mmR Mannlicher M93, 8×56mmR M30S)
- Schwarzlose MG M.07/12 (Austria-Hungary - Heavy Machine Gun - 8×50mmR Mannlicher M93)
- Schwarzlose MG M.07/31 (Austria-Hungary - Heavy Machine Gun - 8×50mmR Mannlicher M93)
- Schwarzlose MG M.08 (Netherlands, Austria-Hungary - Heavy Machine Gun - 6.5×53mmR Mannlicher)
- Schwarzlose MG M.08/13 (Netherlands - Heavy Machine Gun - 6.5×53mmR Mannlicher)
- Schwarzlose MG M.08/15 (Netherlands - Heavy Machine Gun - 6.5×53mmR Mannlicher)
- Schwarzlose MG-16 (Austria-Hungary - Heavy Machine Gun - 8×50mmR Mannlicher M93)
- Schwarzlose MG-16A (Austria-Hungary - Heavy Machine Gun - 8×50mmR Mannlicher M93)
- Schwarzlose-Janeček vz.07/12/24 (Austria-Hungary - Heavy Machine Gun - 7.92×57mm Mauser)
- Schwarzlose Model 1898 (German Empire - Semi-Automatic Pistol - 7.63×25mm Mauser, 7.65×25mm Borchardt)
- Schwarzlose Model 1908 (German Empire - Semi-Automatic Pistol - .32 ACP)
- SD Scicon Ltd
- Scicon IW (UK - Assault Rifle / Grenade Launcher - 4.7mm caseless / 10mm? grenade: Prototype)
- SCK Kenju (Japan - Submachine Gun - 9×19 Parabellum)
- SCK M-60 (Japan - Submachine Gun - 9×19 Parabellum)
- Sedgley OSS .38 (US - Assassination Device - .38 S&W Special)
- Seecamp (US - Subcompact Semi-Automatic Pistol - .25 ACP, .32 ACP, .380 ACP)
- Semmerling
- Semmerling LM4 (US - pistol, manually operated - .45 ACP)
- Semmerling XLM (US - Semi automatic pistol - .45 ACP)
- Seraphim Armoury
- Pistols
- SAI Model 1911 Archangel (Canada - Semi-Automatic Pistol - .45 ACP, 9×19mm Parabellum)
- SAI Model 1911 Ghost (Canada - Semi-Automatic Pistol - .45 ACP, 9×19mm Parabellum)
- SAI Model 1911 Warfighter (Canada - Semi-Automatic Pistol - .45 ACP, 9×19mm Parabellum)
- SAI Model 1911 Guardian (Canada - Semi-Automatic Pistol - .45 ACP, 9×19mm Parabellum)
- SAI Model 1911 Crusader (Canada - Semi-Automatic Pistol - .45 ACP, 9×19mm Parabellum)
- SAI Model 1911 GI (Canada - Semi-Automatic Pistol - .45 ACP, 9×19mm Parabellum)
- Rifles
- Shotguns
- Serbu Firearms
- Pistols
- Serbu SIRIS (US - Integrally Suppressed Semi-Automatic Pistol - .22 Long Rifle: Licensed production Ruger MK II)
- Submachine guns
- Serbu ROF (US - Submachine gun - 9×19mm Parabellum)
- Rifles
- Serbu BFG-50 (US - Single-Shot Anti-Materiel Rifle - .50 BMG, .510 DTC EUROP)
- Serbu BFG-50A (US - Semi-Automatic Anti-Materiel Rifle - .50 BMG)
- Serbu SIRIS 1022 (US - Integrally Suppressed Semi-Automatic Rifle - .22 Long Rifle: Licensed production Ruger 10/22)
- Shotguns
- Serbu Super-Shorty (US - Compact Pump-Action Shotgun - 12 Gauge, 20 Gauge)
- SG-43 Goryunov (Soviet Union - Medium Machine Gun - 7.62×54mmR)
- SG-43M (Soviet Union - Medium Machine Gun - 7.62×54mmR)
- SG-43MB (Soviet Union - Medium Machine Gun - 7.62×54mmR)
- SG-43MT (Soviet Union - Vehicle-Mounted Medium Machine Gun - 7.62×54mmR)
- SGN-22 (United States - Carbine - .22LR)
- SGN-9 (United States - Carbine - 9x19mm Parabellum)
- Shaher AMR (Islamic Republic of Iran - Bolt-Action Anti-Materiel Rifle - 14.5×114mm)
- Sharps Rifle (US - Single-Shot Rifle - .45-70 Government)
- ShKAS Machine Gun (Soviet Union - Aircraft-Mounted Heavy Machine Gun - 7.62×54mmR)
- ShKAS KM-33 (Soviet Union - Aircraft-Mounted Heavy Machine Gun - 7.62×54mmR)
- ShKAS KM-35(Soviet Union - Aircraft-Mounted Heavy Machine Gun - 7.62×54mmR)
- ShKAS KM-36(Soviet Union - Aircraft-Mounted Heavy Machine Gun - 7.62×54mmR)
- SIG Sauer
  - Machine Guns
- SIG 710-3 (Swiss Confederation - General-Purpose Machine Gun - 7.62×51mm NATO)
- SIG 710-1 (Swiss Confederation - General-Purpose Machine Gun - 6.5×55mm Swedish)
- SIG 710-2 (Swiss Confederation - General-Purpose Machine Gun - 7.92×57mm Mauser)
- Pistols
- SIG P210 (Swiss Confederation - Semi-Automatic Pistol - 7.65×21mm Parabellum, 9×19mm Parabellum, .22 Long Rifle)
- SIG P210 Legend (Swiss Confederation - Semi-Automatic Pistol - 7.65×21mm Parabellum, 9×19mm Parabellum)
- SIG P200 (Swiss Confederation - Double-Barreled Semi-Automatic Pistol - 7.65×21mm Parabellum, 9×19mm Parabellum: Prototype)
- SIG P210-1 (Swiss Confederation - Semi-Automatic Pistol - 7.65×21mm Parabellum, 9×19mm Parabellum)
- SIG M/49 (Swiss Confederation, Kingdom of Denmark - Semi-Automatic Pistol - 7.65×21mm Parabellum, 9×19mm Parabellum)
- SIG P210-2 (Swiss Confederation - Semi-Automatic Pistol - 9×19mm Parabellum)
- SIG M/49 (Swiss Confederation, Kingdom of Denmark - Semi-Automatic Pistol - 7.65×21mm Parabellum, 9×19mm Parabellum)
- SIG P210-4 (Swiss Confederation - Semi-Automatic Pistol - 9×19mm Parabellum)
- SIG P210-3 (Swiss Confederation - Semi-Automatic Pistol - 7.65×21mm Parabellum, 9×19mm Parabellum)
- SIG P210-5 (Swiss Confederation - Semi-Automatic Pistol - 7.65×21mm Parabellum, 9×19mm Parabellum)
- SIG P210-5LS (Swiss Confederation - Semi-Automatic Pistol - 9×19mm Parabellum)
- SIG P210-6 (Swiss Confederation - Semi-Automatic Pistol - 7.65×21mm Parabellum, 9×19mm Parabellum)
- SIG P210-6S (Swiss Confederation - Semi-Automatic Pistol - 9×19mm Parabellum)
- SIG P210-7 (Swiss Confederation - Semi-Automatic Pistol - .22 Long Rifle)
- SIG P210-8 (Swiss Confederation - Semi-Automatic Pistol - 9×19mm Parabellum)
- P220 (Federal Republic of Germany, Swiss Confederation - Semi-Automatic Pistol - 7.65×21mm Parabellum, 9×19mm Parabellum, 10mm Auto, .22 Long Rifle, .38 Super Automatic, .45 ACP)
- P220 Carry (Federal Republic of Germany, Swiss Confederation - Compact Semi-Automatic Pistol - 7.65×21mm Parabellum, 9×19mm Parabellum, 10mm Auto, .22 Long Rifle, .38 Super Automatic, .45 ACP)
- P220 Carry DA/SA (Federal Republic of Germany, Swiss Confederation - Semi-Automatic Pistol - .45 ACP)
- P220 Carry DAK (Federal Republic of Germany, Swiss Confederation - Semi-Automatic Pistol - .45 ACP)
- P220 Carry SAO (Federal Republic of Germany, Swiss Confederation - Semi-Automatic Pistol - .45 ACP)
- P220 Carry SAS (Federal Republic of Germany, Swiss Confederation - Semi-Automatic Pistol - .45 ACP)
- P220 Classic 22 (Federal Republic of Germany, Swiss Confederation - Compact Semi-Automatic Pistol - .22 Long Rifle)
- P220 Combat (Federal Republic of Germany, Swiss Confederation - Semi-Automatic Pistol - .45 ACP)
- P220 Combat TB (Federal Republic of Germany, Swiss Confederation - Semi-Automatic Pistol - .45 ACP)
      - P220 Compact (Federal Republic of Germany, Swiss Confederation - Compact Semi-Automatic Pistol - .45 ACP)
- P220R (Federal Republic of Germany, Swiss Confederation - Semi-Automatic Pistol - .45 ACP)
- P220ST (Federal Republic of Germany, Swiss Confederation - Semi-Automatic Pistol - .45 ACP)
- P220ST Nitron (Federal Republic of Germany, Swiss Confederation - Semi-Automatic Pistol - .45 ACP)
- P225/P6 (Federal Republic of Germany, Swiss Confederation - Compact Semi-Automatic Pistol - 9×19mm Parabellum)
- P245 (Federal Republic of Germany, Swiss Confederation - Compact Semi-Automatic Pistol - .45 ACP)
- P226 (Federal Republic of Germany, Swiss Confederation - Semi-Automatic Pistol - 9×19mm Parabellum, .40 S&W, .357 SIG)
- P226 Blackwater (Federal Republic of Germany, Swiss Confederation - Compact Semi-Automatic Pistol - 9×19mm Parabellum)
- P226 Classic 22 (Federal Republic of Germany, Swiss Confederation - Semi-Automatic Pistol - .22 Long Rifle)
- P226 Combat (Federal Republic of Germany, Swiss Confederation - Semi-Automatic Pistol - 9×19mm Parabellum, .40 S&W, .357 SIG)
- P226 Combat TB (Federal Republic of Germany, Swiss Confederation - Semi-Automatic Pistol - 9×19mm Parabellum, .40 S&W, .357 SIG)
- P226 E2 (Federal Republic of Germany, Swiss Confederation - Compact Semi-Automatic Pistol - 9×19mm Parabellum, .40 S&W, .357 SIG)
- P226 Elite (Federal Republic of Germany, Swiss Confederation - Compact Semi-Automatic Pistol - 9×19mm Parabellum, .40 S&W, .357 SIG)
- P226 Equinox (Federal Republic of Germany, Swiss Confederation - Compact Semi-Automatic Pistol - .40 S&W)
- P226 LDC (Federal Republic of Germany, Swiss Confederation - Compact Semi-Automatic Pistol - 9×19mm Parabellum, .40 S&W, .357 SIG)
- P226 Navy (Federal Republic of Germany, Swiss Confederation - Compact Semi-Automatic Pistol - 9×19mm Parabellum, .40 S&W, .357 SIG)
- P226 SCT (Federal Republic of Germany, Swiss Confederation - Compact Semi-Automatic Pistol - 9×19mm Parabellum, .40 S&W)
- P226 ST (Federal Republic of Germany, Swiss Confederation - Compact Semi-Automatic Pistol - 9×19mm Parabellum, .40 S&W, .357 SIG)
- P226N (Federal Republic of Germany, Swiss Confederation - Semi-Automatic Pistol - 9×19mm Parabellum, .40 S&W, .357 SIG)
- P226R (Federal Republic of Germany, Swiss Confederation - Semi-Automatic Pistol - 9×19mm Parabellum, .40 S&W, .357 SIG)
- P226R HSP (Federal Republic of Germany, Swiss Confederation - Semi-Automatic Pistol - .40 S&W)
- P228/M11 (Federal Republic of Germany, Swiss Confederation - Compact Semi-Automatic Pistol - 9×19mm Parabellum)
- M11A1 (Federal Republic of Germany, Swiss Confederation - Compact Semi-Automatic Pistol - 9×19mm Parabellum)
- M11B (Federal Republic of Germany, Swiss Confederation - Compact Semi-Automatic Pistol - 9×19mm Parabellum)
- P229 (Federal Republic of Germany, Swiss Confederation - Compact Semi-Automatic Pistol - 9×19mm Parabellum, .40 S&W, .357 SIG)
- P224 (Federal Republic of Germany, Swiss Confederation - Subcompact Semi-Automatic Pistol - .40 S&W, .357 SIG)
- P224 DA/SA (Federal Republic of Germany, Swiss Confederation - Subcompact Semi-Automatic Pistol - .40 S&W, .357 SIG)
- P224 Equinox (Federal Republic of Germany, Swiss Confederation - Subcompact Semi-Automatic Pistol - .40 S&W, .357 SIG)
- P224 Extreme (Federal Republic of Germany, Swiss Confederation - Subcompact Semi-Automatic Pistol - .40 S&W, .357 SIG)
- P224 Nickel (Federal Republic of Germany, Swiss Confederation - Subcompact Semi-Automatic Pistol - .40 S&W, .357 SIG)
- P224 SAS (Federal Republic of Germany, Swiss Confederation - Subcompact Semi-Automatic Pistol - .40 S&W, .357 SIG)
- P224 SRT DA/SA (Federal Republic of Germany, Swiss Confederation - Subcompact Semi-Automatic Pistol - .40 S&W, .357 SIG)
- P229 Classic 22 (Federal Republic of Germany, Swiss Confederation - Compact Semi-Automatic Pistol - .22 Long Rifle)
- P229 Elite (Federal Republic of Germany, Swiss Confederation - Compact Semi-Automatic Pistol - 9×19mm Parabellum, .40 S&W, .357 SIG)
- P229 Equinox (Federal Republic of Germany, Swiss Confederation - Compact Semi-Automatic Pistol - 9×19mm Parabellum, .40 S&W, .357 SIG)
- P229 SAS (Federal Republic of Germany, Swiss Confederation - Compact Semi-Automatic Pistol - 9×19mm Parabellum, .40 S&W, .357 SIG)
- P229 SAS GEN 2 (Federal Republic of Germany, Swiss Confederation - Compact Semi-Automatic Pistol - 9×19mm Parabellum, .40 S&W, .357 SIG)
- P229R (Federal Republic of Germany, Swiss Confederation - Compact Semi-Automatic Pistol - 9×19mm Parabellum, .40 S&W, .357 SIG)
- P229R DAK (Federal Republic of Germany, Swiss Confederation - Compact Semi-Automatic Pistol - 9×19mm Parabellum, .40 S&W, .357 SIG)
- P226 X-Series (Federal Republic of Germany, Swiss Confederation - Semi-Automatic Pistol - 9×19mm Parabellum, .40 S&W, .357 SIG)
- P226 X-Five (Federal Republic of Germany, Swiss Confederation - Semi-Automatic Pistol - 9×19mm Parabellum, .40 S&W, .357 SIG)
- P226 X-Five Allround (Federal Republic of Germany, Swiss Confederation - Semi-Automatic Pistol - 9×19mm Parabellum, .40 S&W, .357 SIG)
- P226 X-Five Competition (Federal Republic of Germany, Swiss Confederation - Semi-Automatic Pistol - 9×19mm Parabellum, .40 S&W, .357 SIG)
- P226 X-Five Level-1 (Federal Republic of Germany, Swiss Confederation - Semi-Automatic Pistol - 9×19mm Parabellum, .40 S&W, .357 SIG)
- P226 X-Five Lightweight (Federal Republic of Germany, Swiss Confederation - Semi-Automatic Pistol - 9×19mm Parabellum, .40 S&W, .357 SIG)
- P226 X-Five Norway (Federal Republic of Germany, Swiss Confederation - Semi-Automatic Pistol - 9×19mm Parabellum, .40 S&W, .357 SIG)
- P226 X-Five Tactical (Federal Republic of Germany, Swiss Confederation - Semi-Automatic Pistol - 9×19mm Parabellum, .40 S&W, .357 SIG)
- P226 X-Short (Federal Republic of Germany, Swiss Confederation - Semi-Automatic Pistol - 9×19mm Parabellum, .40 S&W, .357 SIG)
- P226 X-Six (Federal Republic of Germany, Swiss Confederation - Semi-Automatic Pistol - 9×19mm Parabellum, .40 S&W, .357 SIG)
- P226 X-Six AL (Federal Republic of Germany, Swiss Confederation - Semi-Automatic Pistol - 9×19mm Parabellum, .40 S&W, .357 SIG)
- P239 (Federal Republic of Germany, Swiss Confederation - Compact Semi-Automatic Pistol - 9×19mm Parabellum, .40 S&W, .357 SIG)
- P239 DA/SA (Federal Republic of Germany, Swiss Confederation - Compact Semi-Automatic Pistol - 9×19mm Parabellum, .40 S&W, .357 SIG)
- P239 DAK (Federal Republic of Germany, Swiss Confederation - Compact Semi-Automatic Pistol - 9×19mm Parabellum, .40 S&W, .357 SIG)
- P239 DAO (Federal Republic of Germany, Swiss Confederation - Compact Semi-Automatic Pistol - 9×19mm Parabellum, .40 S&W, .357 SIG)
- P239 Tactical (Federal Republic of Germany, Swiss Confederation - Compact Semi-Automatic Pistol - 9×19mm Parabellum, .40 S&W, .357 SIG)
- P239 SAS (Federal Republic of Germany, Swiss Confederation - Compact Semi-Automatic Pistol - 9×19mm Parabellum, .40 S&W, .357 SIG)
- P239 SAS GEN 2 (Federal Republic of Germany, Swiss Confederation - Compact Semi-Automatic Pistol - 9×19mm Parabellum, .40 S&W, .357 SIG)
- P239G (Federal Republic of Germany, Swiss Confederation - Compact Semi-Automatic Pistol - 9×19mm Parabellum, .40 S&W, .357 SIG)
- P230 (Federal Republic of Germany, Swiss Confederation - Compact Semi-Automatic Pistol - 9×18mm Ultra, .32 ACP, .380 ACP)
- P230-JP (Federal Republic of Germany, Swiss Confederation - Compact Semi-Automatic Pistol - 9×18mm Ultra, .32 ACP, .380 ACP)
- P232 (Federal Republic of Germany, Swiss Confederation - Compact Semi-Automatic Pistol - 9×18mm Ultra, .32 ACP, .380 ACP)
- SIG Pro (Swiss Confederation - Semi-Automatic Pistol - 9×19mm Parabellum)
- SP 2009 (Swiss Confederation - Semi-Automatic Pistol - 9×19mm Parabellum)
- SP 2009-9-BMS (Swiss Confederation - Semi-Automatic Pistol - 9×19mm Parabellum)
- SP 2022 (Swiss Confederation - Semi-Automatic Pistol - 9×19mm Parabellum & .40 S&W: Picatinny Rail)
- SPC 2022 (Swiss Confederation - Semi-Automatic Pistol - 9×19mm Parabellum & .40 S&W: Picatinny Rail)
- SP 2340 (Swiss Confederation - Semi-Automatic Pistol - .357 SIG & .40 S&W)
- Rifles
- SIG SG 510 (Swiss Confederation - Battle Rifle - 7.62×51mm NATO)
- SIG SG510-1 (Swiss Confederation - Battle Rifle - 7.62×51mm NATO)
- SIG SG510-2 (Swiss Confederation - Battle Rifle - 7.62×55mm Swiss GP 11)
- SIG SG510-3 (Swiss Confederation - Assault Rifle - 7.62×39mm)
- SIG SG510-4 (Swiss Confederation - Battle Rifle - 7.62×51mm NATO)
- SIG AMT (Swiss Confederation - Semi-Automatic Rifle - 7.62×55mm Swiss GP 11, .308 Winchester)
- SIG PE 57 (Swiss Confederation - Semi-Automatic Rifle - 7.62×55mm Swiss GP 11)
- SIG SG 530 (Swiss Confederation - Assault Rifle - 5.56×45mm NATO)
- SIG SG 540 (Swiss Confederation - Assault Rifle - 5.56×45mm NATO)
- SG SG 541 (Swiss Confederation - Assault Rifle - 5.56×45mm NATO: Prototype)
- SIG SG 542 (Swiss Confederation - Battle Rifle - 7.62×51mm NATO)
- SIG SG 543 (Swiss Confederation - Carbine - 5.56×45mm NATO)
- SIG SG 550 (Swiss Confederation - Semi Auto Rifle - 5.56×45mm NATO)
- SIG PE 90 (Swiss Confederation, Canada - Semi-Automatic Rifle - 5.56×45mm NATO)
- SIG SG 550 Sniper(Swiss Confederation - Semi-Automatic Designated Marksman Rifle - 5.56×45mm NATO)
- SIG SG 550 SP (Swiss Confederation - Semi-Automatic Rifle - 5.56×45mm NATO)
- SIG SG 551 (Swiss Confederation - Carbine - 5.56×45mm NATO)
- SIG SG 551 LB (Swiss Confederation - Carbine - 5.56×45mm NATO)
- SIG SG 551 SP (Swiss Confederation - Semi-Automatic Carbine - 5.56×45mm NATO)
- SIG SG 551 SWAT (Swiss Confederation - Carbine - 5.56×45mm NATO)
- SIG SG 551-1P (Swiss Confederation - Carbine - 5.56×45mm NATO)
- SIG SG 552 Commando (Swiss Confederation - Compact Assault Rifle - 5.56×45mm NATO)
- SIG SG 552 LB (Swiss Confederation - Compact Assault Rifle - 5.56×45mm NATO)
- SIG SG 552 SP (Swiss Confederation - Compact Semi-Automatic Rifle - 5.56×45mm NATO)
- SIG SG 553 (Swiss Confederation - Compact Assault Rifle - 5.56×45mm NATO)
- SIG SG 553 LB (Swiss Confederation - Compact Assault Rifle - 5.56×45mm NATO)
- SIG SG 553 R (Swiss Confederation - Compact Assault Rifle - 7.62×39mm)
- SIG SG 553 SB (Swiss Confederation - Compact Assault Rifle - 5.56×45mm NATO)
- SIG SG 553 SOW (Swiss Confederation - Compact Assault Rifle - 5.56×45mm NATO)
- SIG 522 (Federal Republic of Germany, Swiss Confederation - Semi-Automatic Rifle - .22 Long Rifle)
- SIG 522 Classic (Federal Republic of Germany - Semi-Automatic Rifle - .22 Long Rifle)
- SIG 522 Commando (Federal Republic of Germany - Semi-Automatic Carbine - .22 Long Rifle)
- SIG 522 SWAT (Federal Republic of Germany - Semi-Automatic Rifle - .22 Long Rifle)
- SIG 522 SWAT Commando (Federal Republic of Germany - Semi-Automatic Carbine - .22 Long Rifle)
- SIG 522 Target (Federal Republic of Germany - Semi-Automatic Rifle - .22 Long Rifle)
- SIG556 (Swiss Confederation - Semi-Automatic Rifle - 5.56×45mm NATO)
- SIG556 Classic (Swiss Confederation - Semi-Automatic Rifle - 5.56×45mm NATO)
- SIG556 DMR (Swiss Confederation - Semi-Automatic Designated Marksman Rifle - 5.56×45mm NATO)
- SIG556 SWAT (Swiss Confederation - Semi-Automatic Rifle - 5.56×45mm NATO)
- SIG556R (Swiss Confederation - Semi-Automatic Rifle - 7.62×39mm)
- SIGP556 (Swiss Confederation - Subcompact Semi-Automatic Rifle - 5.56×45mm NATO)
- SIG Sport (Swiss Confederation - Semi-Automatic Rifle - 5.56×45mm NATO)
- SSG 2000 (Federal Republic of Germany, Swiss Confederation - Bolt-Action Sniper Rifle - 7.62×51mm NATO)
- SSG 3000 (Federal Republic of Germany, Swiss Confederation - Bolt-Action Sniper Rifle - 7.62×51mm NATO)
- Submachine Guns
- SIG MP310 (Swiss Confederation - Submachine Gun - 9×19mm Parabellum)
- SIG MPX (Swiss Confederation - Submachine Gun - 9×19mm Parabellum)
- Silin gun (Soviet Union - Medium Machine Gun - 7.62×54mmR)
- Sima Electronica
- Rifles
- FAD Assault Rifle (Republic of Peru - Assault Rifle with Grenade Launcher - 5.56×45mm NATO, 40×46mm SR Grenade: In Development)
- FAD Carbine (Republic of Peru - Carbine with Grenade Launcher - 5.56×45mm NATO, 40×46mm SR Grenade)
- FAD Light Machine Gun (Republic of Peru - Squad Automatic Weapon with Grenade Launcher - 5.56×45mm NATO, 40×46mm SR Grenade)
      - FAD Sniper (Republic of Peru - Designated Marksman Rifle with Grenade Launcher - 5.56×45mm NATO, 40×46mm SR Grenade)
  - Submachine Guns
- SIMA-CEFAR MGP-15 (Republic of Peru - Submachine Gun - 9×19mm Parabellum)
- SIMA-CEFAR MGP-14 (Republic of Peru - Semi-Automatic Carbine - 9×19mm Parabellum)
- SIMA-CEFAR MGP-84 (Republic of Peru - Submachine Gun - 9×19mm Parabellum)
- SIMA-CEFAR MGP-79 (Republic of Peru - Submachine Gun - 9×19mm Parabellum)
- SIMA-CEFAR MGP-79 A (Republic of Peru - Submachine Gun - 9×19mm Parabellum)
- SIMA-CEFAR MGP-87 (Republic of Peru - Submachine Gun - 9×19mm Parabellum)
- Sjögren shotgun (Kingdom of Denmark - Semi-Automatic Shotgun - 12 Gauge)
- Škoda Works
- Machine Guns
- Skoda M1893 (Austria-Hungary - Heavy Machine Gun - 8×50mmR Mannlicher)
- Skoda M1909 (Austria-Hungary - Medium Machine Gun - 8×50mmR Mannlicher)
- SLEM-1 (UK - Semi-Automatic Rifle - 7.92×57mm Mauser)
- Slostin Machine Gun (Soviet Union - Gatling-Type Heavy Machine Gun - 7.62×54mmR, 14.5×114mm: Prototype)
- SLR-15 (US - Semi-Automatic Rifle - 5.56×45mm NATO)
- SKS (Soviet Union - Semi-Automatic Carbine - 7.62×39mm)
- SKS Honor Guard (Soviet Union - Semi-Automatic Carbine - 7.62×39mm)
- OP-SKS (Soviet Union - Semi-Automatic Carbine - 7.62×39mm)
- SM-9 (Republic of Guatemala - Machine Pistol - 9×19mm Parabellum)
- Small Arms Limited
- SAL model 2 (Canada - submachine gun - 9×19mm Parabellum)
- Smith Carbine (US - Breech-Loading Carbine - .50 Smith)
- Savin Narov Machine Gun (Soviet Union - Medium Machine Gun - 7.62×54mmR)
- Società Italiana Tecnologie Speciali S.p.A.
- Pistols
- Resolver Pistol(Italian Republic - Compact Semi-Automatic Pistol)
- Resolver M9 (Italian Republic - Compact Semi-Automatic Pistol - 9×19mm Parabellum)
- Resolver M380 (Italian Republic - Compact Semi-Automatic Pistol - .380 ACP)
- Submachine Guns
- Spectre M4 (Italian Republic - Submachine Gun - 9×19mm Parabellum)
- Società Costruzioni Industriali Milano
- Rifles
- SOCIMI AR-831 (Italian Republic - Assault Rifle - 5.56×45mm NATO)
- SOCIMI AR-832/FS (Italian Republic - Assault Rifle - 5.56×45mm NATO)
- SOCIMI AR-871 (Italian Republic - Assault Rifle - 5.56×45mm NATO)
  - Submachine Guns
- SOCIMI SMG 821 (Italian Republic - Submachine Gun - 9×19mm Parabellum)
- Sokolovsky Automaster (US - Semi-Automatic Pistol - .45 ACP)
- Solothurn
- Pistols
- AT84-S (Swiss Confederation - Semi-Automatic Pistol - 9×19mm Parabellum: CZ-75 Clone)
- Rifles
- Solothurn S-18/100 (Nazi Germany, Swiss Confederation - Semi-Automatic Anti-Materiel Rifle - 20×105mmB)
- Solothurn S-18/1000 (Nazi Germany, Swiss Confederation - Semi-Automatic Anti-Materiel Rifle - 20×138mmB)
- Solothurn S-18/1100 (Nazi Germany, Swiss Confederation - Automatic Anti-Materiel Rifle - 20×138mmB)
- Spasov M1936 (Bulgaria - Light Machine Gun - 7.62×54mmR / 7.92×57mm)
- Spasov M1939 (Bulgaria - Submachine Gun - 9×19mm Parabellum)
- Spasov M1944 (Bulgaria - Submachine Gun - 9×19mm Parabellum)
- Spasov M1944 Trigun (Bulgaria - Submachine Gun - 9×19mm Parabellum)
- SPHINX S2000 (Swiss Confederation - Semi-Automatic Pistol - 9×19mm Parabellum)
- SPHINX S3000 (Swiss Confederation - Semi-Automatic Pistol - 9×19mm Parabellum)
- SPP-1 Underwater Pistol (Soviet Union - Semi-Automatic Underwater Pistol - 4.5×40mmR)
- Springfield Armory (US Military provider 1777–1968)
- Launchers
- M75 (US - Automatic Grenade Launcher - 40×53mm Grenade)
- M129 (US - Automatic Grenade Launcher - 40×46mm SR Grenade, 40×53mm Grenade)
- M79 (US - Single-Shot Grenade Launcher - 40×46mm SR Grenade)
- Springfield M1911A1 (US - Semi-Automatic Pistol - 9×19mm Parabellum, .45 ACP)
- Rifles
- Springfield Model 1866 (US - Single-Shot Breech-Loading Rifle - .50-70 Government)
- Springfield Model 1873 (US - Single-Shot Breech-Loading Rifle - .45-70 Government)
- Springfield Model 1879 (US - Single-Shot Breech-Loading Rifle - .45-70 Government)
- Springfield Model 1879 Carbine (US - Single-Shot Breech-Loading Carbine - .45-70 Government)
- Springfield Model 1880 (US - Single-Shot Rifle Breech-Loading - .45-70 Government)
- Springfield Model 1884 (US - Single-Shot Rifle Breech-Loading - .45-70 Government)
- Springfield Model 1884 Carbine (US - Single-Shot Breech-Loading Carbine - .45-70 Government)
- Springfield Model 1888 (US - Single-Shot Breech-Loading Rifle - .45-70 Government)
- Springfield Model 1889 (US - Single-Shot Breech-Loading Rifle - .45-70 Government)
- Springfield Model 1903 (US - Bolt-Action Rifle - .30-06 Springfield)
- Springfield Model 1903 Air Service (US - Bolt-Action Rifle - .30-06 Springfield)
- Springfield Model 1903 Bullpup (US - Bolt-Action Rifle - .30-06 Springfield: Prototype)
- Springfield Model 1903 Bushmaster Carbine (US - Bolt-Action Carbine - .30-06 Springfield)
- Springfield Model 1903 Mark I (US - Bolt-Action Rifle - .30-06 Springfield)
- Springfield Model 1903 NM (US - Bolt-Action Rifle - .30-06 Springfield)
- Springfield Model 1903 NRA (US - Bolt-Action Rifle - .30-06 Springfield)
- Springfield Model 1903 Scant Stock (US - Bolt-Action Rifle - .30-06 Springfield)
- Springfield Model 1903A1 (US - Bolt-Action Rifle - .30-06 Springfield)
- Springfield Model 1903A2 (US - Bolt-Action Sub-Caliber Training Rifle - .30-06 Springfield)
- Springfield Model 1903A3 (US - Bolt-Action Rifle - .30-06 Springfield)
- Springfield Model 1903A4 (US - Bolt-Action Sniper Rifle - .30-06 Springfield)
- Springfield SALVO (US - Assault Rifle - 5.56×45mm NATO)
- Springfield SAR 48 (Federative Republic of Brazil, US - Semi-Automatic Rifle - 7.62×51mm NATO)
- Springfield SAR-48HB (Federative Republic of Brazil, US - Semi-Automatic Rifle - 7.62×51mm NATO)
- Springfield SAR4800 (Federative Republic of Brazil, US - Semi-Automatic Rifle - 7.62×51mm NATO)
- Springfield SAR-8 (Hellenic Republic, US - Semi-Automatic Rifle - 7.62×51mm NATO)
- Springfield SAR-8 HBCS (Hellenic Republic, US - Semi-Automatic Rifle - 7.62×51mm NATO)
- Springfield SPIW (US - Assault Rifle with Grenade Launcher - 5.56×45mm SCF Fléchette, 40×46mm SR Grenade: Prototype)
- Springfield UMG (US - Machine Gun - 5.56×45mm SCF Fléchette)
- Springfield Armory, Inc. (contemporary importer and manufacturer)
- Pistols
- Springfield Armory 911 (US – Subcompact Semi-Automatic Pistol – .380 ACP, 9×19mm Parabellum)
- Springfield Armory EMP (US – Subcompact Semi-Automatic Pistol – 9×19mm Parabellum, .40 S&W)
- Springfield Armory Hellcat (Croatia – Micro-compact Semi-Automatic Pistol – 9×19mm Parabellum)
- Springfield Armory XD (Croatia – Semi-Automatic Pistol series – multiple calibers)
- includes XD-M, XD-S, XD-E variants
- Rifles
- Springfield Armory BM59 (US - Semi-Automatic Rifle - 7.62×51mm NATO)
- Springfield Armory M1A (US – Semi-Automatic Rifle – 7.62×51mm NATO, .308 Winchester, 6.5mm Creedmoor)
- Springfield Armory M6 Scout (US – combination gun – .22 Hornet over .410 bore)
- Springfield Armory SAINT (US – Semi-Automatic Rifle – 5.56×45mm NATO, .308 Winchester, .300 AAC Blackout)
- SRM Arms
- Shotguns
- SRM Arms Model 1216 (US - Semi-Automatic Shotgun - 12 Gauge)
- SRM Arms Model 1208 (US - Shortened Semi-Automatic Shotgun - 12 Gauge)
- SRM Arms Model 1212 (US - Compact Semi-Automatic Shotgun - 12 Gauge)
- Star Bonifacio Echeverria, S.A
- Pistols
- JO.LO.AR. (Kingdom of Spain - Semi-Automatic Pistol - 9×23mm Largo, .25 ACP, .32 ACP, .45 ACP, .380 ACP)
- Star M30 (Kingdom of Spain - Semi-Automatic Pistol - 9×19mm Parabellum)
- Star M31 (Kingdom of Spain - Semi-Automatic Pistol - 9×19mm Parabellum)
- Star Megastar (Kingdom of Spain - Semi-Automatic Pistol - 10mm Auto, .45 ACP)
- Star Military Model 1 (Kingdom of Spain - Semi-Automatic Pistol - 9×19mm Parabellum)
- Star Model 1920 Military (Kingdom of Spain - Semi-Automatic Pistol - 9×23mm Largo)
- Star Model 1922 (Kingdom of Spain - Semi-Automatic Pistol - 9×23mm Largo)
- Star Model A (Kingdom of Spain - Semi-Automatic Pistol - 9×23mm Largo)
- Star Model B (Kingdom of Spain - Semi-Automatic Pistol - 9×19mm Parabellum)
- Star Model B Super (Kingdom of Spain - Semi-Automatic Pistol - 9×19mm Parabellum)
- Star Model BM (Nationalist Spain - Semi-Automatic Pistol - 9×19mm Parabellum)
- Star Model BKM (Nationalist Spain - Semi-Automatic Pistol - 9×19mm Parabellum)
- Star Model BKS (Nationalist Spain - Semi-Automatic Pistol - 9×19mm Parabellum)
- Star Model M (Kingdom of Spain - Semi-Automatic Pistol - 9×23mm Largo)
- Star Model MD (Kingdom of Spain - Semi-Automatic Pistol - 9×23mm Largo)
- Star Model DKL (Kingdom of Spain - Compact Semi-Automatic Pistol - 9×23mm Largo)
- Star Model F (Kingdom of Spain - Semi-Automatic Pistol - .22 Long Rifle)
- Star Model PD (Kingdom of Spain - Compact Semi-Automatic Pistol - .45 ACP)
- Star Model S (Kingdom of Spain - Semi-Automatic Pistol - .380 ACP)
- Star Model Z84 (Kingdom of Spain - 1985 - Machine Pistol - 9×19mm Parabellum: Machine Pistol used by the UEBC combat diver group of the Royal Spanish Navy.)
- Star Starlite (Kingdom of Spain - Subcompact Semi-Automatic Pistol - .25 ACP)
- Star Ultrastar (Kingdom of Spain - Compact Semi-Automatic Pistol - 9×19mm Parabellum)
- Submachine Guns
- Star Si35 (Second Spanish Republic - Submachine Gun - 9×23mm Largo)
- Star Model Z62 (Nationalist Spain - Submachine Gun - 9×19mm Parabellum)
- Starr Arms Company
- Revolvers
- Starr DA (US - Double-Action Revolver - .44 Percussion)
- Starr DA Navy (US - Double-Action Revolver - .36 Percussion)
- Stemple 76/45(US - Submachine Gun - .45 ACP: S&W Model 76 Clone)
- Sterling Armaments Company
- Rifles
- Sterling SAR-87(UK - Assault Rifle - 5.56×45mm NATO)
- Submachine Guns
- Lanchester Mk 1 (UK - Submachine Gun - 9×19mm Parabellum)
- Sterling Revolver (UK - Double-Action Revolver - .357 Magnum)
- Sterling Submachine Gun(UK - Submachine Gun - 9×19mm Parabellum)
- Sterling MK7A4 Paratroopers Pistol (UK - Semi-Automatic Pistol - 9×19mm Parabellum)
- Sterling 7.62 (UK - Squad Automatic Weapon - 7.62×51mm NATO)
- Steyr Mannlicher
- Pistols
- Steyr GB (Republic of Austria - Semi-Automatic Pistol - 9×19mm Parabellum)
- Steyr M Series (Republic of Austria - Semi-Automatic Pistols)
- Steyr M-A1 Series (Republic of Austria - Semi-Automatic Pistols)
- Steyr M9-A1 (Republic of Austria - Semi-Automatic Pistol - 9×19mm Parabellum, 9×21mm IMI)
- Steyr M40-A1(Republic of Austria - Semi-Automatic Pistol - .40 S&W)
- Steyr M357-A1(Republic of Austria - Semi-Automatic Pistol - .357 SIG)
- Steyr M9 (Republic of Austria - Semi-Automatic Pistol - 9×19mm Parabellum, 9×21mm IMI)
- Steyr M40 (Republic of Austria - Semi-Automatic Pistol - .40 S&W)
- Steyr M357 (Republic of Austria - Semi-Automatic Pistol - .357 SIG)
- Steyr S Series (Republic of Austria - Subcompact Semi-Automatic Pistols)
- Steyr S9 (Republic of Austria - Subcompact Semi-Automatic Pistol - 9×19mm Parabellum, 9×21mm IMI)
- Steyr S40 (Republic of Austria - Subcompact Semi-Automatic Pistol - .40 S&W)
- Steyr S-A1 Series (Republic of Austria - Subcompact Semi-Automatic Pistols)
- Steyr S9-A1 (Republic of Austria - Subcompact Semi-Automatic Pistol - 9×19mm Parabellum, 9×21mm IMI)
- Steyr S40-A1 (Republic of Austria - Subcompact Semi-Automatic Pistol - .40 S&W)
- Steyr Mannlicher M1894 (Austria-Hungary - Semi-Automatic Pistol - 7.65×21mm Mannlicher)
- Steyr Mannlicher M1901 (Austria-Hungary - Semi-Automatic Pistol - 7.65×21mm Mannlicher)
- Rifles
- AUG (Republic of Austria - Assault Rifle - 5.56×45mm NATO)
- AUG A0 (Republic of Austria - Assault Rifle - 5.56×45mm NATO)
- AUG A1 (Republic of Austria - Assault Rifle - 5.56×45mm NATO)
- AUG P (Republic of Austria - Semi-Automatic Carbine - 5.56×45mm NATO)
- AUG P Special Receiver (Republic of Austria - Semi-Automatic Carbine - 5.56×45mm NATO)
- AUG SA (Republic of Austria - Semi-Automatic Rifle - 5.56×45mm NATO)
- AUG A2 (Republic of Austria - Assault Rifle - 5.56×45mm NATO)
- AUG A3 SF (Republic of Austria - Assault Rifle - 5.56×45mm NATO)
- AUG USR (Republic of Austria - Semi-Automatic Rifle - 5.56×45mm NATO)
- AUG A3 (Republic of Austria - Assault Rifle - 5.56×45mm NATO)
- AUG A3 Para (Republic of Austria - Submachine Gun - 9×19mm Parabellum)
- AUG A3 M1 (Republic of Austria - Semi-Automatic Carbine - 5.56×45mm NATO)
- AUG A3 SA NATO (Republic of Austria - Semi-Automatic Carbine - 5.56×45mm NATO)
- AUG A3 SA USA (Republic of Austria - Semi-Automatic Carbine - 5.56×45mm NATO)
- Steyr AUG HBAR (Republic of Austria - Squad Automatic Weapon - 5.56×45mm NATO)
- AUG HBAR-T (Republic of Austria - Designated Marksman Rifle/Squad Automatic Weapon - 5.56×45mm NATO)
- AUG LMG (Republic of Austria - Assault Rifle - 5.56×45mm NATO)
- AUG LMG-T (Republic of Austria - Assault Rifle - 5.56×45mm NATO)
- AUG LSW (Republic of Austria - Squad Automatic Weapon - 5.56×45mm NATO)
- AUG M203 (Republic of Austria - Assault Rifle with Grenade Launcher - 5.56×45mm NATO)
- AUG Para (Republic of Austria - Submachine Gun - 9×19mm Parabellum)
- AUG Z (Republic of Austria - Semi-Automatic Rifle - 5.56×45mm NATO)
- IWS 2000 (Republic of Austria - Semi-Automatic Anti-Materiel Rifle - 15.2×169mm)
- AMR 5075 (Republic of Austria - Semi-Automatic Anti-Materiel Rifle - 14.5×114mm)
- Mannlicher M1886 (Austria-Hungary - Bolt-Action Rifle - 11×58mmR)
- Mannlicher M1886 Carbine (Austria-Hungary - Bolt-Action Carbine - 11×58mmR)
- Mannlicher M1886-88 (Austria-Hungary - Bolt-Action Rifle - 8×52mmR)
- Mannlicher M1888 (Austria-Hungary - Bolt-Action Rifle - 8×50mmR Mannlciher, 8×56mmR)
- Mannlicher M1888/24 (Austria-Hungary - Bolt-Action Rifle - 8×57mm IS)
- Mannlicher M1888/90 (Austria-Hungary - Bolt-Action Rifle - 8×52mmR)
- Mannlicher M1888/95 (Austria-Hungary - Bolt-Action Rifle - 8×50mmR Mannlicher)
- Mannlicher M1890 (Austria-Hungary - Straight-Pull Bolt-Action Rifle - 8×50mmR Mannlicher, 8×52mmR)
- Mannlicher M1890/24 (Austria-Hungary - Straight-Pull Bolt-Action Carbine - 8×57mm IS)
- Mannlicher M1890/30 (Austria-Hungary - Straight-Pull Bolt-Action Carbine - 8×56mmR)
- Mannlicher M1890 Cavalry Carbine (Austria-Hungary - Straight-Pull Bolt-Action Carbine - 8×50mmR Mannlicher, 8×52mmR)
- Mannlicher M1890 Gendarmerie Carbine (Austria-Hungary - Straight-Pull Bolt-Action Carbine - 8×50mmR Mannlicher, 8×52mmR)
- Mannlicher M1890 Navy Short Rifle (Austria-Hungary - Straight-Pull Bolt-Action Carbine - 8×50mmR Mannlicher, 8×52mmR)
- Mannlicher M1895 (Austria-Hungary - Bolt-Action Rifle - 8×52mmR)
- Mannlicher M1895 Carbine (Austria-Hungary - Bolt-Action Carbine - 8×50mmR Mannlicher)
- Mannlicher M1895 Infantry Rifle (Austria-Hungary - Bolt-Action Rifle - 8×50mmR Mannlicher)
- Mannlicher M1895 Short Rifle (Austria-Hungary - Bolt-Action Carbine - 8×50mmR Mannlicher)
- Mannlicher M1895/24 (Austria-Hungary - Bolt-Action Rifle - 8×57mm IS)
- Mannlicher M1895/30 (Austria-Hungary - Bolt-Action Rifle - 8×56mmR)
- Mannlicher M1895/31 (Austria-Hungary - Bolt-Action Rifle - 8×56mmR)
- Mannlicher M1895M (Austria-Hungary - Bolt-Action Rifle - 8×57mm IS)
- Mannlicher–Schönauer (Austria-Hungary - Bolt-Action Rifle - 6.5×54mm Mannlicher–Schönauer)
- Mannlicher–Schönauer M1903/14 (Austria-Hungary - Bolt-Action Rifle - 6.5×54mm Mannlicher–Schönauer)
- Mannlicher–Schönauer M1903/14/30 (Austria-Hungary - Bolt-Action Carbine - 6.5×54mm Mannlicher–Schönauer)
- Mannlicher–Schönauer M1905 (Austria-Hungary - Bolt-Action Rifle - 9×56mm Mannlicher–Schönauer)
- Mannlicher–Schönauer M1908 (Austria-Hungary - Bolt-Action Rifle - 8×56mm Mannlicher–Schönauer)
- Mannlicher–Schönauer M1910 (Austria-Hungary - Bolt-Action Rifle - 9×57mm Mannlicher–Schönauer)
- Mannlicher–Schönauer Model 72 (Austria-Hungary - Bolt-Action Rifle - .243 Winchester, .270 Winchester, .30-06 Springfield)
- Steyr ACR (Republic of Austria - Assault Rifle - 5.56×45mm SCF Fléchette: Prototype)
- SSG-69 (Republic of Austria - Bolt-Action Sniper Rifle - 7.62×51mm NATO, .243 Winchester)
- SSG-69 PI (Republic of Austria - Bolt-Action Sniper Rifle - 7.62×51mm NATO, .243 Winchester)
- SSG-69 PII (Republic of Austria - Bolt-Action Sniper Rifle - 7.62×51mm NATO, .22-250 Remington, .243 Winchester)
- SSG-69 PIIK (Republic of Austria - Bolt-Action Sniper Rifle - 7.62×51mm NATO, .22-250 Remington, .243 Winchester)
- SSG-69 PIV (Republic of Austria - Bolt-Action Sniper Rifle - 7.62×51mm NATO, .243 Winchester)
- Steyr Scout (Republic of Austria - Bolt Action Rifle - 5.56×45mm NATO, 7mm-08 Remington, 7.62×51mm NATO, .223 Remington, .243 Winchester, .308 Winchester, .376 Steyr)
- Scout Elite (Republic of Austria - Bolt Action Rifle - 5.56×45mm NATO, 7mm-08 Remington, 7.62×51mm NATO)
- Submachine Guns
- Steyr MPi 69 (Republic of Austria - Submachine Gun - 9×19mm Parabellum)
- Steyr MPi 81 (Republic of Austria - Submachine Gun - 9×19mm Parabellum)
- Steyr TMP (Republic of Austria - Submachine Gun - 9×19mm Parabellum)
- Steyr SPP (Republic of Austria - Semi-Automatic Pistol - 9×19mm Parabellum)
- Roth–Steyr M1907 (Austria-Hungary - Semi-Automatic Pistol - 8mm Roth–Steyr)
- Steyr-Mannlicher Precision Rifle SR100 (Republic of Austria - Bolt-Action Sniper Rifle - 7.62×51mm NATO, .300 Winchester Magnum, .308 Winchester, .338 Lapua Magnum)
- Steyr-Solothurn S1-100 (First Republic of Austria - Submachine Gun - 9×19mm Parabellum: MP 34 Variant)
- StG 44 (Nazi Germany - Assault Rifle - 7.92×33mm Kurz)
- Pistols
- STI Eagle (US - Semi-Automatic Pistol - 9×19mm, .40 S&W, .45 ACP)
- ST Kinetics
- Chartered Industries Singapore
- Launchers
- ST Kinetics 40 GL(Republic of Singapore - Underslung Single-Shot Grenade Launcher - 40×46mm Grenade)
- Machine Guns
- CIS 50MG (Republic of Singapore - Heavy Machine Gun - .50 BMG)
- Ultimax 100(Republic of Singapore - Squad Automatic Weapon - 5.56×45mm NATO)
- Ultimax Mark 1(Republic of Singapore - Squad Automatic Weapon - 5.56×45mm NATO)
- Ultimax Mark 2(Republic of Singapore - Squad Automatic Weapon - 5.56×45mm NATO)
- Ultimax Mark 3/3A (Republic of Singapore - Squad Automatic Weapon - 5.56×45mm NATO)
- Ultimax Mark 4 (Republic of Singapore - Squad Automatic Weapon - 5.56×45mm NATO)
- Ultimax Mark 5 (Republic of Singapore - Squad Automatic Weapon - 5.56×45mm NATO)
- Personal Defense Weapons
- CPW (Republic of Singapore - Personal Defense Weapon - HK 4.6×30mm, FN 5.7×28mm, 9×19mm Parabellum)
- ST Kinetics SSW (Republic of Singapore - Semi-Automatic Personal Defense Weapon with Automatic Grenade Launcher - HK 4.6×30mm, FN 5.7×28mm / 40×46mm SR Grenade: In Development)
- Rifles
- SAR-21 (Republic of Singapore - Assault Rifle - 5.56×45mm NATO)
- SAR-21 GL (Republic of Singapore - Assault Rifle with Grenade Launcher - 5.56×45mm NATO / 40×46mm Grenade)
- SAR-21 with CIS GL 40(Republic of Singapore - Assault Rifle with Grenade Launcher - 5.56×45mm NATO / 40×46mm Grenade)
- SAR-21 GL with M203 (Republic of Singapore - Assault Rifle with Grenade Launcher - 5.56×45mm NATO / 40×46mm SR Grenade)
- SAR-21 Lightweight Carbine (Republic of Singapore - Carbine - 5.56×45mm NATO)
- SAR-21 LMG (Republic of Singapore - Squad Automatic Weapon - 5.56×45mm NATO)
- SAR-21 MMS (Republic of Singapore - Assault Rifle - 5.56×45mm NATO)
- SAR-21 MMS Tactical (Republic of Singapore - Assault Rifle - 5.56×45mm NATO)
- SAR-21 P-Rail (Republic of Singapore - Assault Rifle - 5.56×45mm NATO)
- SAR-21 RCF (Republic of Singapore - Assault Rifle - 5.56×45mm NATO)
- SAR-21 Sharpshooter (Republic of Singapore - Assault Rifle - 5.56×45mm NATO)
- SAR-21A (Republic of Singapore - Assault Rifle - 5.56×45mm NATO)
- SAR-80 (Republic of Singapore - Assault Rifle - 5.56×45mm NATO)
- SAR-87 (Republic of Singapore, UK - Assault Rifle - 5.56×45mm NATO)
- Stoeger Industries
- Shotguns
- Stoeger Coach Gun (Federative Republic of Brazil - Unknown - Side-By-Side Shotgun - .410 Bore, 20 Gauge, 12 Gauge)
- Stoeger Coach Gun Double Defense (Federative Republic of Brazil - Unknown - Side-By-Side Shotgun - .410 Bore, 20 Gauge, 12 Gauge)
- Stoeger Coach Gun Double Supreme (Federative Republic of Brazil - Unknown - Side-By-Side Shotgun - .410 Bore, 20 Gauge, 12 Gauge)
- Stoeger Condor Outback (Federative Republic of Brazil - Unknown - Break-Action Over-And-Under Shotgun - 20 Gauge, 12 Gauge)
- Stoeger Condor Supreme (Federative Republic of Brazil - Unknown - Break-Action Over-And-Under Shotgun - .410 Bore, 20 Gauge, 16 Gauge, 12 Gauge)
- Stoner 63(US - 1962 - Assault Rifle - 5.56×45mm NATO)
- Stoner M96W (US - 1962 - Battle Rifle - 7.62×51mm NATO: Prototype)
- Stoner 62 (US - 1962 - Battle Rifle - 7.62×51mm NATO: Prototype)
- Stoner 63 Survival Rifle (US - 1964 - Carbine - 5.56×45mm NATO: Prototype)
- Stoner 63A (US - 1967 - Assault Rifle - 5.56×45mm NATO)
- XM22E1 (US - 1967 - Squad Automatic Weapon - 5.56×45mm NATO: Prototype)
- Stoner 63A Automatic Rifle (US - 1967 - Assault Rifle - 5.56×45mm NATO)
- Stoner 63A Carbine (US - 1967 - Carbine - 5.56×45mm NATO)
- XM23 (US - 1967 - Carbine - 5.56×45mm NATO: Prototype)
- Stoner 63A Commando/Mk 23 Mod 0 (US - 1967 Squad Automatic Weapon - 5.56×45mm NATO)
- Stoner 63A Fixed Machine Gun (US - 1967 - Squad Automatic Weapon - 5.56×45mm NATO)
- Stoner 63A LMG (US - 1967 - Squad Automatic Weapon - 5.56×45mm NATO)
- XM207E1 (US - 1967 - Squad Automatic Weapon - 5.56×45mm NATO: Prototype)
- XM207E2 (United States - 1967 - Squad Automatic Weapon - 5.56×45mm NATO: Prototype)
- Stoner 63A MMG (US - 1967 - Medium Machine Gun, Squad Automatic Weapon - 5.56×45mm NATO)
- XM22 (US - 1967 - Squad Automatic Weapon - 5.56×45mm NATO: Prototype)
- Stoner 86 (US - 1986 - Light Machine Gun - 5.56×45mm NATO)
- Strayer-Voight Infinity (US - Unknown - Semi-Automatic Pistol - .40 S&W, .45 ACP)
- Sumitomo Heavy Industries
- Machine Guns
- NTK-62(Japan - 1962 - General-Purpose Machine Gun - 7.62×51mm NATO)
- Type 74 Machine Gun (Japan - 1974 - APC-Mounted General-Purpose Machine Gun - 7.62×51mm NATO)
- Sumitomo M249 (Japan - Light Machine Gun - 5.56×45mm NATO)
- Suomi KP/-31 (Republic of Finland - 1931 - Submachine Gun - 9×19mm Parabellum)
- SVT-40 (Soviet Union - 1940 - Semi-Automatic Rifle - 7.62×54mmR)
- AVT-40 (Soviet Union - 1942 - Battle Rifle - 7.62×54mmR)
- SKT-40 (Soviet Union - 1940 - Semi-Automatic Carbine - 7.62×54mmR)
- SKT-40 7.62×39mm Variant (Soviet Union - 1940 - Semi-Automatic Rifle - 7.62×39mm: Prototype)
- SVT-38 (Soviet Union - 1938 - Semi-Automatic Rifle - 7.62×54mmR)
- SVT-40 Sniper Variant (Soviet Union - 1940 - Semi-Automatic Sniper Rifle - 7.62×54mmR)
- Swedish Armed Forces Small Arms Designations
- Rifles
- Psg 90 (Sweden/United Kingdom of Great Britain and Northern Ireland - Swedish Armed Forces/Accuracy International - 1991 - Bolt-Action Sniper Rifle - 7.62×51mm NATO, .308 Winchester: Swedish variant of the British Accuracy International Arctic Warfare bolt-action sniper rifle. Features a Hensoldt telescopic sight.)

== See also ==
- List of firearms by era
  - List of pre-20th century firearms
  - List of World War II firearms
- List of firearms by country
  - List of modern Russian small arms
- Lists of firearms by actions
  - List of blow-forward firearms
  - List of delayed-blowback firearms
- List of firearms by type
  - List of assault rifles
  - List of battle rifles
  - List of carbines
  - List of firearm brands
  - List of flamethrowers
  - List of machine guns
  - List of multiple-barrel firearms
  - List of pistols
  - List of shotguns
  - List of sniper rifles
  - List of submachine guns
- List of firearm cartridges
  - List of handgun cartridges
  - List of rifle cartridges
- List of semi-automatic firearms
  - List of semi-automatic pistols
  - List of semi-automatic rifles
  - List of semi-automatic shotguns
  - List of most-produced firearms
