= Smith & Wesson Model 422 =

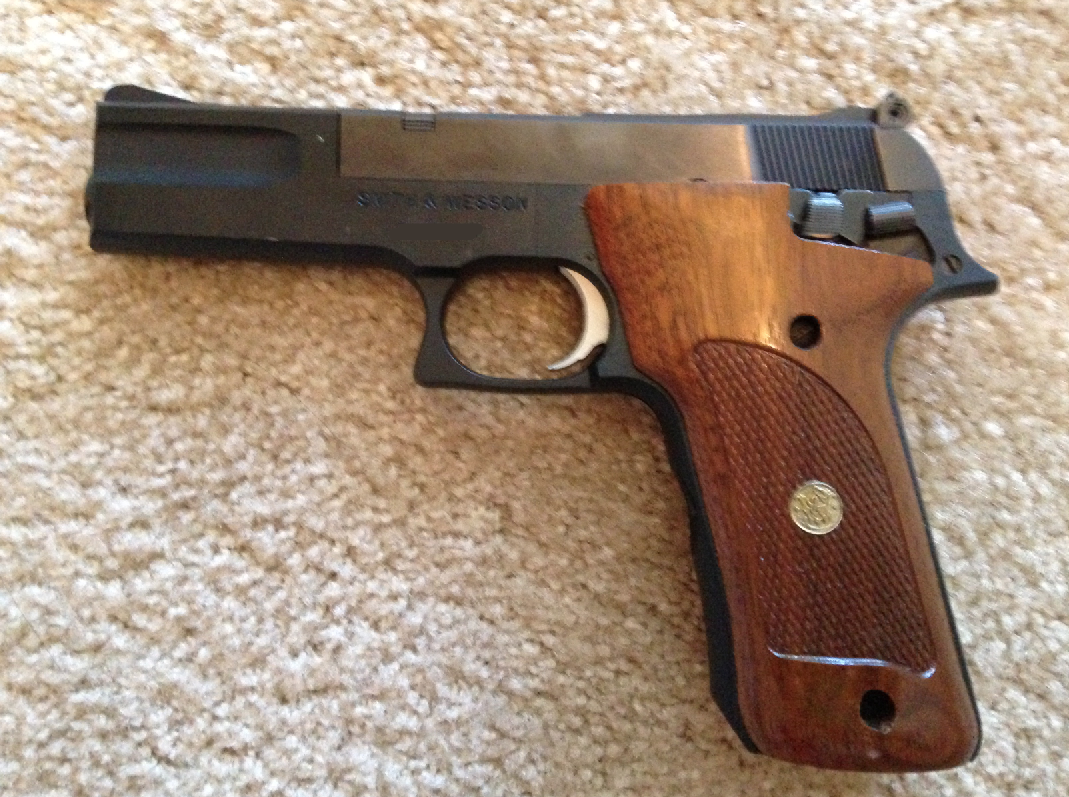
- Type: Semi-automatic pistol
- Place of origin: United States

Production history
- Manufacturer: Smith & Wesson
- Produced: 1987–1996

Specifications
- Mass: 22 (4.5") and 23.5 oz (6")
- Length: 7.5" overall with 4.5" bbl
- Cartridge: .22 Long Rifle
- Caliber: .22
- Barrels: 4.5" and 6"
- Action: Blowback
- Effective firing range: 50 yds
- Feed system: 10- or 12-round box magazine
- Sights: Fixed (field) or adjustable (target)

The Smith & Wesson Model 422, is a semi automatic .22 LR pistol manufactured by Smith & Wesson.

== Production history ==
Produced from 1987 to 1996, the Model 422 was the company's entry into the lucrative mid-priced rimfire pistol market. This niche was, at the time, dominated by Sturm Ruger's highly successful Mk I and Mk II series of pistols. Smith & Wesson had previously left the market position after 1966, when the Model 46 was dropped from their catalog. The pistol retailed for roughly $250US before it was discontinued in 1996.

== Design details ==
Along with all the variants listed below, a unique design feature of the 422 was that the barrel resided in a low position in the frame just above the trigger guard. The barrel is non-moving and fixed to the frame. It came threaded from the factory, but the "barrel nut" was used to affix the barrel to the frame. This made this pistol line perfect for use with a suppressor with an aftermarket adapter since the sights could still be utilized.

The bolt assembly, which comprised the top rearward portion of the pistol, moved behind as well as above the axis of the barrel and resembled an L shape. The recoil spring was contained in the portion above the bolt, which also housed the firing pin. Above the barrel was a large frame lug, which gave the gun a pleasing look of constant width and depth from the trigger guard forward to the muzzle, while also serving as a solid block for the bolt to hit against when the recoil spring returned the bolt to battery. The low bore axis served to greatly reduce muzzle jump, and served to allow the fitting of a suppressor without losing the use of the factory sights.

The Model 422 was introduced with a 12-round detachable box magazine, but was later shipped with a 10-round magazine, in answer to a 1992 high-capacity magazine ban in California, which outlawed selling magazines holding more than 10 rounds.

== Variants ==
- S&W 622: Same alloy frame and barrel length options as the 422 but in a silver colored frame with a stainless steel slide.
- S&W 622VR: Same as the regular 622 but has a ventilated rib (VR) cut in the frame above the barrel. Made only in 1996 in limited numbers. Some made in Houlton Maine have a painted silver frame instead of anodized.
- S&W 2205: A blue steel variant introduced in the 1992 SHOT Show. Never entered mass production with only 15 manufactured.
- S&W 2206: Both the frame and the slide are stainless steel. That makes this model noticeably heavier than the alloy frames of the 422 and 622.
- S&W 2213: Short-barrel version (3-inch) of the 622. Also uses silver alloy frame and stainless steel slide. 8-round flush box magazine. The 10- and 12-round magazine of the full size works as well, but will extend from the bottom of the grip.
- S&W 2214: Short-barrel version (3-inch) of the 422 with blued alloy frame and blued slide. 8-round flush box magazine. The 10- and 12-round magazine of the full size works as well, but will extend from the bottom of the grip.

== See also ==
- Smith & Wesson Model 61
