= Smith & Wesson Model 619 & 620 =

- Type: Revolver
- Place of origin: United States

Production history
- Manufacturer: Smith & Wesson

Specifications
- Mass: 37.9 ounces (1,070 g)
- Length: 9 1/2 inches (240 mm)
- Barrel length: 4 inches (100 mm)
- Cartridge: .357 Magnum, .38 Special
- Action: Double action
- Feed system: Seven-round cylinder
- Sights: Fixed rear sights (619); Adjustable rear open sights (620)

The Smith & Wesson models 619 and 620 are seven-shot revolvers chambered for the .357 Magnum cartridge introduced by the Smith & Wesson company in 2005. The 619 has fixed rear sights while the 620 comes with adjustable rear sights and a different handgrip.

These revolvers are often mistaken for members of the 686 family. In actuality, they are descendants of the model 65 and model 66. The 65 and 66 models were discontinued, and the 619 and 620 filled their place as the next generation. They were updated to current Smith & Wesson standards with the addition of a key-lock safety as well as seven-round cylinders. The K-Frame of the 65 and 66 was replaced with the newer, reinforced L-Frame.

== 620 vs 686P ==
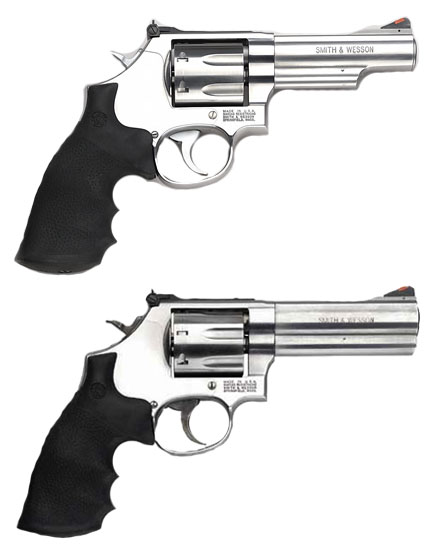
Smith & Wesson model 620 (top) compared to model 686P (bottom)

Both the 620 and the 686 are based on the Smith & Wesson L-Frame. The most obvious distinction is that the 620 has a half-lug, two-piece barrel while the 686 features a full-underlug one-piece barrel.

Both are available in four inch barrels with seven shot capacity.

Weights and lengths of these models are almost identical, with the 620 weighing 37.9 oz, to the 686's 38 oz, and the 620 being 9 1/2" long, to the 686’s 9 5/8".
