= MGP-15 submachine gun =

MGP-15
- Type: Submachine gun or machine pistol
- Place of origin: Peru

Service history
- Used by: Peru

Production history
- Designed: 1990
- Manufacturer: SIMA
- Variants: See Variants

Specifications
- Mass: 2.31 kg (empty); 2.29 (with 32-round magazine)
- Length: 503 / 284mm (stock extended/folded)
- Cartridge: 9×19mm Parabellum
- Action: Blowback, Semi-automatic
- Rate of fire: 650–750 rounds/min
- Muzzle velocity: 342 m/s
- Feed system: 20 or 32-round magazine

The MGP-15 is a submachine gun designed for issue to special forces made by SIMA-CEFAR, updated with a longer barrel and other features. The name was changed from previous MGP models due to modifications, including a change to a barrel with a threaded muzzle, usually fitted with a screwed-on muzzle cap, that allows a suppressor to be quickly screwed on.

== Design ==
Like all MGP submachine guns, the weapon can utilize Uzi submachine gun magazines. A folding butt stock is provided, so arranged that with the butt folded along the right-hand side of the receiver the butt plate can act as a form of foregrip.

== Variants ==
- MGP-84

An upgraded version of the MGP-15. Used in close protection duties.

- MGP-14

A semi-automatic version of the MGP-84, which has a folding forward grip. Also known as the MGP-14 Micro or as the MGP-14 Pistol. For a time, it was known as the MGP-84C.

== Bibliography ==
- Hogg, Ian (2000). Jane's Guns Recognition Guide Second Edition. Glasgow: Janes. ISBN 0-00-472453-4.

== See also ==
- MGP submachine gun
