= Smith & Wesson Model 22A =

Semi-automatic pistol

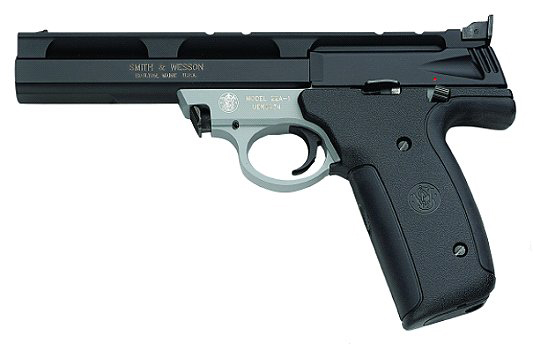
- S&W 22A
- Type: Semi-automatic pistol
- Place of origin: United States

Production history
- Manufacturer: Smith & Wesson
- Unit cost: $329
- Variants: Standard Issue (SI); Service Grade (SG); Service Grade Commander (SGC); Titanium Edition (TI); Titanium Edition Commander (TIC)

Specifications
- Mass: 975.2 g (2.150 lb) empty, w/ magazine
- Length: 24.1 cm (9.5 in)
- Barrel length: 13.9 cm (5.5 in)
- Cartridge: .22 Long Rifle
- Action: Blowback operated Semi-automatic
- Muzzle velocity: 490 m/s
- Feed system: 10-round detachable box magazine
- Sights: Patridge front sight, adjustable rear sight

The Smith & Wesson Model 22A is a semi-automatic pistol that was manufactured in Houlton, Maine. The 22A is a full-size pistol with an aluminum alloy frame. The steel barrel has an integrated Weaver style rail (similar to a Picatinny).

This pistol is distinguished by two features: An integral rail along the top edge of the gun permits easy mounting of optical sights and other accessories. The gun's alloy frame and alloy-shrouded barrel help keep weight down for a full-sized pistol.

The Smith & Wesson Model 22S is identical in all respects, except that it has a stainless steel barrel, painted gray.

== Design ==
The 22A is a hammer-fired, semi-automatic .22 caliber pistol. The enclosed hammer rotates in the frame, hitting the rear of the firing pin in the slide, which then hits the rim of the chambered round. After chambering the first round by pulling back and releasing the slide, each firing ejects the spent cartridge, cocks the hammer, and then strips a new round from the magazine and loads it into the chamber. The hammer is automatically cocked, and pulling the trigger simply releases it. This results in a lower trigger pull force unlike a double-action pistol where the trigger must first cock the hammer and then release it.

A frame mounted safety switch is present along the left side of the frame in the conventional location to be operated by the user's right thumb. Patridge-type target sights are standard on this gun, with the rear sight adjustable for both windage and elevation. The front sight is integral with the barrel shroud and is not removable or adjustable. An integral feed ramp at the barrel breech helps assure reliable loading of rounds into the chamber from the magazine.

Later models incorporate a magazine safety that does not permit the gun to fire unless the magazine is fully seated. This feature helps prevent accidental discharge during careless handling especially during cleaning.

The magazine release is located on the front of the grip making it easy to locate and also makes it ambidextrous since it is equally well placed for both right and left handed shooters. This is more of a problem for people with smaller hands where the finger tips may lay on the front of the handle when gripping the gun.

The gun takes down for cleaning via a pushbutton at the front that disengages the barrel from the frame. It is therefore possible to rapidly exchange barrels, for example to switch on and off one with a mounted scope, etc.

There were several variants in terms of available barrel length (4", 5 1/2", 7"), target grips, and frame colors (gray or black). The stainless steel version (as opposed to the blued steel) was called the 22S.
