= Smith & Wesson SW99 =

S&W SW99
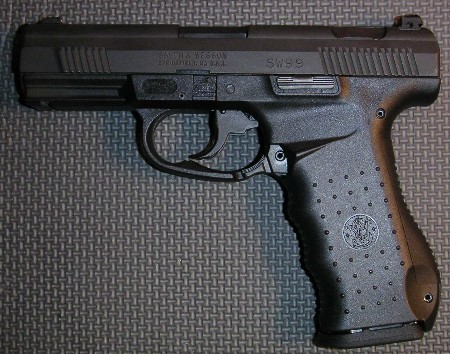
- Smith & Wesson SW99
- Type: Semi-automatic pistol
- Place of origin: Germany; United States

Production history
- Designer: Walther Arms
- Manufacturer: Smith & Wesson
- Produced: 1999–2006
- Variants: SW99, SW99QA, SW990, SW990L (Full and compact sizes)

Specifications
- Mass: 700 g (unloaded)
- Length: 180 mm (7.1 in)
- Barrel length: 110 mm (4 1/4 in)
- Cartridge: 9×19mm Parabellum.40 S&W.45 ACP
- Action: Recoil operation
- Feed system: Detachable magazine capacity; 9 rounds single stack (.45 ACP); 12 rounds (.40 S&W); 16 rounds (9mm Parabellum)
- Sights: Adjustable three-dot iron sights

The SW99 rendition of the popular Walther P99 was the product of a joint collaboration between Smith & Wesson and Walther.

== Description ==
The Smith & Wesson SW99 is a modern, polymer frame pistol that is nearly identical to the Walther P99.

The SW99 features an internal striker, as opposed to the classical external hammer. It is chambered in 9×19mm Parabellum, .40 S&W, and .45 ACP.

=== Mechanism ===
The pistol lacks a manual safety; instead a de-cocking button is placed on the top rear section of the slide, which when actuated, places the firearm into double-action mode.

The SW99 features several safety features including a loaded chamber indicator on the right side of the slide, a protruding, red-painted cocking indicator, and a drop safety.

As with the P99, the cocking indicator does not protrude from the slide of the QA variant unless the weapon is fired, as it is in a constant partially cocked state.

The SW99 also features a fully supported chamber design, which leaves no portion of the chambered round exposed.

Because of this there is less chance of casing head rupture, reducing risk of injury to the shooter and/or destruction of the pistol.

=== Grip ===
The unique and ergonomic grip of this pistol was designed by the renowned Swiss match pistol grip designer, Cesare Morini.

Much like the P99, the pistol comes with three varying rear grip inserts designed to accommodate various hand shapes and sizes; this feature permits most shooters a comfortable and efficient grip on the firearm.

=== Differences between SW99 and P99 ===
Though there are slight variations in aesthetic design, the function of the SW99 is identical to its German-made counterpart.

Magazines can be interchanged between the two models, but the pistols are considered to be two separate types, and are easily distinguished from each other by the trigger guard, grip and slide design.

Design differences between the P99 and SW99 are most notable on the frame of the pistol; the grip and trigger guard both have a slightly different shape. The slide is somewhat different as well, offering serrations in both the front and rear of the slide, while the P99 only has them on the rear.

The most prominent distinction between the two firearms is that the SW99 is available in .45 ACP, while the P99 is not.

== Production ==
The modified receiver used in the SW99 is supplied by Walther and is manufactured in Germany.

Smith & Wesson manufactures the slide and barrel of the SW99 in the United States.

== Variants ==
=== SW99 ===
This version of the pistol has a double/single action; it shares the same "Anti-Stress" trigger action as the P99 AS.

=== SW99O ===
The SW99O variant does not incorporate a de-cocking button as the other models do. The firearm is in a constant double-action mode, and the trigger has the same long heavy trigger pull as the SW99 in double action mode, and will reset as such with each cycle. This firearm can be compared to the P99 DAO/P990.

=== SW99 QA ===
The SW99 QA and SW990L feature a shorter and lighter trigger pull. The action can be compared to those of Glock pistols.

Unlike the standard SW99, the de-cocking button found on the SW99 QA need only be actuated before take-down, as doing so renders the firearm inoperable.

=== SW990L ===
The later production SW990L eliminated the de-cocking button, but otherwise, the trigger pull and trigger reset of the SW99 QA and the SW990L are both the Quick Action type.

=== SW99C ===
The compact version of the SW99.

== Users ==
- United States
  - Durham Police Department
  - Charlotte-Mecklenburg Police Department
