= SIG 522 =

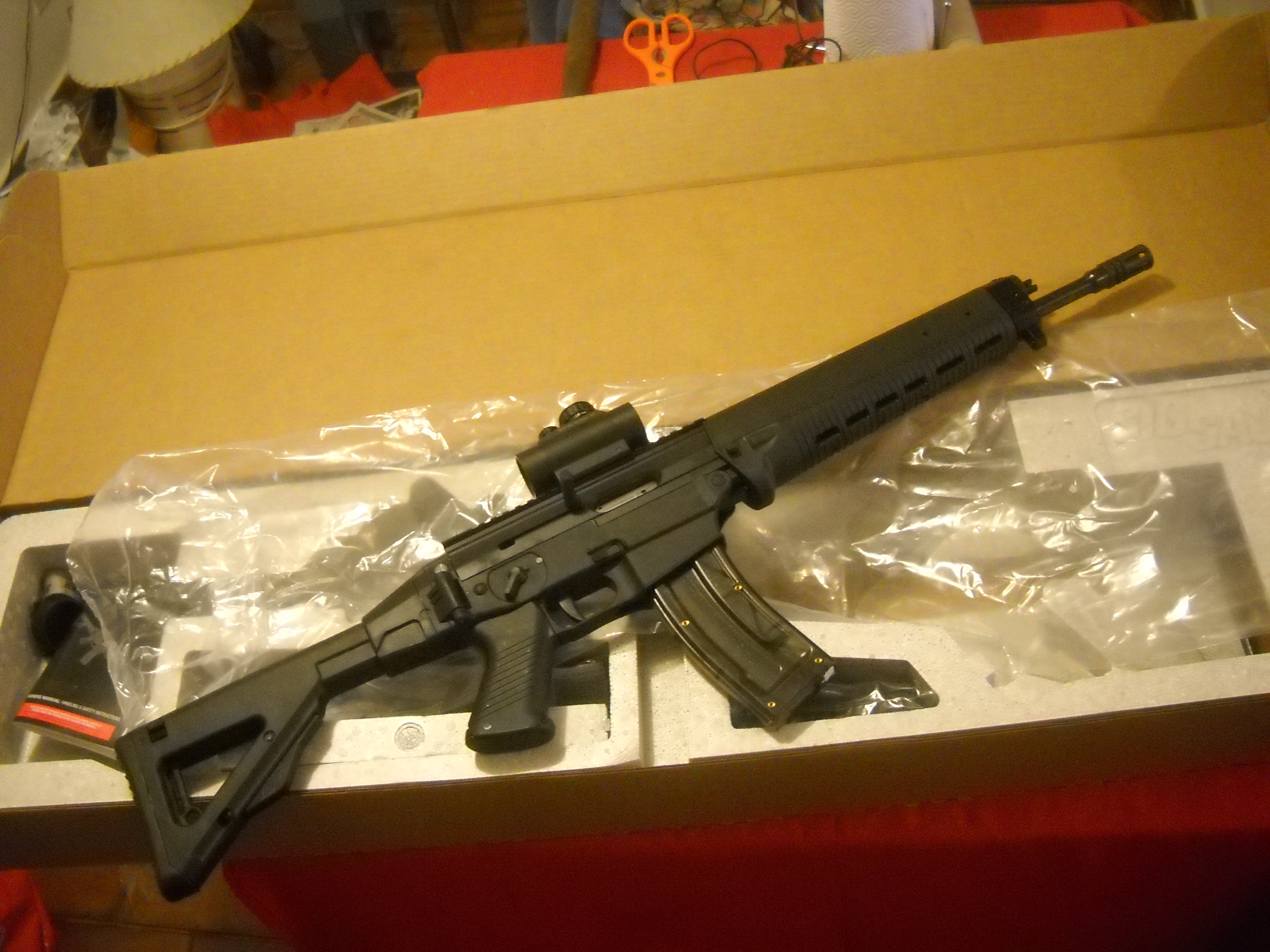
- Type: Cadet rifle
- Place of origin: Germany

Production history
- Manufacturer: SIG Sauer
- Produced: 2009–2015
- Variants: See Variants

Specifications (R522)
- Mass: 2.8 kg (6.2 lb) (unloaded)
- Length: 892 mm (35.1 in)
- Barrel length: 422 mm (16.6 in)
- Cartridge: .22 Long Rifle
- Caliber: 5.6 mm (0.22 in)
- Action: Blowback operated
- Muzzle velocity: 500 m/s (1,640 ft/s)
- Effective firing range: 140 meters
- Feed system: 10- and 25-round box magazine; 50-round drum magazine.

The SIG Sauer 522 LR is a .22 LR semi-automatic, blowback operated rifle. It is patterned after the SIG 55x series rifles that fire 5.56x45mm centerfire cartridges. The 522 fires .22 LR ammunition and serves as a training rifle for its larger counterparts due to mostly identical controls and features. It differs from its centerfire counterpart in a number of ways. The 522 series has no adjustable gas block as the 55x series does. Instead, a mock gas block is installed. SIG refers to this as a storage container. Instead of 30-round magazines, the 522 series accepts 10-round or 25-round magazines that are manufactured by Black Dog Machine and re-branded for distribution with the SIG 522. Black Dog also produces a 50 round drum magazine for the 522.

== Variants ==
=== 522 Classic ===
The SIG 522 Classic has a standard polymer handguard, M1913 Picatinny rail on top of the receiver, and folding and telescoping stock. A flash hider modeled after the M16A2 style "Bird Cage" flash suppressor is installed. Options include SIG Sauer iron sights and a SIG-branded mini red dot sight that mounts on top of the Picatinny rail. Barrel length is 422 millimetres (16.6 in), and weight is 2.9 kg (6 lb 6 oz).

=== 522 SWAT ===
SIG's 522 SWAT differs from the base classic model by adding a full length Picatinny quad rail forward stock. Weight is 2.9 kg, and the SWAT has the same flash hider as the Classic.

=== 522 Commando ===
The 522 Commando features a folding stock and mock suppressor mounted to 1/2 × 28 TPI threads. It has the standard non-railed polymer handguards. It weighs 2.78 kg (6 lb 2 oz).

=== 522 SWAT Commando ===
The 522 SWAT Commando features the same mock suppressor mounted to the 522 Commando, but adds a shorter version of the SWAT's aluminum railed front end. It weighs the same as the 522 Commando at 2.78 kg.

=== 522 Target ===
The newest in the 522 lineup, the SIG Sauer 522 Target has an aluminum tube front end that is free floated from the barrel to increase accuracy. It is equipped with a variable power scope mounted to the top Picatinny rail and a 508 mm (20 in) barrel. It weighs about 3.18 kg (7.0 lb).
