= Smith & Wesson Model 73 =

Revolver

The S&W Model 73 was a .38 Special caliber revolver manufactured by Smith & Wesson.

== History and description ==
The Model 73 was made in only 5,000 units in 1973. It was made in C-frame, and was the only model to feature this frame. It was a J-frame modified to take a six-shot K-frame cylinder. It was Smith & Wesson's answer to the Colt Detective Special.

The revolver was made with an offset cylinder stop, which made it difficult to manufacture and test. As a result, most Model 73s were destroyed for safety reasons; it is estimated that there are no more than 20 left in private ownership.
