= SIG Sauer P239 =

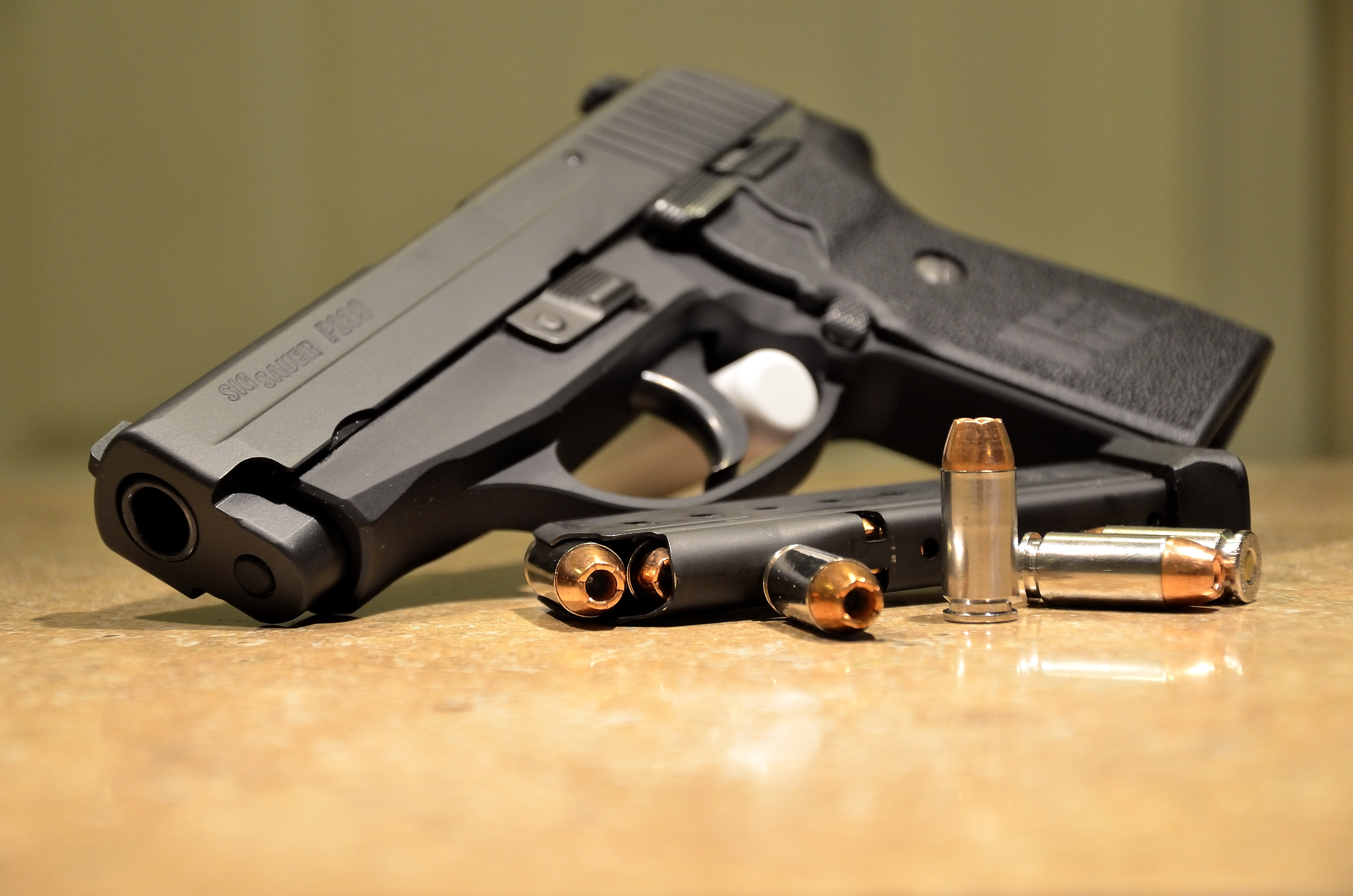
- Type: Semi-automatic pistol
- Place of origin: Germany

Production history
- Manufacturer: SIG Sauer
- Produced: 1996–2018
- Variants: See Variants

Specifications
- Mass: 714 g (25.2 oz) (9×19mm); 776 g (27.4 oz) (.40 or .357)
- Length: 168 mm (6.6 in)
- Barrel length: 91 mm (3.6 in)
- Height: 130 mm (5.1 in) / 132 mm (5.2 in)
- Cartridge: 9×19mm Parabellum; .40 S&W; .357 SIG
- Feed system: detachable box magazine: 8- or 10-round (9×19mm); 7- or 8-round (.40 or .357)
- Sights: Fixed Bar/Dot, rear is drift adjustable

The SIG Sauer P239 is a semi-automatic pistol designed and manufactured by SIG Sauer—both SIG Sauer GmbH in Germany and SIG Sauer Inc. of New Hampshire, United States. It was produced from 1996 to 2018, and offered in three calibers: 9×19mm Parabellum, .357 SIG and .40 S&W. The P239 became popular in the United States as a concealed carry pistol.

== Specifications ==
The P239 has a 91-millimetre (3.6 in) barrel with an overall length of 168 millimetres (6.6 in) and height of 132 millimetres (5.2 in), weighing approximately 710–770 g (25–27 oz) empty, depending on caliber. The included single-stack magazine has a capacity of 8 rounds (9×19mm) or 7 rounds (.357 SIG or .40 S&W). The P239 was initially available as double action / single action (DA/SA); later, it was also offered as double-action only (DAO).

== Variants ==
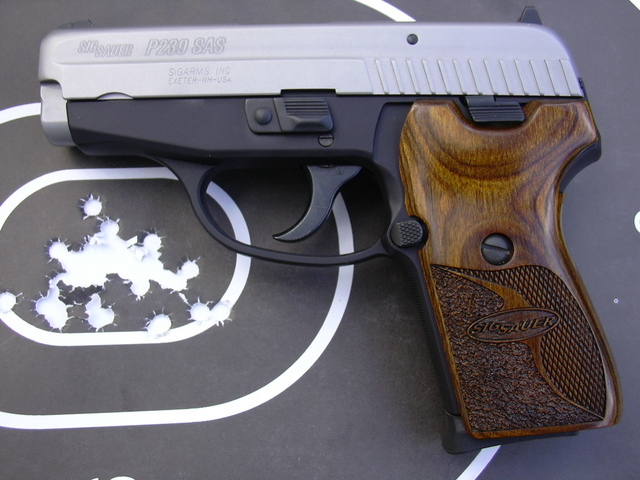
SIG P239 SAS

P239 DAK – this variant has a Double Action Kellerman (DAK) trigger.

P239 SAS – a SIG Anti-Snag (SAS) variant with "an ultra smooth, snag free profile" for concealed carry.

P239 Tactical – this variant includes a 4.0-inch (100 mm) threaded barrel (for use with a suppressor), short reset trigger (SRT), and optional 10-round extended magazine; it is only chambered in 9×19mm Parabellum.

== Users ==
In 2004, the U.S. Immigration and Customs Enforcement (ICE) contracted with SIG Sauer for the purchase of up to 65,000 pistols, among them double-action only (DAO) model .40 caliber P239s.

The US Navy's Naval Criminal Investigative Service (NCIS) purchased P239 pistols in .40 caliber (along with P229 pistols with Double Action Kellerman triggers) to replace their aging 9mm M11 pistols.
