= Smith & Wesson Model 910 =

Smith & Wesson Model 915 and 910
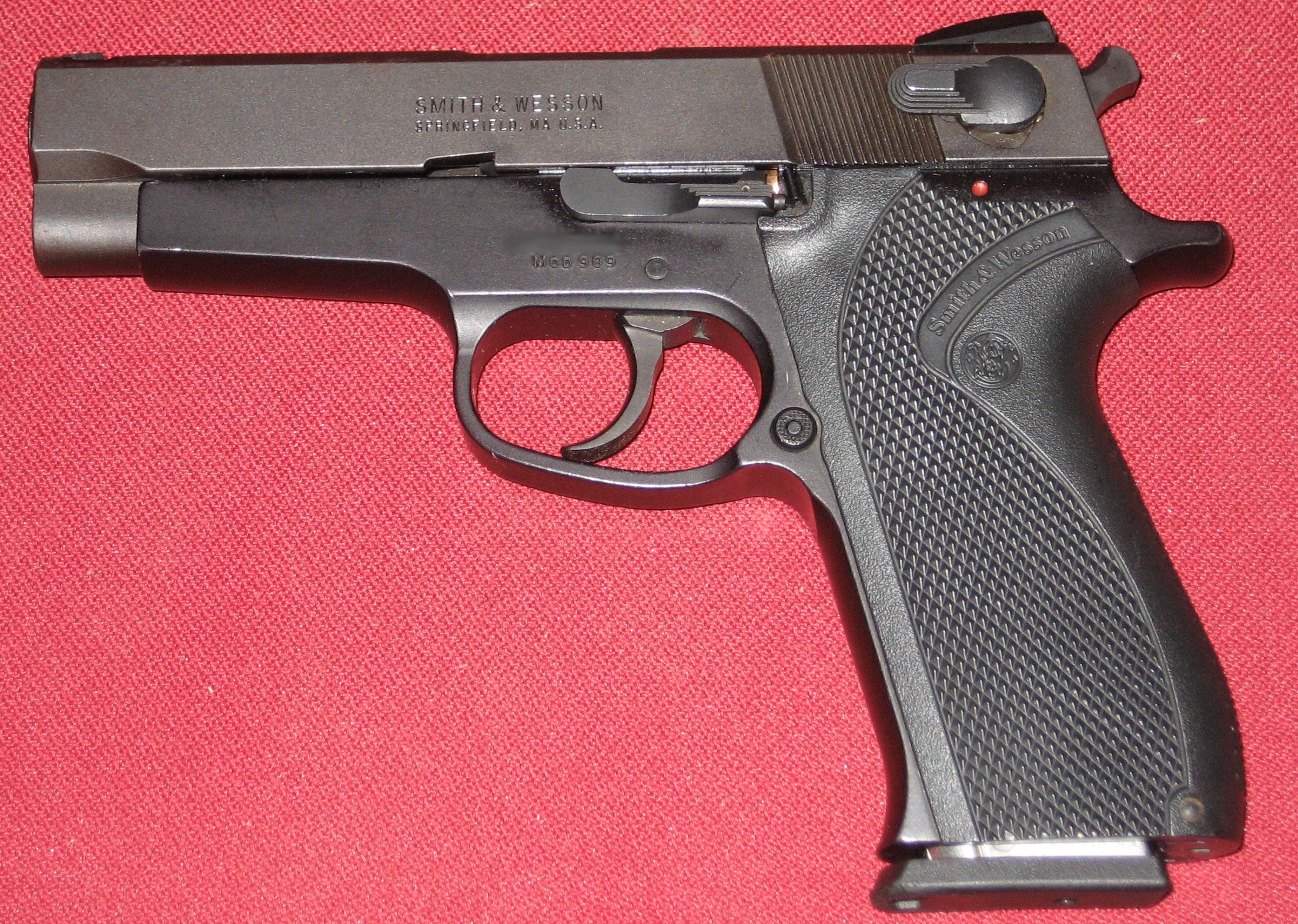
- Smith & Wesson Model 909, a "value series" version of the Model 3906
- Type: Semi-automatic pistol
- Place of origin: United States

Production history
- Manufacturer: Smith & Wesson
- Produced: 1992–2006
- Variants: Model 915 and Model 910

Specifications
- Mass: 28.5 oz (808 gr) (empty)
- Length: 7.375 in (187 mm)
- Barrel length: 4 in (101 mm)
- Caliber: 9×19mm Parabellum
- Action: Short recoil DA/SA
- Feed system: 10- or 15- round detachable box magazine
- Sights: Fixed three-dot; night sights available; one variant of the Model 910 produced with a fiber-optic front sight.

The Smith & Wesson Models 908, 908s, 909, 910, and 915 are 9×19mm Parabellum (9mm Luger), short-recoil-operated double-action/single action (DA/SA) semi-automatic pistols Value Series pistols. All of these pistols utilize a stainless barrel, an aluminum alloy frame, and either a carbon steel or stainless steel slide. The S&W Model 915 was produced from 1992 to 1994, while the S&W Model 910 was introduced in 1995 as a replacement for the Model 915 and was manufactured through 2006.

== History ==
Despite using a three-digit model number, both the Model 915 and the Model 910 are in fact 3rd Generation Smith & Wesson auto pistols, and were part of the Value Series that incorporated several features to cut the costs associated with manufacturing. The first two digits reflect the caliber (9, 40, or 45). The 915 and 910 are both based on the Smith & Wesson 5904 - the numeral 9 stands for "9mm" (the caliber), and the following digits 15 and 10 for the magazine capacity, respectively. Like the Model 5904, both the 915 and 910 utilized a carbon steel slide and an aluminum alloy frame.

In order to reduce production costs, both the Model 915 and Model 910 were made with only one safety/decocker lever (left side) as well as a matte finish with certain external machine operations omitted on the exterior of the pistol. The Model 915 was made with all-metal parts, while the follow-on Model 910 utilized additional economies including a plastic rear sight, recoil guide rod, and magazine release button, as well as additional omitted finish machine operations to further save on manufacturing expenses. The earlier Model 915 also has a lug on the barrel and a corresponding cut in the slide, while the later 910 omits the barrel lug by locking the barrel hood against the front of the slide ejection port. Both models have a reputation as reliable, robust service-type pistols.

During its production run, the Model 915 featured a 15-round, double-stack magazine. The S&W Model 910 was initially provided a 10-round double-stack magazine in response to the requirements of the federal Violent Crime Control and Law Enforcement Act of 1994. In 2005, after the expiration of the Act, the 910 was upgraded to a 15-round double-stack magazine. Magazines for the 915 and 910 are the same overall design as those used in the 59XX-series pistols and are interchangeable.

== Variants ==
The 908 and 908s are compact models similar to the Model 3914 and utilized a single-stack magazine of eight rounds capacity, while the Model 909 was a full-size pistol similar to the Model 3904, with a 9-round single-stack magazine.

The 908 and 909 featured a blued carbon steel slide and aluminum alloy frame, while the 908s comes with a stainless steel slide and barrel and aluminum alloy frame.
