= Smith & Wesson Model 1006 =

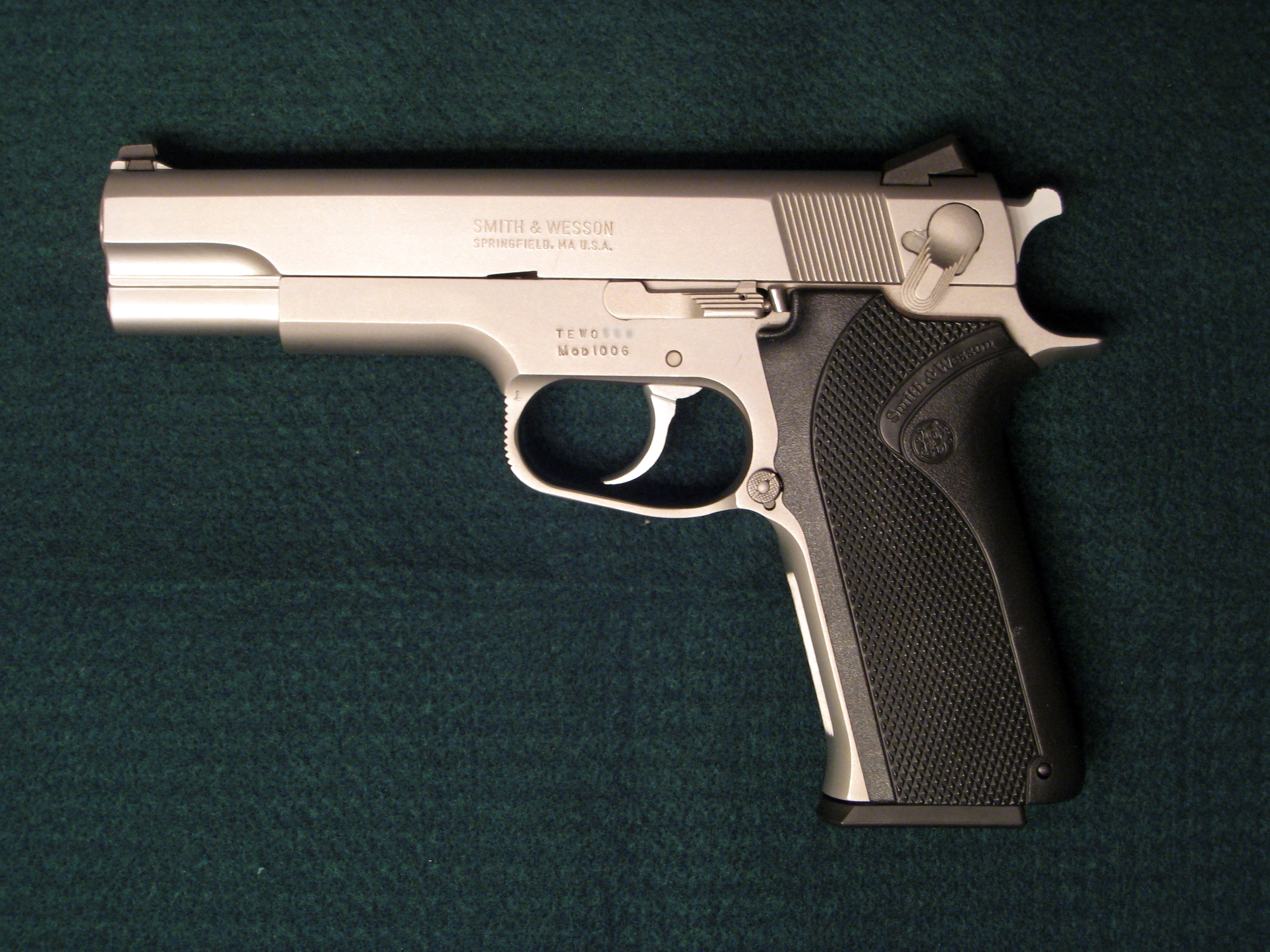
- Smith & Wesson 1006
- Type: Semi-automatic handgun
- Place of origin: United States

Production history
- Manufacturer: Smith & Wesson
- Produced: 1990–1995
- Variants: 1026, 1046, 1066, 1076 (FBI model) and 1086

Specifications
- Mass: 2 lb, 10 oz (Fixed sights, 2nd trigger guard, as in photo)
- Barrel length: 5 in (127.0 mm)
- Cartridge: 10mm Auto
- Action: Recoil operated DA/SA
- Feed system: 9-round single stack magazine

The Smith & Wesson Model 1006 is a recoil operated double-action/single-action semi-automatic handgun chambered in the 10mm Auto cartridge manufactured by Smith & Wesson.

== Design ==
It is constructed entirely of stainless steel, a 5 in (127 mm) barrel and a 9-round single column magazine. Its safety is a slide mounted de-cock/safety, internal safeties are a magazine disconnect and firing pin block. It is available with fixed or adjustable sights. The pistols were originally made with the 2nd trigger guard, which has an elongated, oval shape (see photo); in 1992 the frame was redesigned with the shorter, rounder 3rd trigger guard.

The model 1006 was the first in the S&W 1000 series of third generation semi-automatic handguns. Variations include the models 1026, 1046, 1066, 1076 (FBI model) and 1086. The 1000 series were some of the most robust, sturdy 10mm handguns ever built, easily handling the power of this potent cartridge.

Other third generation S&W auto series include the 5906, 4006 and 4506.

== Users ==
The Model 1076 is most commonly known as the "FBI Pistol" because the Federal Bureau of Investigation (FBI) ordered 10,000 Model 1076 pistols for its agents in the aftermath of the 1986 FBI Miami shootout. However, problems developed and the FBI received only 2,400 pistols before the contract was cancelled. In 1990 the Virginia State Police contracted with S&W for 2,200 Model 1026 pistols, and by July 1990 they had received the entire order. The Model 1026 was identical to the FBI's Model 1076 but with a 5-inch barrel instead of a 4.25 inch barrel. The Virginia State Police also experienced issues with the pistol and the reduced power load recommended by the FBI. In 1994, based on continuing problems with the 1026, the Virginia State Police traded them in for the SIG Sauer P228 pistol in 9mm.

== Recalls ==
Shortly after the 1006 pistol was introduced, Smith and Wesson issued a recall on the one-piece plastic grip. It seems when the pistol was dropped on its heel, the plastic grip could break, allowing the hammer spring to fly free. Customers who contacted Smith and Wesson were sent new grips at no charge. The new replacement grip has a center punched mark on the bottom of the heel, whereas the bad grips did not.

The 1026/1076 also had a recall issued, due to issues with the decocking lever that could potentially render the pistols inoperable.

== Variants ==
- S&W 1026: Double Action / Single Action (DA/SA) gun with frame-mounted decocker only and 5″ barrel.
- S&W 1046: Double Action Only (DAO) gun with 5″ barrel.
- S&W 1066: Double Action / Single Action (DA/SA) gun with slide-mounted decocker / safety and 4.25″ barrel.
- S&W 1076: Double Action / Single Action (DA/SA) gun with frame-mounted decocker only and 4.25″ barrel.
- S&W 1086: Double Action Only (DAO) gun with 4.25″ barrel.

== Total production numbers ==
According to Smith and Wesson, a total of 50,796 10mm Auto pistols were produced.

Model	Total produced
1006	26,978
1026	3,135
1046	151
1066	5,067
1076	13,805
1086	1,660
