= Smith & Wesson Model 64 =

- A police issued Model 64
- Type: Revolver
- Place of origin: United States

Production history
- Designed: 1970
- Manufacturer: Smith & Wesson
- Unit cost: $689
- Produced: 1970–October 2021
- Variants: numerous

Specifications
- Cartridge: .38 Special
- Barrels: 2, 3, and 4 inches. The 6 inch was rare.
- Action: Single/double action or double action only (DAO)
- Feed system: 6 shot cylinder

The Smith & Wesson Model 64 is the stainless steel version of the Model 10 revolver.

== Description ==
The Model 64 is a six-shot single-action, double-action, or double-action only (DAO) revolver with fixed sights chambered in .38 Special. It was the second all stainless steel revolver made by Smith & Wesson, following the Smith & Wesson Model 60. It was widely used by several U.S. police, sheriff and state agencies and was a popular choice in high humidity states because the stainless model 64 was more corrosion and rust resistant than the blued Model 10.

Originally offered in two variants, a 4" taper barrelled square butt or a 2" round butt, the Model 64 has since been offered in numerous configurations. The 4" heavy barreled version, introduced in 1974, became a favorite with many police agencies. Five variants were made for NYPD and these revolvers are marked "NY1" as opposed to the more common "NYCPD" marking for department issued guns as these were intended to be purchased by individual officers. It was one of the two stainless steel revolvers authorized for use by NYPD, (the other being the Ruger Service-Six) as well as one of the last revolvers approved for use being replaced by 9mm semiautomatic pistols in 1993.

Noted for its accuracy, dependability and manageable recoil, the Model 64 is still in use for security, inmate transportation (corrections), target shooting, formal target competition and personal defense.

== Specifications ==
- Caliber: .38 Special
- Capacity: 6 Rounds
- Barrel Length: 2, 3, 4 and 6-inch barrels available
- Frame: medium
- Material: stainless steel

== Users ==
- USA
  - Law enforcement in the United States
    - New York Police Department
    - Virginia State Police
    - Delaware State Police
    - Fairfax County Police
