= Smith & Wesson Model 41 =

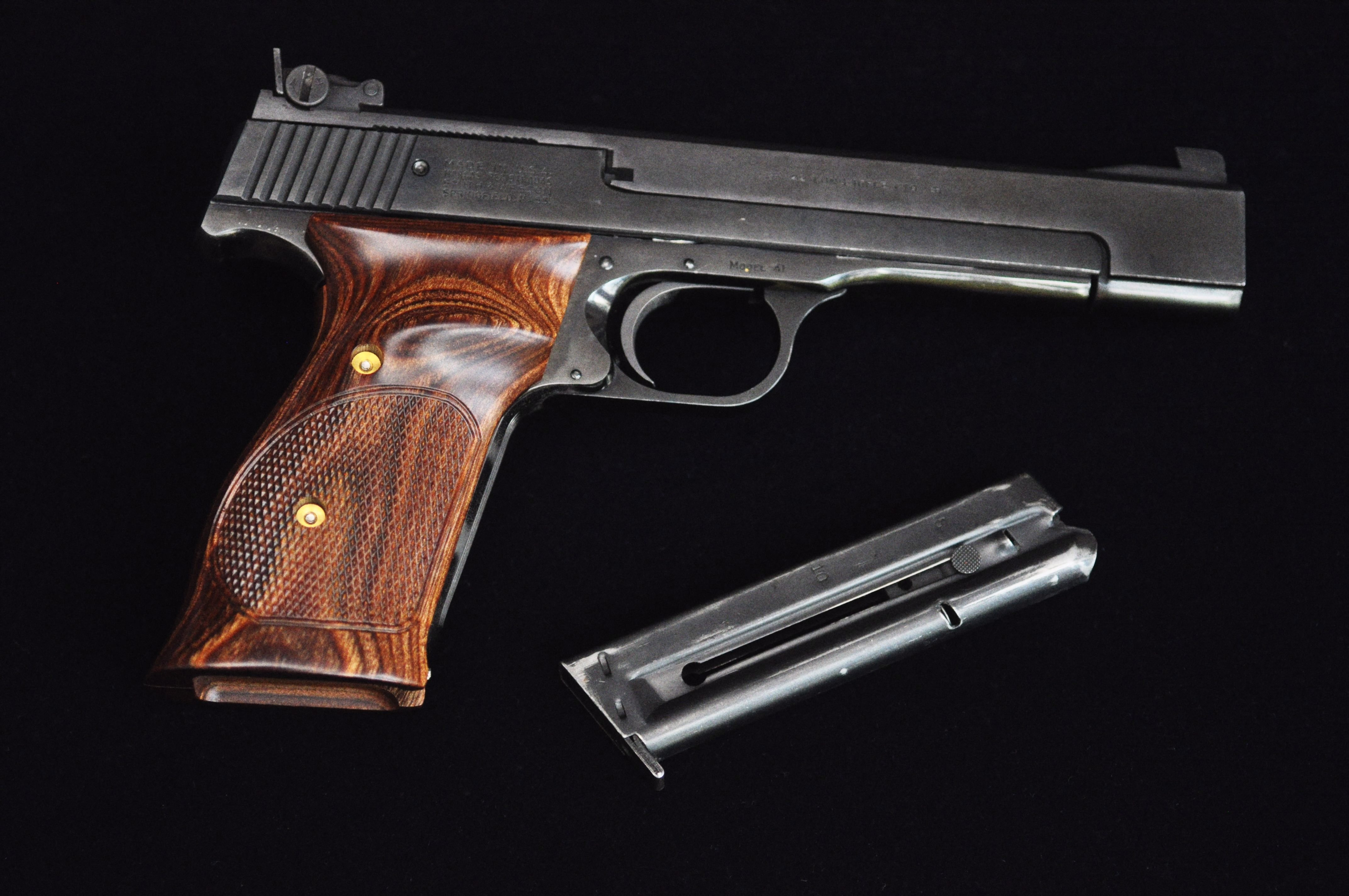
- Smith & Wesson Model 41
- Type: Semi Automatic Pistol
- Place of origin: United States

Specifications
- Mass: 41 ounces (1,200 g)
- Length: 10 1/2 inches (270 mm)
- Barrel length: 5 1/2 inches (140 mm) or 7 inches (180 mm)
- Cartridge: .22 long rifle
- Action: Blowback, single action only
- Rate of fire: Semi-automatic
- Feed system: 10-round single column, detachable box magazine

The Smith & Wesson Model 41 is a semi-automatic pistol by Smith & Wesson introduced after World War II as a competitive target firearm. It was designed with an 18 degree grip angle, the same as the Colt M1911 pistol, to maintain a consistent grip angle.

== Production history ==
In July 1947, two prototypes—numbered X-41 and X-42—were produced, tested, and improved for the next 10 years. In 1957, the Model 41 was made available to the public for sale when Smith & Wesson produced 679 units. At the end of 1958, they had built 9,875 Model 41 pistols. A lighter 5-inch (130 mm) barrel was offered in 1958 for field use. The Model 41-1 was introduced in 1960 and was chambered in .22 Short for International Rapid Fire competition. Only 1000 were made using light aluminum slides necessary for function with the lower powered .22 Short.

In August 1963, the 5-inch heavy barrel version came into the market. Stoeger's Shooter's Bible of 1964 shows a 7 3/8-inch (190 mm) barrel grooved for Olympic center weights. The cocking indicator and 7 3/8-inch barrel were dropped in 1978. The 7-inch (180 mm) barrel was introduced in 1978 with no provision for a muzzle brake. A 6-inch (150 mm) barrel was offered for a few months in 1991. In 1992, the Model 41 was dropped from production. In 1994, Smith & Wesson returned it to production as the Model 41 (New Model).

In August 2025, Smith & Wesson announced that it would end production of the Model 41 by the end of the year.

=== Model 46 ===
In 1957, Smith & Wesson offered a "no frills" version of the Model 41, designated the Model 46. In 1959, it was selected by the U.S. Air Force for basic marksmanship training. About 4000 units were made in total: 2500 with a 7-inch (180 mm) barrel, 1000 with 5-inch (130 mm) barrels, and 500 with 5 1/2-inch (140 mm) barrels. The pistol lacked the checkering, polished blue finish, and other refinements of the Model 41. It proved to be a commercial failure with consumers who preferred the more costly Model 41, and production ceased in 1966.
