= MGP submachine gun =

Peruvian series of 9mm submachine guns

Pistola Ametralladora MGP
- Type: Submachine gun
- Place of origin: Peru

Production history
- Manufacturer: SIMACEFAR

Specifications
- Cartridge: 9×19mm Parabellum
- Action: Blowback
- Feed system: 30 round box magazine
- Sights: Iron

The Peruvian MGP series is a family of 9mm submachine guns and semi-automatic pistols which have been produced by the Peruvian Navy's SIMA CEFAR factory since the 1980s. MGP stands for Marina de Guerra del Peru. Although compact as submachine guns, they are somewhat bulky as pistols.

MGPs are simple blowback designs firing from an open bolt. They are equipped with folding stocks which stabilize the weapon when firing at longer ranges. All versions may be fitted with a suppressor and are meant to use Uzi magazines.

== Variants ==
=== MGP-79/79 A ===
The MGP-79 was the first MGP SMG developed from 1979 to 1985, adopted by Peruvian security forces including police and military. The barrel can be removed and replaced by a barrel/silencer assembly for covert missions. In addition, the front end of the receiver has a threaded portion, which is used to mount a perforated barrel jacket to allow the operator to aim the weapon better.

Its butt can be folded to the front in order to provide extra grip.

==== MGP-87 ====
The MGP-87 is an updated version of the MGP-79A, developed in 1987. It was made more compact than its predecessor. Like the MGP-79A, the barrel can be unscrewed and replaced by a combined barrel and silencer assembly for covert operations.

== See also ==
- BXP

== Bibliography ==
- Hogg, Ian (2000). Jane's Guns Recognition Guide Second Edition. Glasgow: Janes. ISBN 0-00-472453-4.
