= Smith & Wesson Model 645 =

Semi-automatic pistol

- Type: Semi-automatic pistol
- Place of origin: United States

Production history
- Manufacturer: Smith & Wesson
- Produced: 1985–1988

Specifications
- Mass: 2.3 lbs (1.06 kg)
- Cartridge: .45 ACP
- Caliber: .451 in (11.45 mm)
- Action: Double Action/Single Action
- Effective firing range: 165 ft (50 m)
- Feed system: 8-round detachable box magazine (+1 in chamber)
- Sights: Fixed iron three-dot, adjustable available

The Smith & Wesson 645 and Smith & Wesson 745 are second-generation semi-automatic pistols which predate Smith & Wesson's 4500 series of handguns. The S&W 645/745 is chambered for the .45 ACP cartridge. The S&W 645 is constructed almost entirely from stainless steel and is thus extremely resistant to harsh weather conditions, whereas the S&W 745 has a stainless steel frame and a blued carbon steel slide. The S&W 645 was introduced in 1985 and discontinued in 1988. The S&W 745 was produced from 1986 to 1990, primarily as a single-action competition gun for IPSC shooting.

== History ==
Smith & Wesson (S&W) began experiments with .45 ACP-firing pistols in 1984, and produced their first one, the Model 645, in 1985. Public demand led to the development of this series. The series is a .45 ACP version of their 9mm Parabellum weapons. They are normally double-action weapons, or what Smith & Wesson refers to as a traditional double action. They generally have a barrel bushing press fitted into the muzzle end of the slide instead of a separate barrel bushing like a 1911 pistol. Like many Smith & Wesson models, each variant was generally in production for only a few years.

The Model 645 was introduced in 1985, and produced until 1988. It has a stainless steel frame and slide, an ambidextrous safety/decocker, a squared trigger guard, and black plastic grip plates.

The Model 745, built from 1986 to 1990, was a single-action target version of the Model 645, with a match barrel, Novak sight (an adjustable rear sight was optional), an adjustable trigger stop, stainless frame, walnut grip panels and blued slide. It does not have ambidextrous controls, but does have a half-cock safety. The pistol is rollmarked "IPSC 10th Anniversary 1976-1986".

Smith & Wesson changed its numbering system with the introduction of its third generation iteration, where a four digit numeral replaced the earlier three digit numeral designators. One of the first in this series was the 4505; this is essentially the 645 with only the safety catch ambidextrous and a blued finish. A Novak Lo-Mount rear sight was installed on a small number of 4505s. It was produced only in 1991. The Smith & Wesson Model 4506, is made of satin finished stainless steel, a Novak Lo-Mount rear sight later in the series, and a Xenoy wrap-around grip with either a straight or arched backstrap. After 1998, the 4506 had a rounded trigger guard profile, which replaced the earlier squared profile inherited from the 645. The 4506 was produced from 1988 to 2001.

The S&W 645 was used in Miami Vice by the detective Sonny Crockett character in seasons 3 and 4 of the TV series.
