= Smith & Wesson =

American firearms and ammunition company

Smith & Wesson Brands, Inc.
- Type: Public
- Traded as: Nasdaq: SWBI
- Industry: Manufacturing; Arms industry
- Founded: 1852; 174 years ago in Springfield, Massachusetts
- Founders: Horace Smith; Daniel B. Wesson
- Headquarters: Maryville, Tennessee, United States
- Key people: Mark P. Smith (president & CEO); Deana L. McPherson (CFO); Robert L. Scott (chairman)
- Products: Firearms and ammunition
- Revenue: ▲US$535.8 million (2024)
- Operating income: ▼US$44.78 million (2024)
- Net income: ▲US$39.61 million (2024)
- Total assets: ▲US$578.0 million (2024)
- Total equity: ▲US$398.2 million (2024)
- Number of employees: ▼1,509 (2023)
- Website: smith-wesson.com
- Footnotes; Financials as of April 30, 2024.

Smith & Wesson Brands, Inc. (S&W) is an American firearm manufacturer headquartered in Maryville, Tennessee, United States.

Smith & Wesson was founded by Horace Smith and Daniel B. Wesson as the "Smith & Wesson Revolver Company" in 1856, after their previous company, also called the "Smith & Wesson Company" and later renamed as "Volcanic Repeating Arms", was sold to Oliver Winchester and became the Winchester Repeating Arms Company. The modern Smith & Wesson had been previously owned by Bangor Punta and Tomkins plc before being acquired by Saf-T-Hammer Corporation in 2001. Smith & Wesson was a unit of American Outdoor Brands Corporation from 2016 to 2020 until the company was spun out in 2020.

== History ==
=== Volcanic Repeating Arms ===
Horace Smith and Daniel B. Wesson founded the Smith & Wesson Company in Norwich, Connecticut in 1852 to develop the Volcanic rifle. Smith developed a new Volcanic Cartridge, which he patented in 1854. The Smith & Wesson Company was renamed Volcanic Repeating Arms in 1855 and was purchased by Oliver Winchester. Smith left the company and returned to his native Springfield, Massachusetts, while Wesson stayed as plant manager with Volcanic Repeating Arms for eight months. Volcanic Repeating Arms was insolvent in late 1856, after which it was reorganized as the New Haven Arms Company in April 1857, and eventually as the Winchester Repeating Arms Company by 1866.

=== Smith & Wesson Revolver Company ===
As Samuel Colt's patent on the revolver was set to expire in 1856, Wesson began developing a prototype for a cartridge revolver. His research pointed out that a former Colt employee named Rollin White held the patent for a "bored-through" cylinder, a component he would need for his invention. Wesson reconnected with Smith, and the two partners approached White to manufacture a newly designed revolver-and-cartridge combination. After Wesson left Volcanic Repeating Arms in 1856, he rejoined Smith to form the Smith & Wesson Revolver Company, which would become the modern Smith & Wesson company.

Rather than make White a partner in their company, Smith & Wesson paid him a royalty of $0.25 on every revolver they made. This arrangement left White responsible for defending his patent, which eventually led to his financial ruin, while it was very advantageous for Smith & Wesson.

=== 19th century ===
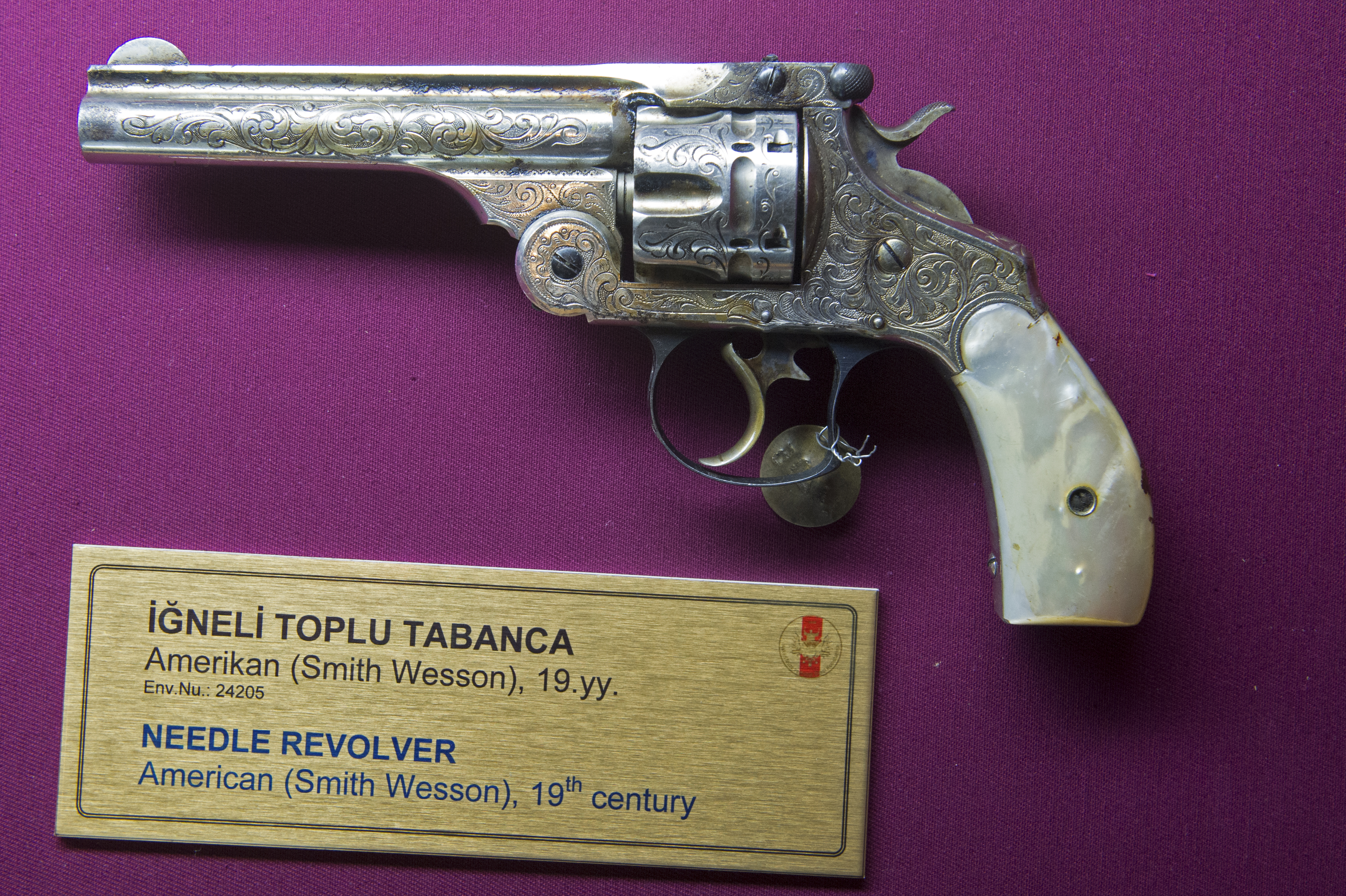
Smith Wesson, 19th century displayed at Istanbul Military Museum, Istanbul, Turkey

Smith & Wesson's revolvers came into popular demand with the outbreak of the American Civil War, as soldiers from all ranks on both sides of the conflict made private purchases of the revolvers for self-defense.

The orders for the Smith & Wesson Model 1 revolver outpaced the factory's production capabilities. In 1860, demand volume exceeded the production capacity, so Smith & Wesson expanded into a new facility and began experimenting with a new cartridge design more suitable than the .22 Short that it had been using.

At the same time, the company's design was being infringed upon by other manufacturers, which led to numerous lawsuits filed by Rollin White. In many of these instances, part of the restitution came in the form of the offender being forced to stamp "Manufactured for Smith & Wesson" on the revolvers in question.

White's vigorous defense of his patent caused a problem for arms makers in the United States at the time, as they could not manufacture cartridge revolvers. At the war's end, the U.S. Government charged White with causing the retardation of arms development in America.

Demand for revolvers declined at the close of the Civil War, so Smith & Wesson focused on developing arms suitable for use on the American frontier. In 1870, the company switched focus from pocket-sized revolvers to a large frame revolver in heavier calibers (.44 S&W American). The U.S. Army adopted this new design, known as the Smith & Wesson Model 3, as the first cartridge-firing revolver in U.S. service.

In 1899, Smith & Wesson introduced its most widely used revolver, the .38 Military & Police (also known as the Smith & Wesson Model 10). With over 6 million produced, it became the standard sidearm of American police officers for much of the 20th century. An additional 1 million of these guns were made for the U.S. Military during World War II.

=== 20th century ===
The post-war periods in the 20th century were times of great innovation for the company. In 1935, Smith & Wesson released the .357 Registered Magnum, which was the first revolver chambered for .357 Magnum. It was designed as a more powerful handgun for law enforcement officers. The Registered Magnum started the "Magnum Era" of handguns. In 1957, when S&W started issuing model numbers to its revolvers, the revolver that had started as the Registered (and later the postwar .357 Magnum) became the Model 27. The high point was in 1955, when the company created the Smith & Wesson Model 29 chambered in .44 Magnum, after the round's creator Elmer Keith had encouraged Smith & Wesson to develop a revolver for his new ammunition. The Dirty Harry movies made this gun a cultural icon two decades later.

In 1965, the Wesson family sold its controlling interest in Smith & Wesson to Bangor Punta, a prominent American conglomerate. Over the next decade, Bangor Punta diversified the company's civilian sales to include related gun products (such as holsters), as well as offering additional police equipment (such as handcuffs and breathalyzers). By the late 1970s, these profitable moves made Smith & Wesson "the envy of the industry" according to Business Week.

Despite these advantages, Smith & Wesson's market share began declining in the 1980s. As the war on drugs intensified in the United States, police departments all across the country replaced their Smith & Wesson revolvers with European semiautomatics (such as Glock, SIG Sauer, and Beretta). From 1982 to 1986, profits at the company declined by 41 percent.

In June 1987, Tomkins plc paid $112.5 million to purchase Smith & Wesson. Tomkins modernized the production equipment and instituted additional testing, which significantly increased product quality. However, new gun sales in the United States lagged in the 1990s, some of which were attributed to the Federal Assault Weapons Ban of 1994. There were also numerous city and state lawsuits against Smith & Wesson. After the success of the Tobacco Master Settlement Agreement, municipalities thought they might be able to succeed through tort law against the gun industry as well.

=== 21st century ===
==== Clinton agreement ====
On March 17, 2000, Smith & Wesson made an agreement with U.S. President Bill Clinton, under which it would implement changes in the design and distribution of its firearms, in return for "preferred buying program" to offset the loss of revenue as a result of the anticipated consumer boycott. The agreement stated all authorized dealers and distributors of Smith & Wesson's products had to abide by a "code of conduct" to eliminate the sale of firearms to prohibited persons, and dealers had to agree to not allow children under 18 (without an adult present) access to gun shops or sections of stores that contained firearms.

In response, the National Rifle Association of America (NRA) and National Shooting Sports Foundation (NSSF) organized a campaign over the issue of smart guns. Thousands of retailers and tens of thousands of firearms consumers boycotted Smith & Wesson. CEO Ed Schultz, who negotiated the deal, was forced out in September of that year. By December 2000, the company's stock price was 19 cents per share. Smith & Wesson dropped its smart gun plans after nearly being driven out of business.

==== Acquisition ====
On May 11, 2001, Saf-T-Hammer Corporation acquired Smith & Wesson Corp. from Tomkins plc for US$15 million, a fraction of the US$112 million originally paid by Tomkins. Saf-T-Hammer assumed US$30 million in debt, bringing the total purchase price to US$45 million. Saf-T-Hammer, a manufacturer of firearms locks and other safety products, purchased the company with the intention of incorporating its line of security products into all Smith & Wesson firearms in compliance with the 2000 agreement.

The acquisition of Smith & Wesson was chiefly brokered by Saf-T-Hammer President Bob Scott, who had left Smith & Wesson in 1999 because of a disagreement with Tomkins's policies. After the purchase, Scott became the president of Smith & Wesson to guide the 157-year-old company back to its former standing in the market.

On February 15, 2002, the name of the newly formed entity was changed to Smith & Wesson Holding Corporation.

==== Post-acquisition ====
In 2006, Smith & Wesson refocused its marketing on big box retailers, according to Smith & Wesson CEO Mike Golden in a 2008 conference call with investors.

On November 7, 2016, Smith & Wesson Holding Corporation changed its name to American Outdoor Brands Corporation. The next years saw increased scrutiny by some due to the use of its firearms in mass shootings such as the 2018 Stoneman Douglas High School shooting, in which a Smith & Wesson AR-15 style rifle, the semi-automatic M&P15 was used. The same weapon was used in the 2015 San Bernardino attack, as well as the 2012 Aurora, Colorado, shooting.

In 2017, Smith & Wesson saw a severe contraction in its sales as units shipped to distributors and retailers declined 38.3%. The company was forced to lay off one-fourth of its manufacturing workforce.

On August 24, 2020, American Outdoor Brands was spun-off from Smith & Wesson, with S&W retaining the stock ticker SWBI and American Outdoor Brands becoming a new publicly traded company on the NASDAQ as American Outdoor Brands, Inc.

As of January 2022, SWBI had a market value of around $880 million, with revenues a little over US$1 billion.

== Products ==
=== Cartridges ===
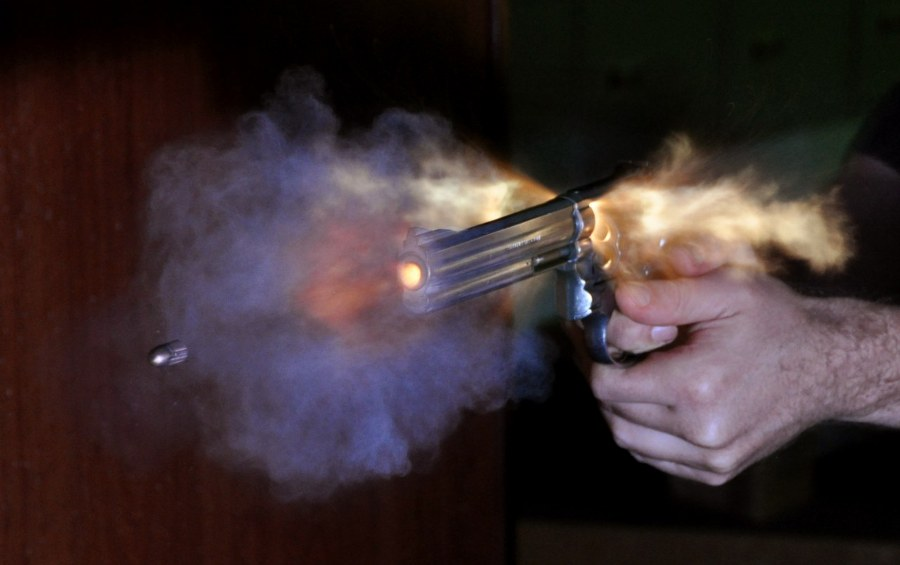
Bullet coming from a Smith & Wesson 686 .357 Magnum, taken with an air-gap flash

- .22 Short — Based on the original .22 Black Powder Rimfire cartridge that the Model 1 was chambered in, but with a much more powerful smokeless powder charge.
- .32 S&W — Sometimes called .32 S&W Short
- .32 S&W Long — Sometimes called .32 Colt New Police (a variation produced for the Colt New Police Revolver, as Colt did not want an association with their competitor)
- .32-44 S&W, defined as .32 Caliber (true .32 caliber measures .323"), sole use in Model 3 Revolver to 1898.
- .38 S&W — Sometimes called .38 Colt New Police (a variation produced for the Colt New Police Revolver, as Colt did not want an association with their competitor) and the 38/200 in England.
- .38-44 S&W — There are two distinct loads with this designation. The first was intended for use in model 3 revolvers up to 1898. The second was a predecessor to the .357 Magnum. Using the latter load in a pre-1898 gun could cause serious injury.
- .38 S&W Special — Usually referred to as ".38 Special"
- .357 S&W Magnum — Usually referred to as ".357 Magnum"
- .40 S&W — Smith & Wesson developed the cartridge for the FBI, with releasing it and the Model 4006 pistol in 1990. Glock also released a pistol in .40, which, ironically, was adopted by the FBI in 1997
- .41 Remington Magnum — While Remington Arms developed the ammunition, Smith & Wesson made the first revolvers to chamber the cartridge.
- .44 American
- .44 Russian – was the first commercially successful centerfire handgun cartridge that used an internally lubricated non-heeled bullet design.
- .44 S&W Special
- .44 Remington Magnum
- .45 S&W Schofield
- .460 S&W Magnum
- .500 S&W Magnum — designed to be the most powerful handgun in the world

=== Early handguns and revolvers ===
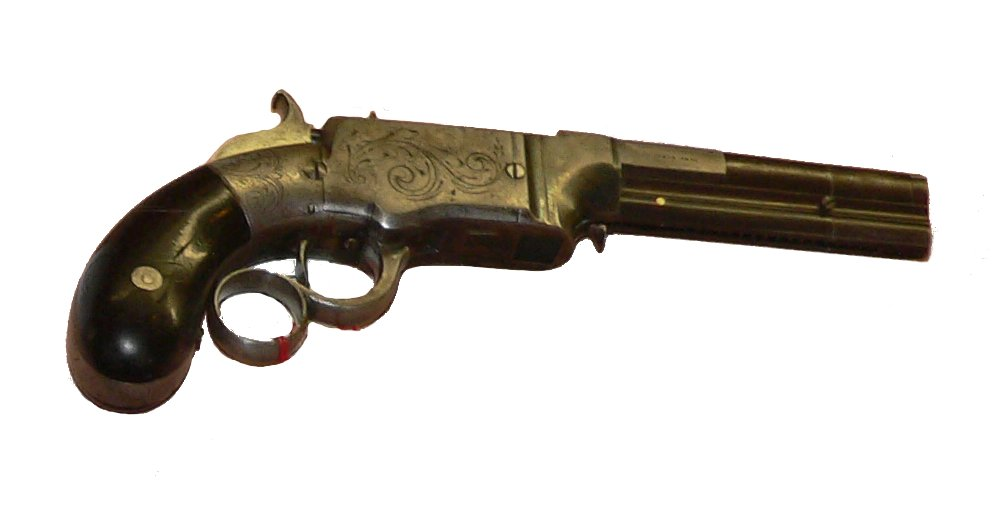
Smith & Wesson Volcanic, caliber .31, between 1854 and 1855

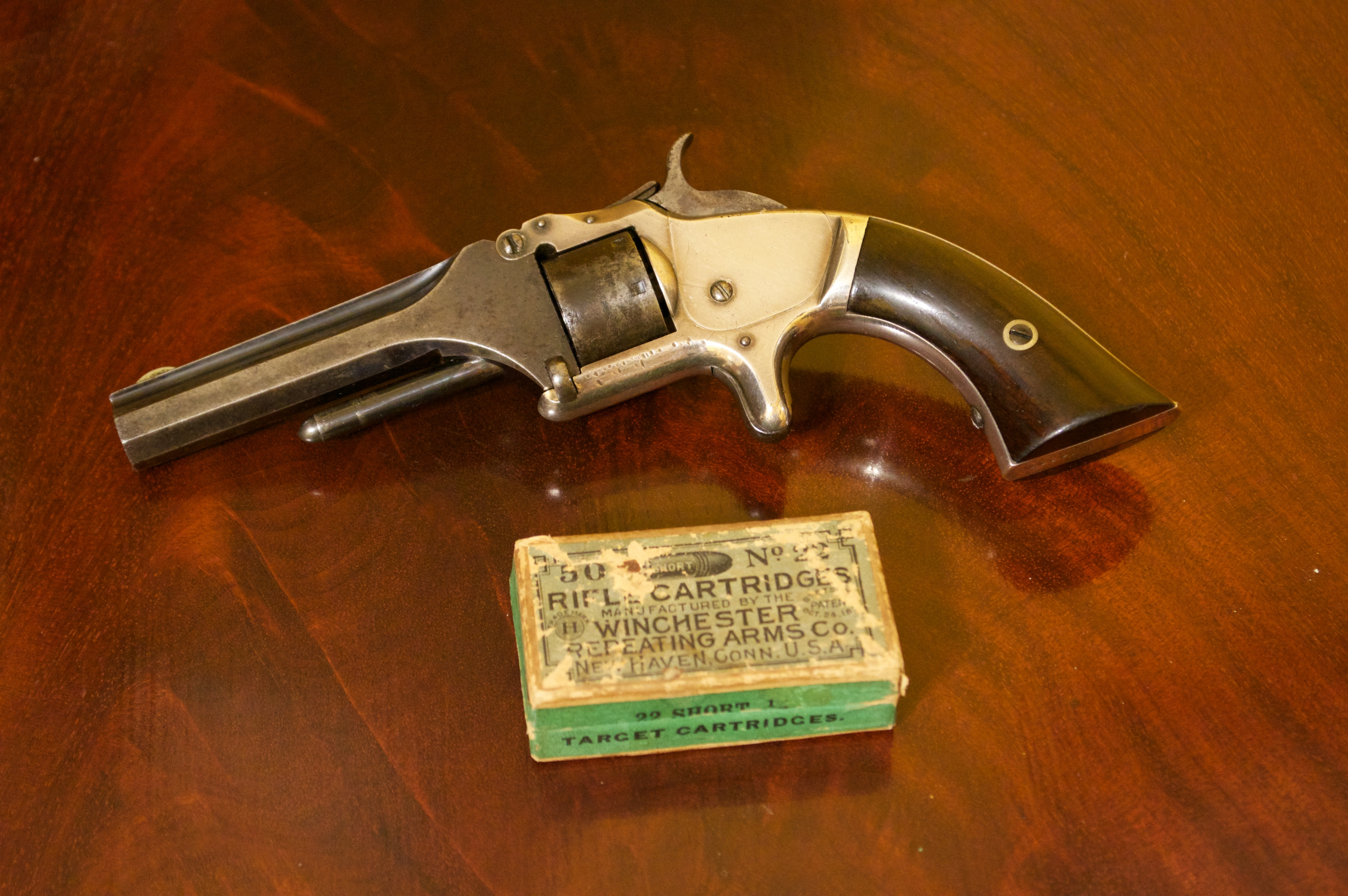
Smith & Wesson Model 1 Second Issue, .22 rimfire

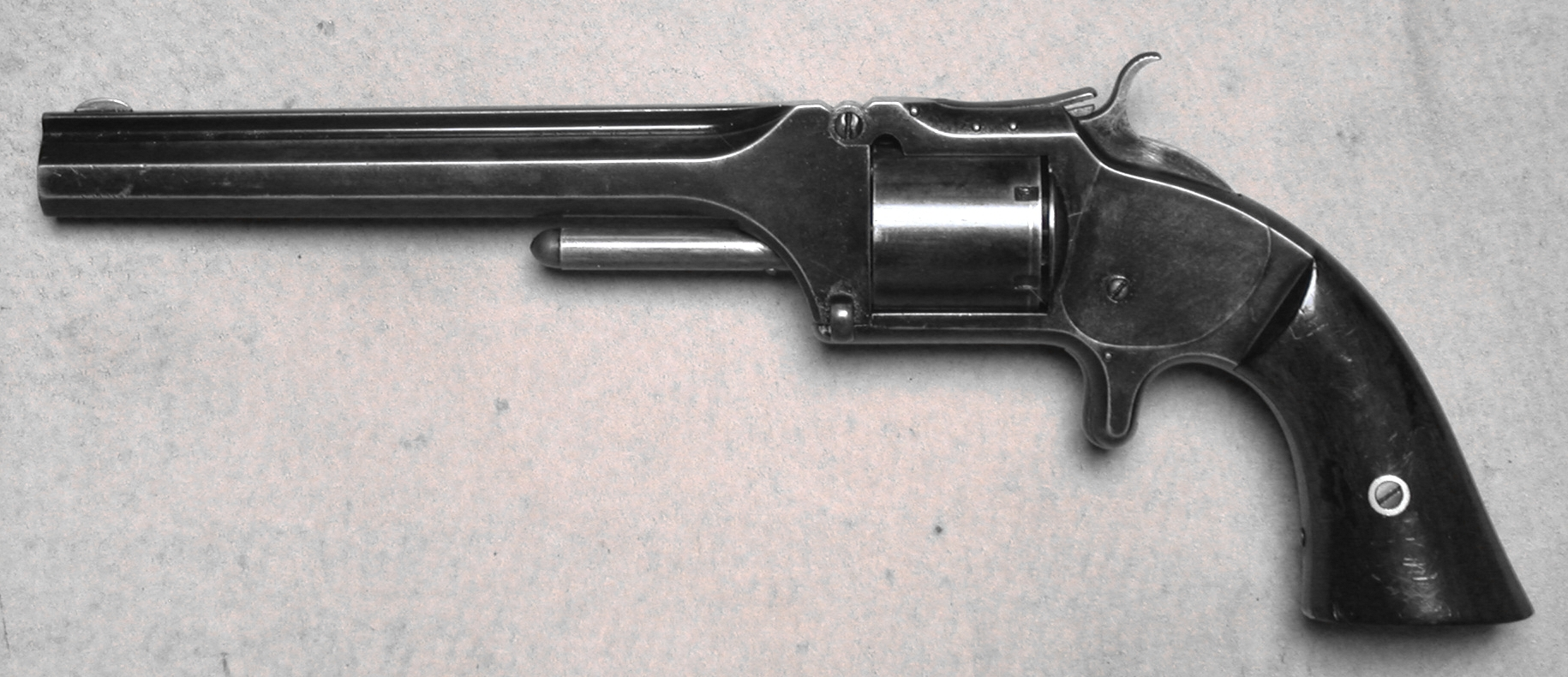
Smith & Wesson Army No 2, made 1863, caliber .32 Rimfire

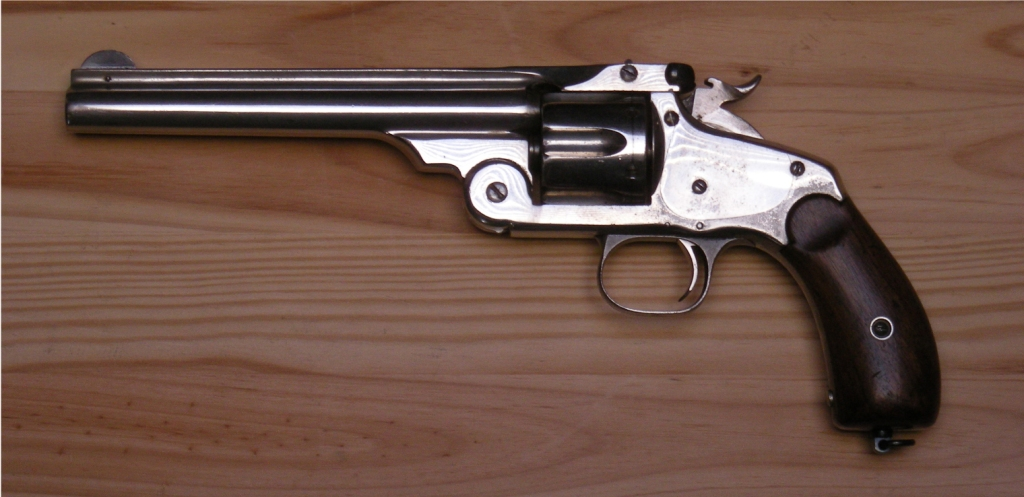
Smith & Wesson No. 3, New Model, 44 Russian

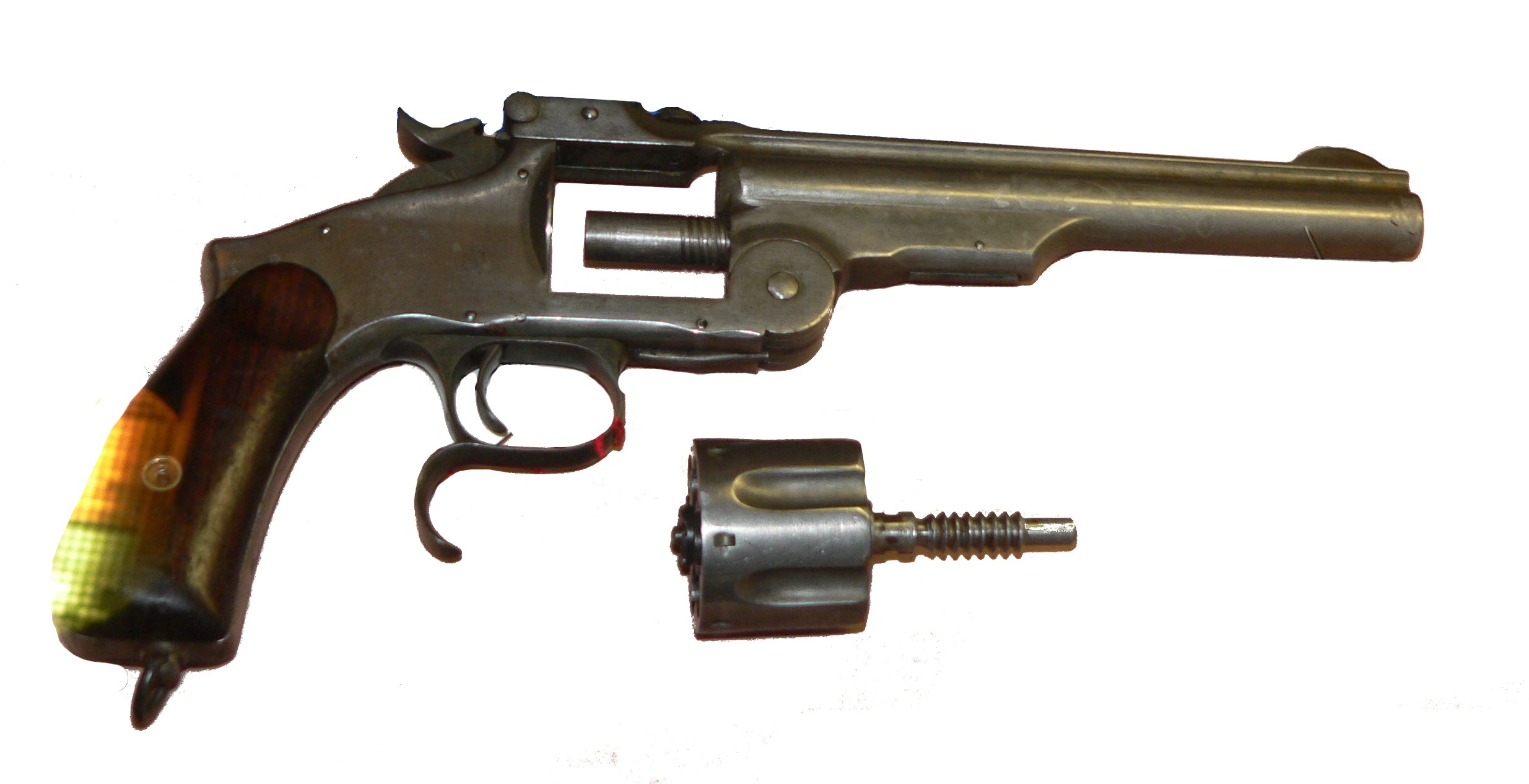
Smith & Wesson Model 3, Cal. .44, between 1874 and 1878

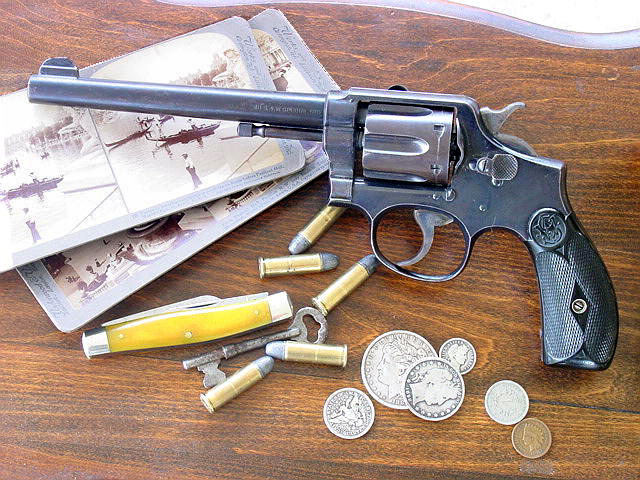
Smith & Wesson .38 Special Model 1899 Military and Police Hand Ejector

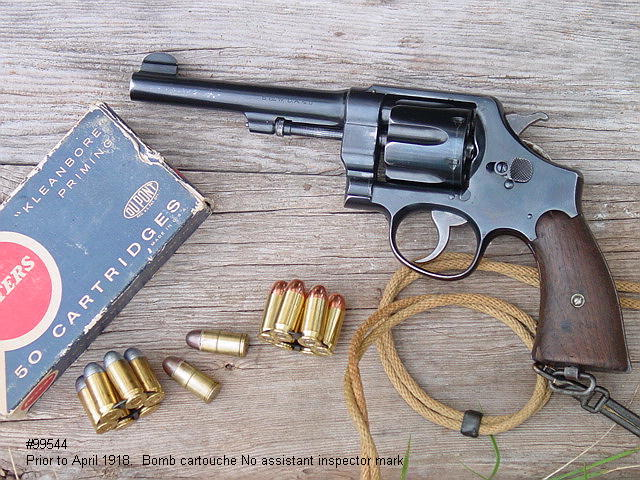
Smith & Wesson M1917 cal. 45

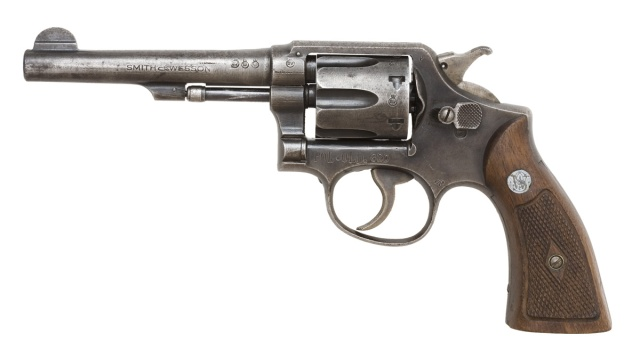
Smith & Wesson Model 10 cal. 38

Smith & Wesson has produced revolvers over the years in several standard frame sizes. M refers to the small early Ladysmith frame, I to the small .32 frame, J to the small .38 frame, K to the medium .38 frame, L to the medium large .38 and .44 Magnum frame, and N to the largest .44 Magnum type frame. In 2003, the even larger X frame was introduced for the .500 S&W Magnum.

Tip-up models

- Smith & Wesson Model 1
- Smith & Wesson Model 1 1/2
- Smith & Wesson Model No. 2 Army

Top-break models

- S&W .38 Single Action—first Smith & Wesson revolver chambered in .38 caliber.
- Smith & Wesson Model 3—first automatic ejection of spent cartridge cases
- Smith & Wesson Double Action
- Smith & Wesson Safety Hammerless—The "lemon squeezer", also known as the Model 40, Model 42 and 38 Safety.

I-frame (small) models

- Smith & Wesson Model 30—A small six-shot .32-caliber revolver.
- Smith & Wesson Model 32—"Terrier" A small five-shot revolver chambered in .38 S&W .38-caliber. Coil or flat mainspring, round front sight, 2" barrel.
- Smith & Wesson Model 34 Kit Gun is a small, 6-shot, .22 Long Rifle, double-action revolver made by Smith & Wesson. It's a multi-purpose utility handgun, intended to be used for small game hunting, plinking, and pest control. It was designed to be easily packed in a hunting, camping or fishing "kit". The Model 34 would be upgraded into a J-frame in 1960.

J-frame (small) models

- Smith & Wesson Model 36—known as the "Chiefs Special"; first J-frame (1950), 5-shot revolver.
- Smith & Wesson Model 37—known as the "Chiefs Special Airweight".
- Smith & Wesson Model 60—first regular production all stainless steel revolver (1965); the stainless Chief's Special.
- Smith & Wesson Model 340PD—first revolver made of scandium alloy, very light, possibly the final evolution of the classic J-frame Chief's Special introduced over 60 years earlier, weighs 12 ounces (340 g).
- Smith & Wesson Model 351PD - A 7-Shot .22 Magnum revolver with a 2” barrel, the frame and cylinder are made from lightweight alloy.
- Smith & Wesson Model 617—An 8-shot .22 L.R. revolver with 3" barrel, the frame and cylinder are made from lightweight alloy.
- Smith & Wesson Bodyguard—standard and "Airweight" (Models 38, 49, 438, 638, 649).
- Smith & Wesson Centennial—standard and "Airweight" (Models 40, 42, 442, 640, 642); at one time available in 9×19mm caliber as the Model 940.

K-frame (medium) models

- Smith & Wesson Model 10—.38 Special. Previously the ".38 Military & Police" and ".38 Victory Model"
- Smith & Wesson Model 11—.38 S&W. Previously the ".38 Regular Military & Police"
- Smith & Wesson Model 12—.38 Special. "Airweight" (alloy frame) version of the Model 10.
- Smith & Wesson Model 13—.357 Magnum version of the heavy barrel Model 10.
- Smith & Wesson Model 14—.38 Special. Previously the "K-38 Masterpiece".
- Smith & Wesson Model 15—.38 Special. Previously the "38 Combat Masterpiece".
- Smith & Wesson Model 16—.32 S&W Long Caliber. Previously the "K-32 Masterpiece".
- Smith & Wesson Model 17—.22 Caliber. Previously the "K-22 Masterpiece".
- Smith & Wesson Model 18—.22 Caliber. Previously the "22 Combat Masterpiece".
- Smith & Wesson Model 19—.357 Magnum. Previously the "Combat Magnum"; first lightweight .357 Magnum, built at the request of Bill Jordan
- Smith & Wesson Model 48—Blued steel .22 Magnum.
- Smith & Wesson Model 53—blued steel .22 Magnum, built for .22 Remington Jet Center fire Magnum ammunition.
- Smith & Wesson Model 64—.38 Special. Stainless steel version of the Model 10.
- Smith & Wesson Model 65—.357 Magnum. Stainless steel version of the Model 13
- Smith & Wesson Model 66—.357 Magnum. Stainless steel version of the Model 19.
- Smith & Wesson Model 67—.38 Special. Stainless steel version of the Model 15.
- Smith & Wesson Model 68—.38 Special version of the Model 66 (half-lug) 6" barrel.
- Smith & Wesson Model 617—.22 Caliber. Full-lug, Stainless steel, 10-shot version of the Model 17.

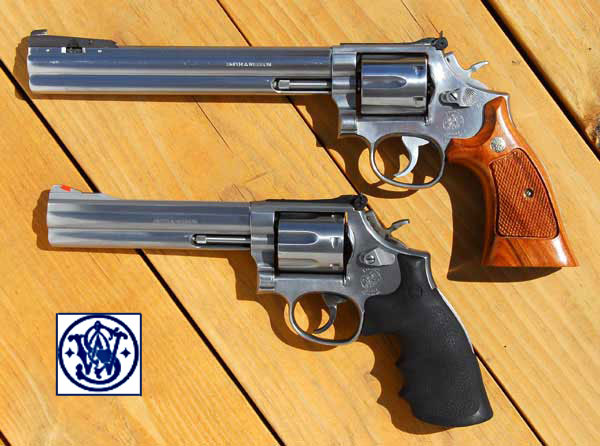
Two Smith & Wesson models 686

L-frame (medium-large) models

- Smith & Wesson Model 386—alloy
- Smith & Wesson Model 586—blued steel
- Smith & Wesson Model 686—stainless steel
- Smith & Wesson Model 686+—Same frame as the 686 but with a 7-shot cylinder.
- Smith & Wesson Model 619—7-shot .357 Magnum, no full underlug, fixed sights.
- Smith & Wesson Model 620—7-shot .357 Magnum, no full underlug, adjustable sights.
- Smith & Wesson Model 646—stainless steel .40 S&W, adjustable sights
- Smith & Wesson Model 69—stainless steel .44 Remington Magnum with 5-round capacity, available in two barrel lengths.

M-frame (extra small old) models

- Smith & Wesson Ladysmith—Ladysmith in .22 Long.

N-frame (large) models (formerly S-frame)

- .44 Hand Ejector First Model "New Century"—first N-frame, introduced in 1908. The first chambering of .44 S&W Special.
- Model 1917—first revolver chambered for .45 ACP
- Smith & Wesson Model 22—.45 ACP/.45 Auto Rim; also called the M1950 Military; Base for the 2nd issue Thunder Ranch Revolver; This was the evolution of the M1917 revolver.
- Smith & Wesson Model 24—The original .44 Special Hand Ejector was renamed the Model 24, since discontinued.
- Smith & Wesson Model 25—similar to the Model 29, but chambered for the .45 ACP/.45 Auto Rim and later, the .45 Colt cartridge. The best known, and most common, variants of this revolver are the Model 25-2 (.45 ACP) and Model 25-5 (.45 Colt).
- Smith & Wesson Model 27—first .357 Magnum; usually a custom or limited-run revolver, with a deep blue lustre
- Smith & Wesson Model 28—"Highway Patrolman" .357 Magnum; fewer frills than the Model 27, same performance; marketed to police for its reduced price and equal performance.
- Smith & Wesson Model 29—first .44 Magnum by S&W, made famous by its appearance in the film Dirty Harry
- Smith & Wesson Model 57—first .41 Magnum; initiated and sponsored by Elmer Keith and others, top end premier model identical in features, fit, and finish to .44 Magnum Model 29.
- Smith & Wesson Model 58—.41 Magnum; 4-inch barrel with fixed sights; marketed as basic, entry-level police duty revolver offering greater power than .38/.357 revolvers when using a reduced power .41 Magnum police load.
- Smith & Wesson Model 610. A 6-shot revolver chambered for the 10mm Auto cartridge.
- Smith & Wesson Model 625—used by Jerry Miculek in .45 ACP to set the world record for 12 rounds (with one reload) on target in 2.99 seconds
- Smith & Wesson Model 627—8-shot .357 Magnum, adjustable sights, stainless steel, 2.5" or 5" barrel, removable compensator, Performance Center.
- Smith & Wesson Model 629—6-shot .44 Magnum, adjustable sights, stainless steel, 2.5", 4" or 6" barrel.

X-frame models

- Smith & Wesson Model 350 7-shot .350 Legend
- Smith & Wesson Model 460 5-shot .460 S&W Magnum
- Smith & Wesson Model 500 5-shot .500 S&W Magnum — designed to be the most powerful handgun in the world

Z-frame models

- Smith & Wesson Governor

Most Smith & Wesson revolvers have been equipped with an internal locking mechanism since the acquisition by Saf-T-Hammer. The mechanism is relatively unobtrusive, is activated with a special key, and renders the firearm inoperable. Most gun enthusiasts prefer to keep their gun unlocked.

=== Semi-automatic pistols ===
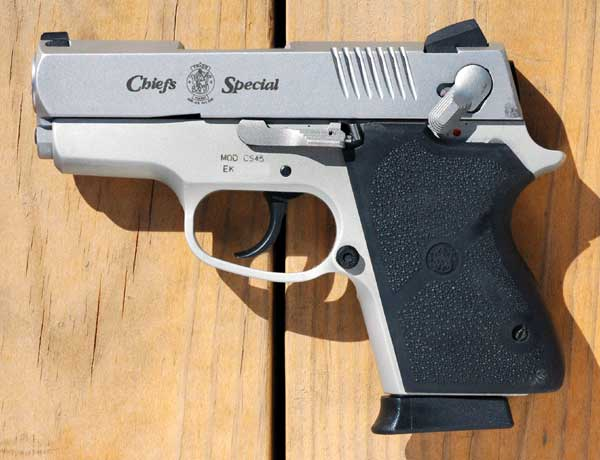
.45 Semi-auto Chief's Special

In 1953, the U.S. Army was looking for a pistol to replace the Colt 1911A1. To obtain a bid from the U.S. Government, Smith & Wesson began working on a design similar to the German Walther P38. A year later, the Army dropped its search and Smith & Wesson introduced its pistol to the civilian shooting market as the Model 39.

The Model 39 would come to be known as a first-generation pistol. Since the Model 39 debuted, Smith & Wesson continuously developed this design into its third-generation pistols, which have now been discontinued. The first-generation models use a 2-digit model number, the second generation use 3 digits, and third-generation models use 4 digits.

- Smith & Wesson Bodyguard 380
- Smith & Wesson Model 22A
- Smith & Wesson SW22 Victory
- Smith & Wesson Model 39—first U.S.-designed double-action pistol in 9×19mm
- Smith & Wesson Model 41
- Smith & Wesson Model 52
- Smith & Wesson Model 59—S&W's first high-capacity double-action pistol in 9 mm Parabellum
- Smith & Wesson Model 61—Debuting in 1970, the pocket 'Escort' was a tiny automatic .22LR pistol, designed to be cheap and easily concealable. It was available in blued or nickel-plated with black or white plastic grips. Production stopped in 1973.
- Smith & Wesson Model 78G
- Smith & Wesson Model 1913 also known as Model 35
- Smith & Wesson Model 422
- Smith & Wesson Model 439— updated model 39
- Smith & Wesson Model 459—S&W's entry into the US Army's XM9 program
- Smith & Wesson Model 469
- Smith & Wesson Model 645 second-generation large frame semi-auto in .45 ACP
- Smith & Wesson 539
- Smith & Wesson Model 908
- Smith & Wesson Model 909
- Smith & Wesson Model 910
- Smith & Wesson Model 915
- Smith & Wesson Model 945
- Smith & Wesson Model 1006—stainless steel 10mm Auto
- Smith & Wesson Model 1026 with a frame-mounted decocker
- Smith & Wesson Model 4006
- Smith & Wesson Model 4506 third-generation large frame semi-auto in .45 ACP
- Smith & Wesson Model 5906

Along with the myriad smaller configurations, the mid-sized 4516, 457, the Chiefs Special CS45, and the decocker equipped, 4546, 4566 and 4576, and the 45 TSW, the 4553, still being issued to the West Virginia State Troopers.

For many of the second-generation models, the first digit identified the material used in the frame; thus the first digit of 4 indicated an alloy, the first digit of 5 indicated blued steel, and the first digit of 6 indicated stainless steel. For most of the third-generation models, the first two digits identified the caliber (except for 59/69 for 9mm), the last two digits were for the action style and the material, respectively. Action style numbers were typically 0 for the standard double/single-action and 4 for double-action-only. Material numbers were commonly 3 for aluminium, 4 for blued steel, and 6 for stainless steel.

==== Sigma series ====
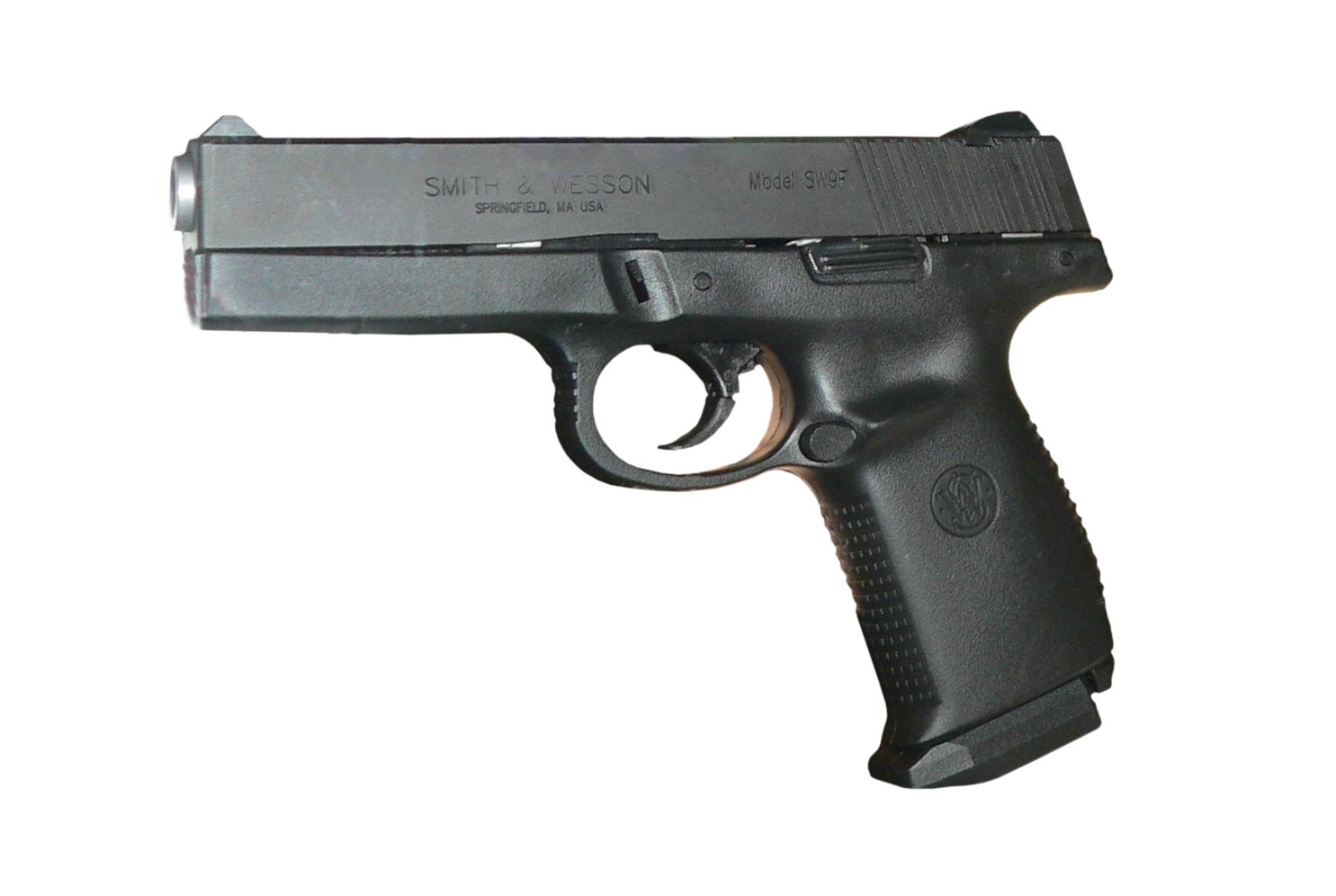
A Sigma pistol

Smith & Wesson introduced the Sigma series of recoil-operated, locked-breech semi-auto pistols in 1994 with the Sigma SW40F, followed by the Sigma SW9F 9mm, which included a 17-shot magazine. Glock initiated a patent infringement lawsuit against Smith & Wesson. The latter paid an undisclosed amount to settle the case and for the right to continue producing models in the Sigma line. The gun frame is manufactured from polymer, while the slide and barrel use either stainless steel or carbon steel. In 1996, Smith & Wesson updated the Sigma by adding a compact model with a shortened barrel (from 4 1/2 to 4 inches) and again, in 1999, modified the series by changing the grip by adding checkering and adding an integral accessory rail for lights and laser targeting devices.

- SW9 in 9×19mm
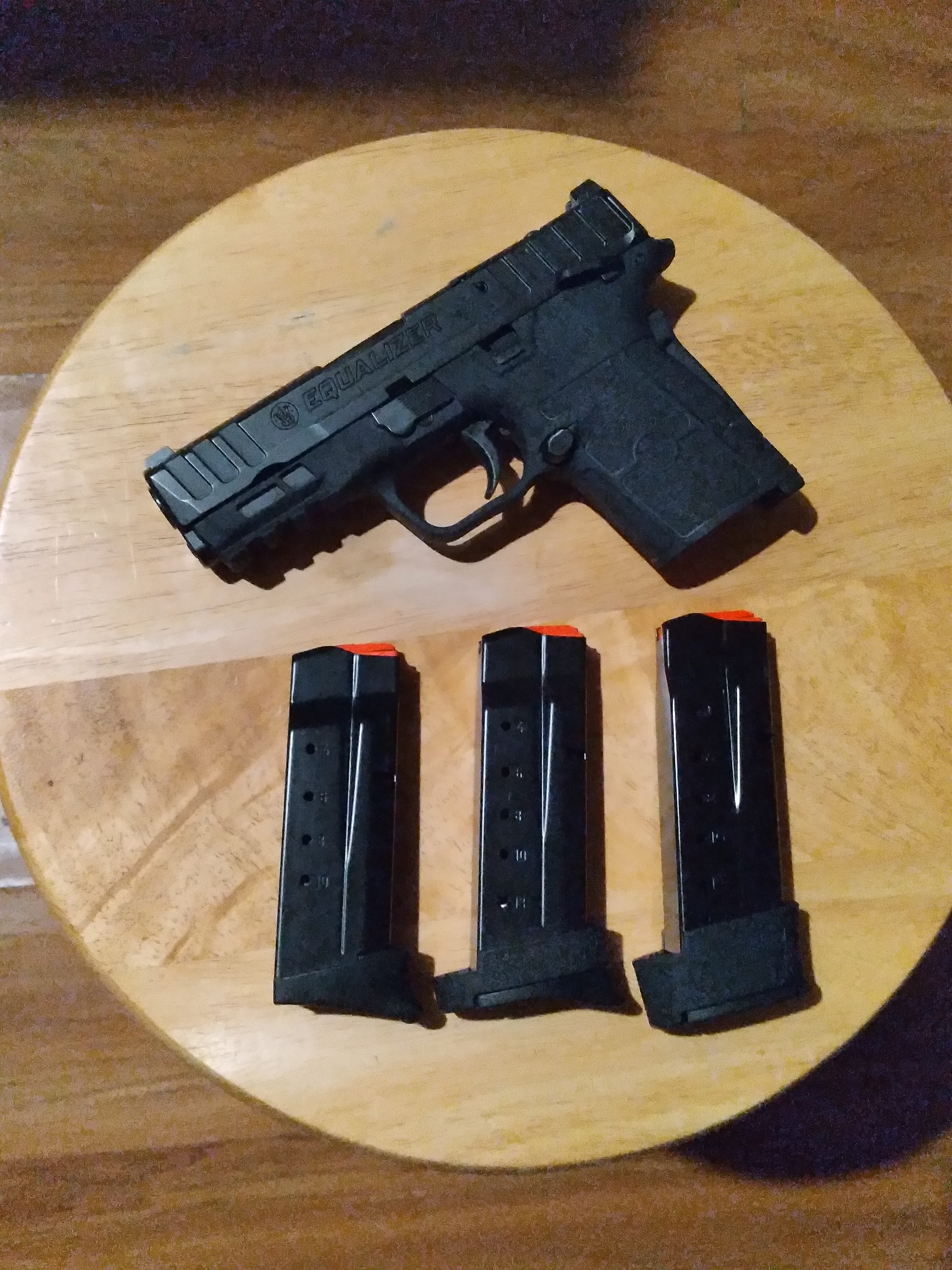
- Smith & Wesson Equalizer in 9x19 with 10, 13, and 15 round magazines
  SW40 in .40 S&W
- SW357V in .357 SIG
- SW380 in .380 ACP

==== SW99 Series ====
S&W reached an agreement with Walther to produce variations of the P99 line of pistols. Branded as the SW99, the pistol is available in several calibers, including 9mm, .40 S&W, and .45 ACP, and in both full size and compact variations. Under the terms of the agreement, Walther produced the frames, and Smith & Wesson produced the slide and barrel. The pistol has several cosmetic differences from the original Walther design and strongly resembles a hybrid between the P99 and the Sigma series.

==== M&P Series ====
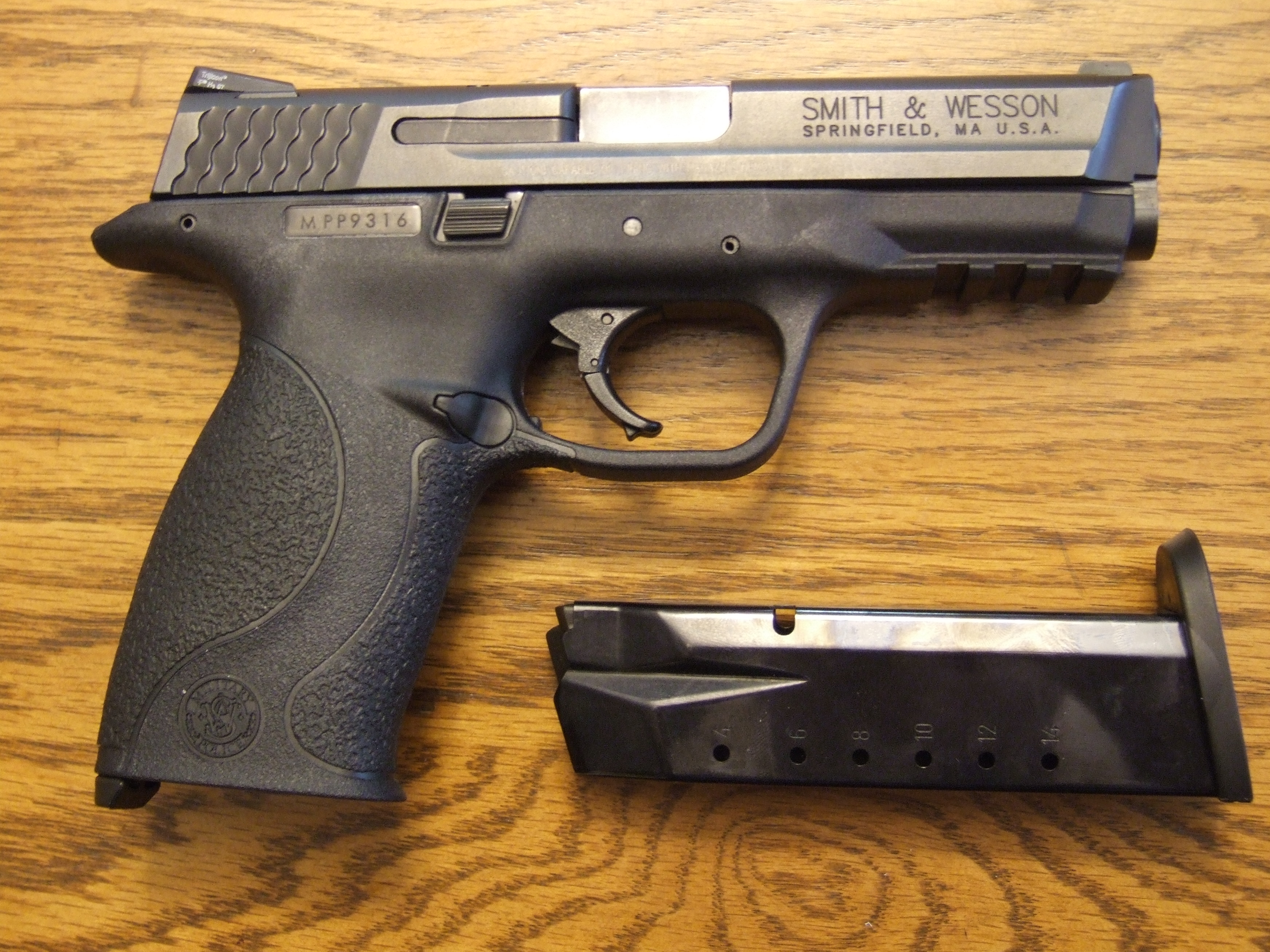
Smith & Wesson M&P pistol

In 2005, Smith & Wesson debuted a new polymer-framed pistol intended for the law enforcement market. Dubbed the M&P (for Military and Police), its name was meant to evoke S&W's history as the firearm of choice for law enforcement agencies through its previous lineup of M&P revolvers. The M&P is a completely new design with no parts interchangeable with any other pistol including the Sigma. The new design not only looks completely different from the Sigma but feels completely different with 3 different backstraps supplied with each M&P. Many of the ergonomic study elements that had been incorporated into the Sigma and the SW99 were brought over to the M&P. The improved trigger weight and feel, and unique takedown method (not requiring a dry pull of the trigger) were meant to set the M&P apart from both the Sigma and the popular Glock pistols.

The M&P is available in 9×19mm, .40 S&W, 5.7x28mm, .22 WMR, and .357 SIG. Also, a .22 LR M&P was developed with Carl Walther and is made in Germany. A .45 ACP model was released in early 2007, after making its debut at the SHOT Show. In addition, compact versions are available in .22LR, 9×19mm, .40 S&W, .357 SIG, and .45 ACP. The .22LR Compact is made by Smith & Wesson in the United States. Subcompact versions are available in 9×19mm, .40 S&W and .45 ACP.

==== SD VE Series ====
Smith & Wesson introduced the SD VE series in 2012 to remake and improve the canceled Smith & Wesson SD. The SD VE design has an improved self-defense trigger and a comfortable, ergonomic, textured grip. The SD VE also features an improved stainless steel barrel and slide that the S.D. did not include. The Smith & Wesson SD VE is available in 9×19mm and .40 S&W calibers in either a standard-capacity version (16+1-round capacity for SD9 VE and 14+1 for SD40 VE) or the low-capacity version (10+1-round capacity for both calibers.)

==== SW1911 Series ====
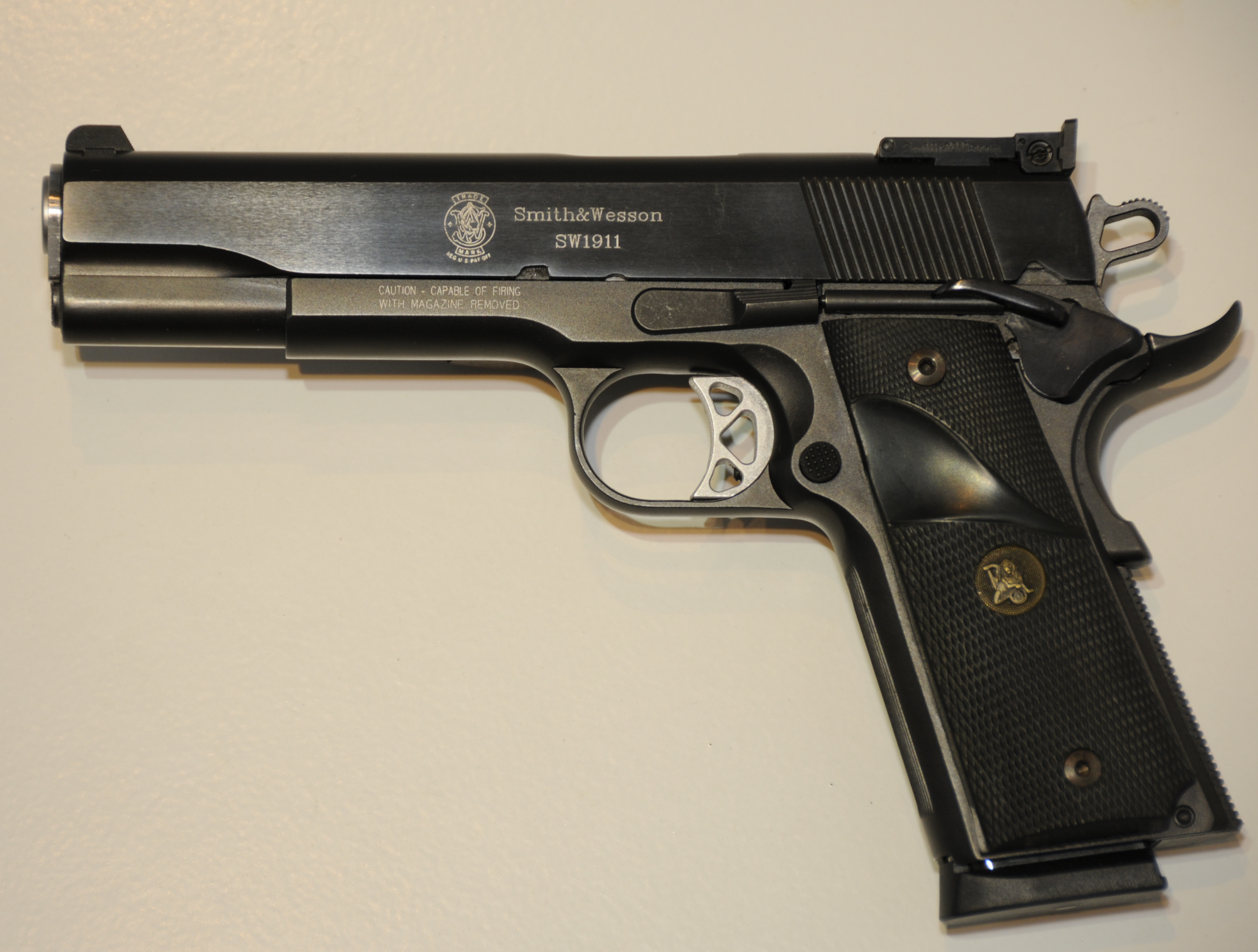
A basic version of Smith & Wesson's SW1911 with user-installed Pachmayr grips

In 2003, Smith & Wesson introduced their variation of the classic M1911 .45 ACP semi-automatic handgun, the SW1911. This firearm retains the M1911's well-known dimensions, operation, and feel while adding a variety of modern touches. Updates to the design include serration at the front of the slide for easier operation and disassembly, a high "beaver-tail" grip safety, external extractor, lighter weight hammer and trigger, as well as updated internal safeties to prevent accidental discharges if dropped. S&W 1911s are available with black finished carbon steel slides and frames or bead blasted stainless slides and frames. They are available with aluminium frames alloyed with scandium in either natural or black finishes. These updates have resulted in a firearm that is true to the M1911 design, with additions that would normally be considered "custom", with a price similar to equivalent designs from other manufacturers.

Smith & Wesson's Performance Center produces the top-of-the-line hand fitted competition version knowns as the P.C. 1911. While most 1911s run around 38 to 39 ounces (1,100 to 1,100 g), the PC 1911 is heavier, at approximately 41 ounces (1,200 g). The full-length guide rod adds some weight, and so does the add-on magazine well.

=== Rifles and carbines ===
During the early years of WW2, Smith & Wesson manufactured batches of the Model 1940 Light Rifle under request from the British Government. It turned out to be a spectacular failure.

In January 2006, Smith & Wesson reentered the rifle market with its M&P15 series of rifles based on the AR-15. Unveiled at SHOT Show 2006, the rifle debuted in two varieties: the M&P15 and the M&P15T. The two are basically the same rifle, chambered in 5.56 NATO, with the T model featuring folding sights and a four-sided accessories rail. These rifles were first produced by Stag Arms but marketed under the Smith & Wesson name. Currently Smith & Wesson makes the lower receiver in-house while the barrel is supplied by Thompson/Center, a S&W company.

In May 2008, Smith & Wesson introduced its first AR-variant rifle in a caliber other than 5.56 NATO. The M&P15R is a standard AR-15 rifle chambered for the 5.45×39mm cartridge. In 2009, it released the M&P15-22, chambered for .22 Long Rifle.

Smith & Wesson manufactured a line of bolt-action rifles called the i-Bolt. These synthetic-stock rifles were available in .25-06, .270 Win, or .30-06 caliber.

In February 2023, Smith & Wesson introduced the M&P FPC carbine in 9mm.

In October 2023, Smith & Wesson introduced the Response AR-15-style pistol-caliber carbine (PPC) chambered in 9mm. It comes equipped with a FLEXMAG System, allowing it to accept different manufacturers' magazines, including Smith & Wesson's M&P magazines and Glock G17/G19 magazines.

In January 2024, Smith & Wesson introduced the Model 1854 lever-action rifle, the first lever-action firearm created by Smith & Wesson in 170 years (since the Volcanic rifle & pistol were patented in 1854).

=== Submachine gun ===
In 1967, Smith & Wesson produced a 9mm submachine gun, hoping to capitalize on U.S. sales of the Israeli Uzi and H.K. MP5. It borrowed the magazine of the Carl Gustaf M/45 submachine gun (Kulsprutepistol m/45 or Kpist m/45, which had been popular with the U.S. forces in Vietnam as the "Swedish K") and made a similar side-folding stock. But the rest of the straight blowback weapon had no parts in common with the earlier Swedish gun. The S&W Model 76 submachine gun was made in limited numbers and was primarily used as a police weapon. Because all of them were made before 1986, many of them made it into civilian hands in the United States and are commonly used in submachine gun competitions.

=== Shotguns ===
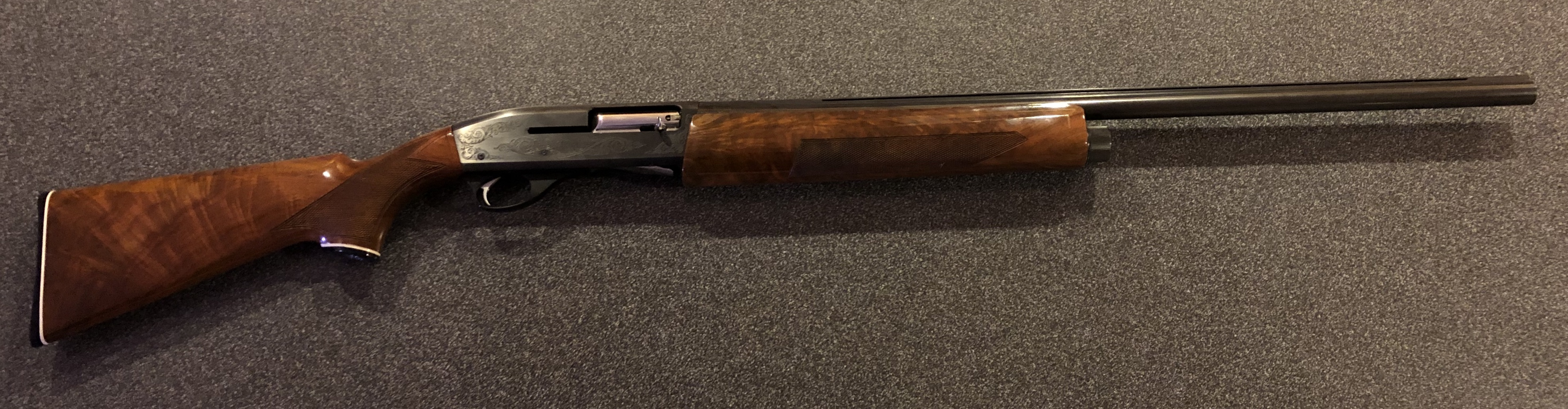
A Model 1000 shotgun

Smith & Wesson bought patents and tooling for a pump-action shotgun design from Noble Manufacturing Co. in 1972 and produced it as the Model 916. The guns were plagued by a variety of quality issues, including a recall due to a safety issue with barrels of the 916T (takedown) version rupturing. The Model 916 was succeeded by the pump-action Model 3000 and the semi-automatic Model 1000; both were produced by Howa Machinery in Japan. However, with the sale of the company to Tomkins plc, Smith & Wesson exited the shotgun market in the mid-1980s to return to their core market of handguns.

During the 1980s, the company released the Smith & Wesson AS, an assault shotgun which had a fully automatic capability.

In November 2006, Smith & Wesson announced that it would reenter the shotgun market with two new lines of shotguns, the break-open Elite Series and the semi-automatic 1000 Series, unveiled at the 2007 SHOT Show. Both series were manufactured in Turkey. Along with the new shotguns, the company debuted the Heirloom Warranty program, a first of its kind in the firearms industry. The warranty provides both the original buyer and the buyer's chosen heir with a lifetime warranty on all Elite Series shotguns. The 1000 Series and Elite Series were both discontinued circa 2010.

In August 2021, S&W announced the first shotgun in its M&P line with the M&P12, a bullpup-style pump-action 12-gauge shotgun. The gun is chambered for 3-inch magnum shells and feeds through two independent magazine tubes. The tubular magazine will accept not only 3-inch magnum shells, but also 2 3/4-inch standard shells, and 1 3/4-inch mini-shells.

=== Other products ===
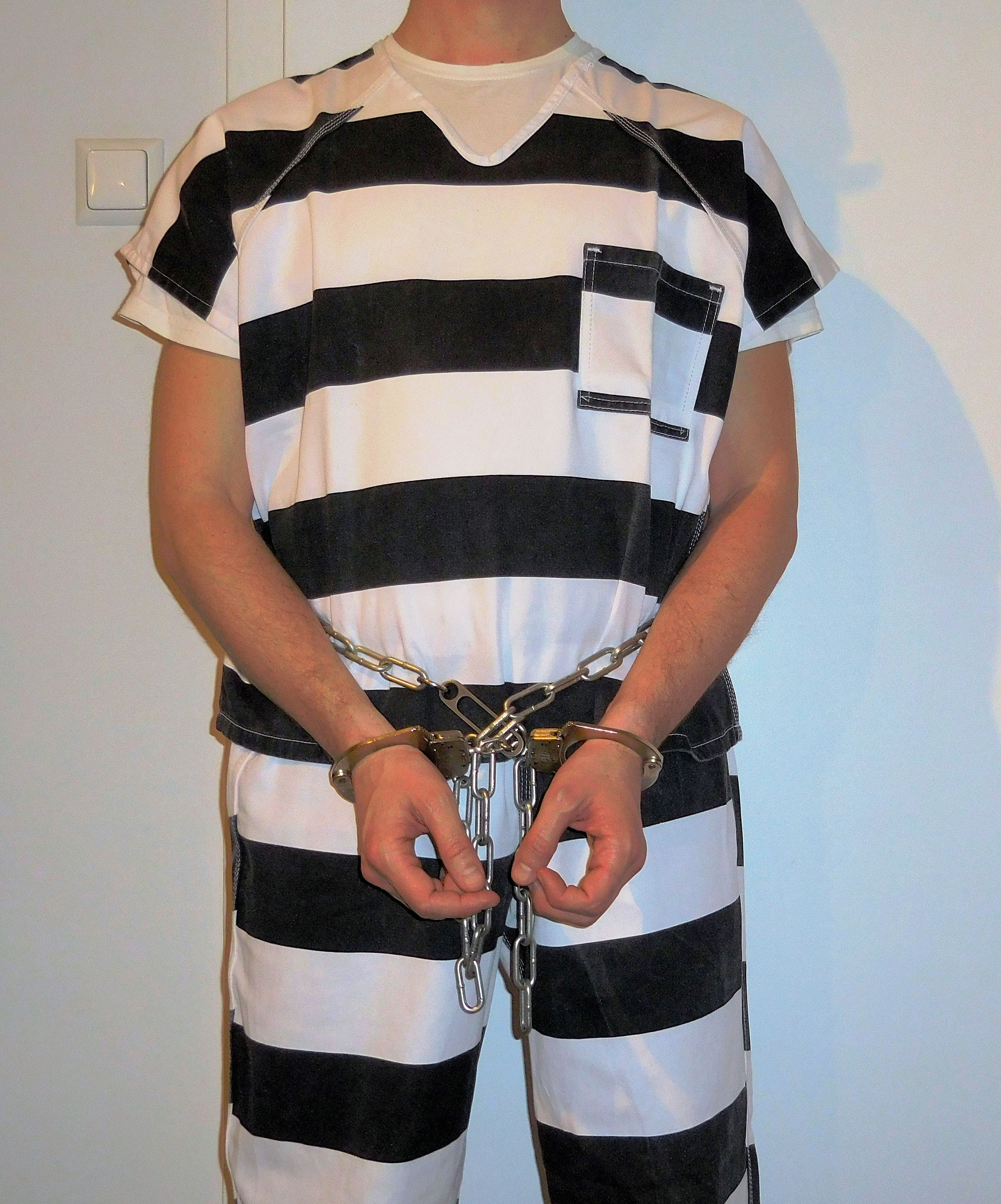
Inmate in Smith & Wesson m-1 "universal" handcuffs secured with a m-1840 belly chain

Smith & Wesson is also a manufacturer of restraints (handcuffs, leg irons, belly chains, prisoner transport chains). Smith & Wesson first manufactured handcuffs for the Peerless handcuff company which obtained the right to produce the first swinging-bow handcuffs patented by George A. Carney in 1912. Peerless did not have the facilities necessary for production so they contracted Smith & Wesson to manufacture the handcuffs for them. When Peerless set up its own production plant, Smith & Wesson continued to produce Peerless-type handcuffs under their own brand.

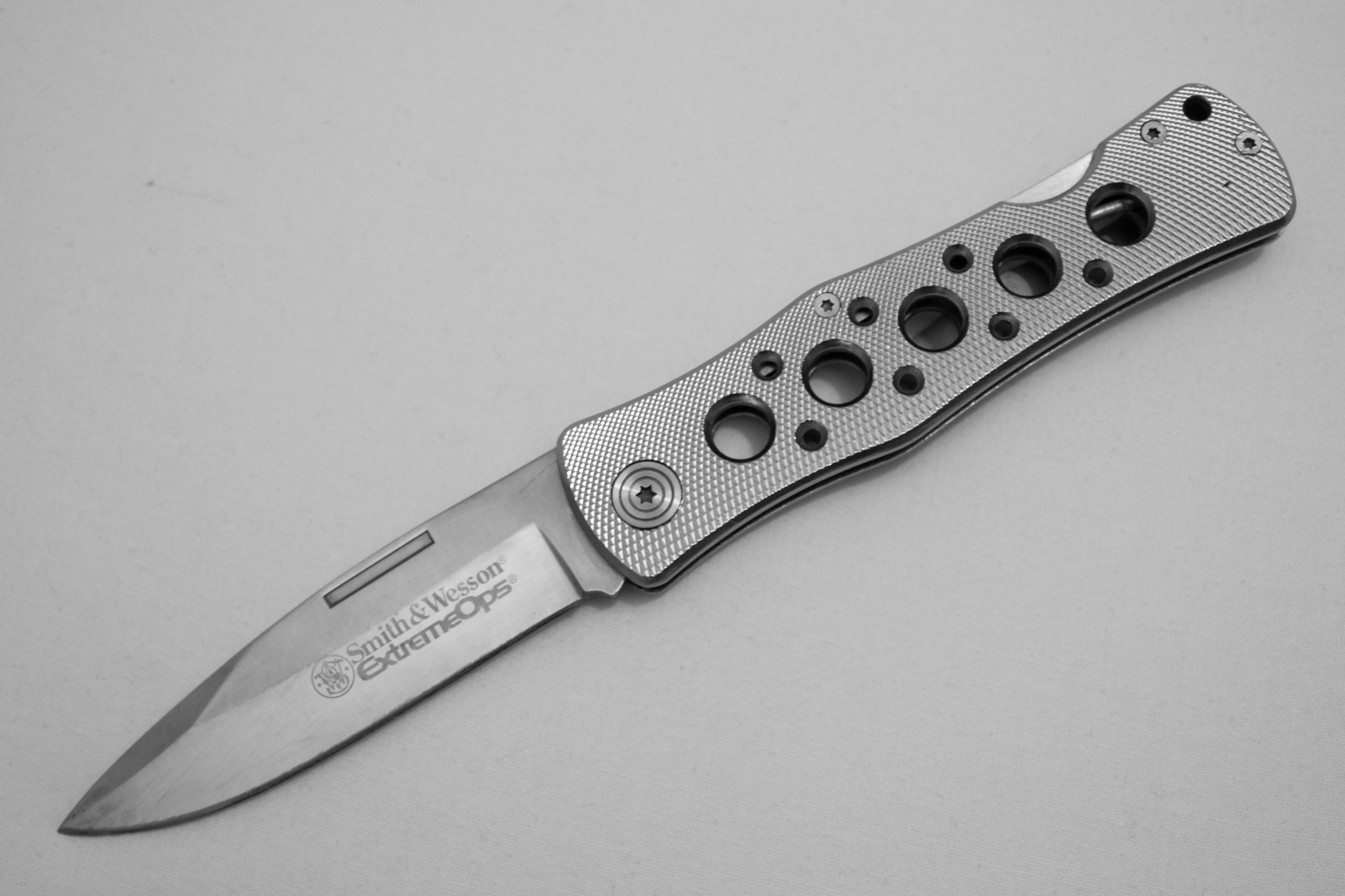
A Smith & Wesson "ExtremeOps" brand pocket knife

Smith & Wesson markets firearm accessories, safes, apparel, watches, collectables, knives, axes, tools, air guns, emergency light bars, and other products under its brand name.

John Wilson and Roy G. Jinks designed the Smith & Wesson model 6010 Bowie knife in 1971 and the 1973 Texas Ranger Bowie knife. Blackie Collins designed the subsequent model 6020 and 6060 Survival knife from 1974 to 1979. All of these limited-production and custom knives were made at the Springfield, Massachusetts, United States factory.

In October 2002, Smith & Wesson announced it had entered into a licensing agreement with Cycle Source Group to produce a line of bicycles designed by and for law enforcement. These bicycles had custom configurations and silent hubs.

Smith & Wesson flashlights are available to the general public. They are designed and produced by PowerTech, Inc, in Collierville, Tennessee.

Smith & Wesson has a line of wood pellet grills named after various pistol cartridges, such as .22 Magnum, .38 Special, .44 Magnum, .357 Magnum, and .500 Magnum.

Smith & Wesson has entered into a licensing agreement with North Carolina–based Wellco Enterprises to design and distribute a full line of tactical law enforcement footwear.

== See also ==
- Daniel Leavitt – American inventor and arms maker
- Bangor Punta – Defunct American conglomerate
