= Smith & Wesson Model 4006 =

Handgun

S&W Model 4006
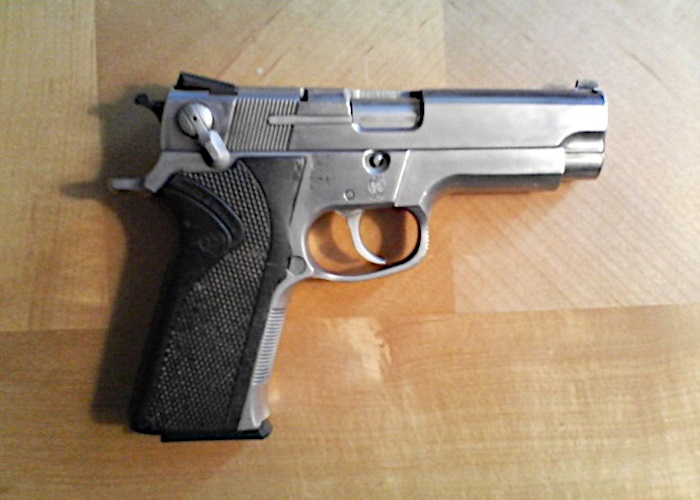
- Smith & Wesson 4006 Pistol
- Type: Semi-automatic pistol
- Place of origin: United States

Service history
- In service: 1990–present
- Used by: See § Users

Production history
- Produced: 1990–2011

Specifications
- Mass: 1058 g (37.3 oz)
- Length: 191 mm (7.5 in)
- Barrel length: 102 mm (4 in)
- Cartridge: .40 S&W
- Action: Double/single
- Feed system: 11-round magazine
- Sights: 3-dot adjustable or Novak LoMount combat

The S&W Model 4006 is a semi-automatic handgun introduced by Smith & Wesson on January 17, 1990 along with the new .40 S&W cartridge. It is a 3rd-generation S&W pistol.

== Design ==
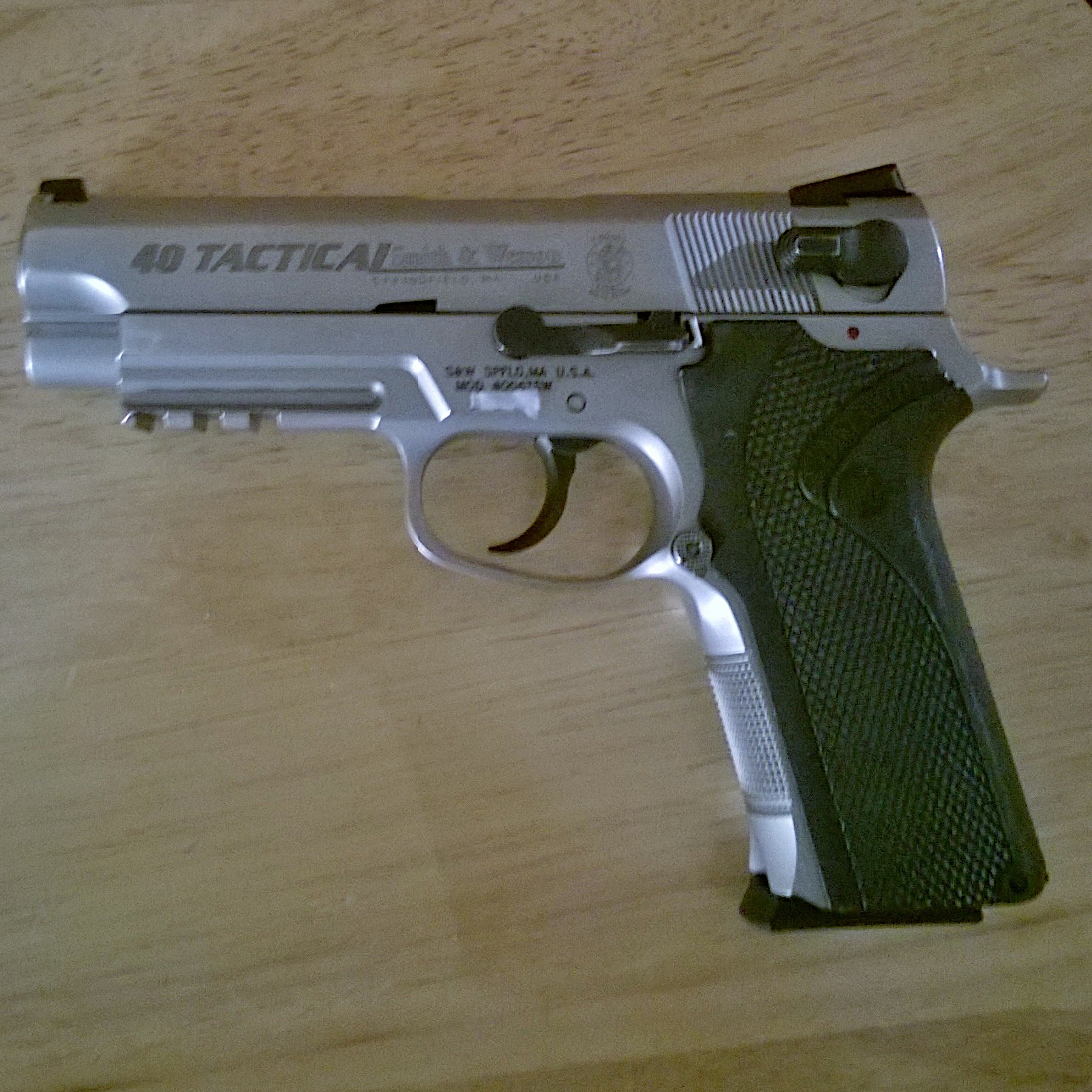
Here is an S&W 4006 with a picatinny rail and bobbed hammer. This model previously served with the California Highway Patrol.

The S&W 4006 features a stainless steel frame and slide, double action/single action handgun with 4-inch barrel, slide-mounted de-cock/safety and an 11-round staggered-column magazine. It was one of the new 3rd-generation S&W semi-autos, designed with input from famed gunsmith Wayne Novak of Parkersburg, WV. The 4006 introduced the new .40 S&W cartridge and featured a wraparound one-piece grip made of Xenoy versus the earlier standard 2-piece grip panels, as well as low-profile 3-dot Novak sights.

A lightweight aluminum alloy–framed S&W 4003/4043 was produced that weighed 800 grams (29 ounces) and was more comfortable to carry. The 4046 model was a DAO (double-action-only) pistol in all stainless steel. The first 2 digits in the model number indicate caliber. The last digit, either a 3 or 6, indicates aluminum or stainless steel frame, respectively. Various safety features include a safety lever (which blocks the firing pin from the hammer) as well as a magazine safety (which keeps the pistol from firing when no magazine is inserted). While a true double-action pistol, the firearm shares this magazine disconnect feature with Browning Hi-Power pistols: it cannot be fired without the magazine in place. This feature was developed to meet the needs of various law enforcement agencies interested in providing another level of safety for their officers.

== Users ==
- From possibly the mid-1990s until 2008, the Atlanta Police Department used the 4003 TSW until replacing it with the Smith & Wesson M&P.
- Colorado State Patrol - Used from 1998 until 2008, replaced with the Smith & Wesson M&P40
- California Highway Patrol until 2019, replaced with the Smith & Wesson M&P40
- Nevada Highway Patrol used the Smith & Wesson 4006 in from the mid 1990s until the mid 2000s when it moved to SIG Sauer.
- Brink's Armored Car used the double action-only 4046 variant as standard-issue to replace their .38 Special revolvers. They issued the 4046 until 2011, when they were replaced by Smith & Wesson M&P 40s, however some Brink's locations still use the 4046.
- California Department of Parks and Recreation
- Alaska State troopers
- Iowa State Patrol
