= Smith & Wesson Ladysmith =

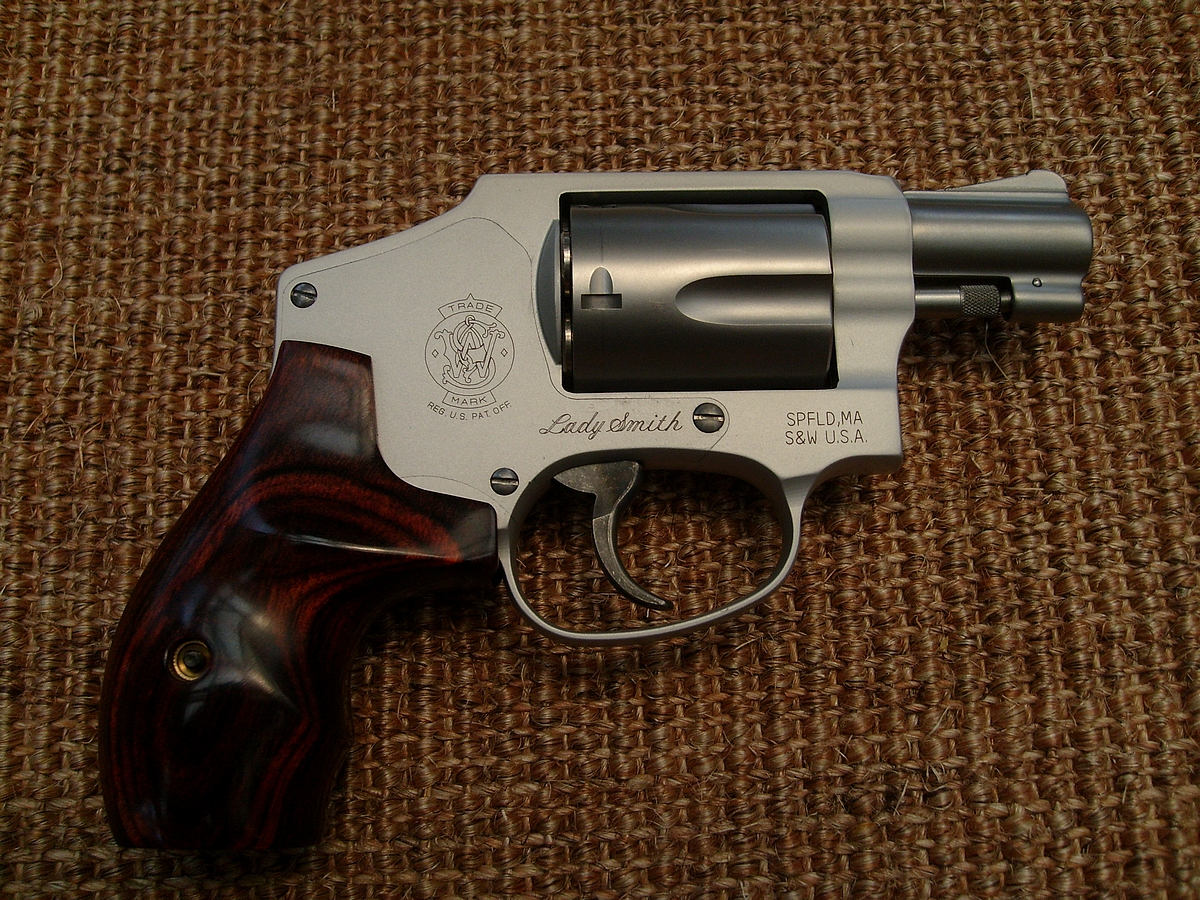
- A Smith & Wesson Model 642 LS Ladysmith
- Type: Revolver or pistol
- Place of origin: United States

Service history
- In service: 1902–1986

Production history
- Manufacturer: Smith & Wesson
- Variants: Model 631LS; Model 36LS; Model 60LS; Model 65LS; Model 642LS

Specifications
- Barrel length: 2 in (51 mm) to 3.5 in (89 mm)
- Cartridge: .22 Long.32 H&R Magnum.38 Special.357 Magnum; 9mm Parabellum
- Action: Double Action Revolver; Semi-auto Pistol
- Feed system: 5-round cylinder (.38 revolver); 6-round cylinder (.32 revolver); 8-round magazine (9mm revolver)

The S&W Ladysmith (later styled LadySmith) is a series of handguns manufactured by Smith & Wesson starting early in the first decade of the 20th century.

== History ==
Smith & Wesson has produced firearms over the years in several standard frame sizes. M-frame refers to the small early Ladysmith frame.

Later LadySmith small revolvers were made on the somewhat larger J-frame, the standard S&W small-frame revolver.

The tiny M-frame .22" hand-ejector Ladysmith revolver was produced from 1902 through 1921, and later diminutive revolvers were termed LadySmith, capitalizing the "S".

Early models, branded were chambered in .22 Long. Starting in the 1980s, under the slightly modified "LadySmith" moniker, S&W manufactured several short-barreled revolvers and semi-automatic pistols.

== Models ==
=== Smith & Wesson Model 36 LadySmith ===
Also known as the Chief's Special LadySmith. Blued steel, small frame, 5-shot, .38 Special revolver.

=== Smith & Wesson Model 60 LadySmith ===
Also known as the Chief's Special LadySmith. Stainless steel, small frame, 5-shot, .38 Special or .357 Magnum, revolver.

=== Smith & Wesson Model 65 LadySmith ===
Stainless steel, medium frame, 6-shot, .357 Magnum revolver.

=== Smith & Wesson Model 631 LadySmith ===
Stainless steel, small frame, 6-shot, .32 H&R Magnum revolver. (Note: The Model 631 with a total volume of 5457 units, was produced only in 1990 of which only 190 received the "LadySmith" moniker.)

=== Smith & Wesson Model 642 LadySmith ===
Small frame, 5-shot, .38 Special, hammerless revolver with an aluminum frame and stainless steel cylinder.

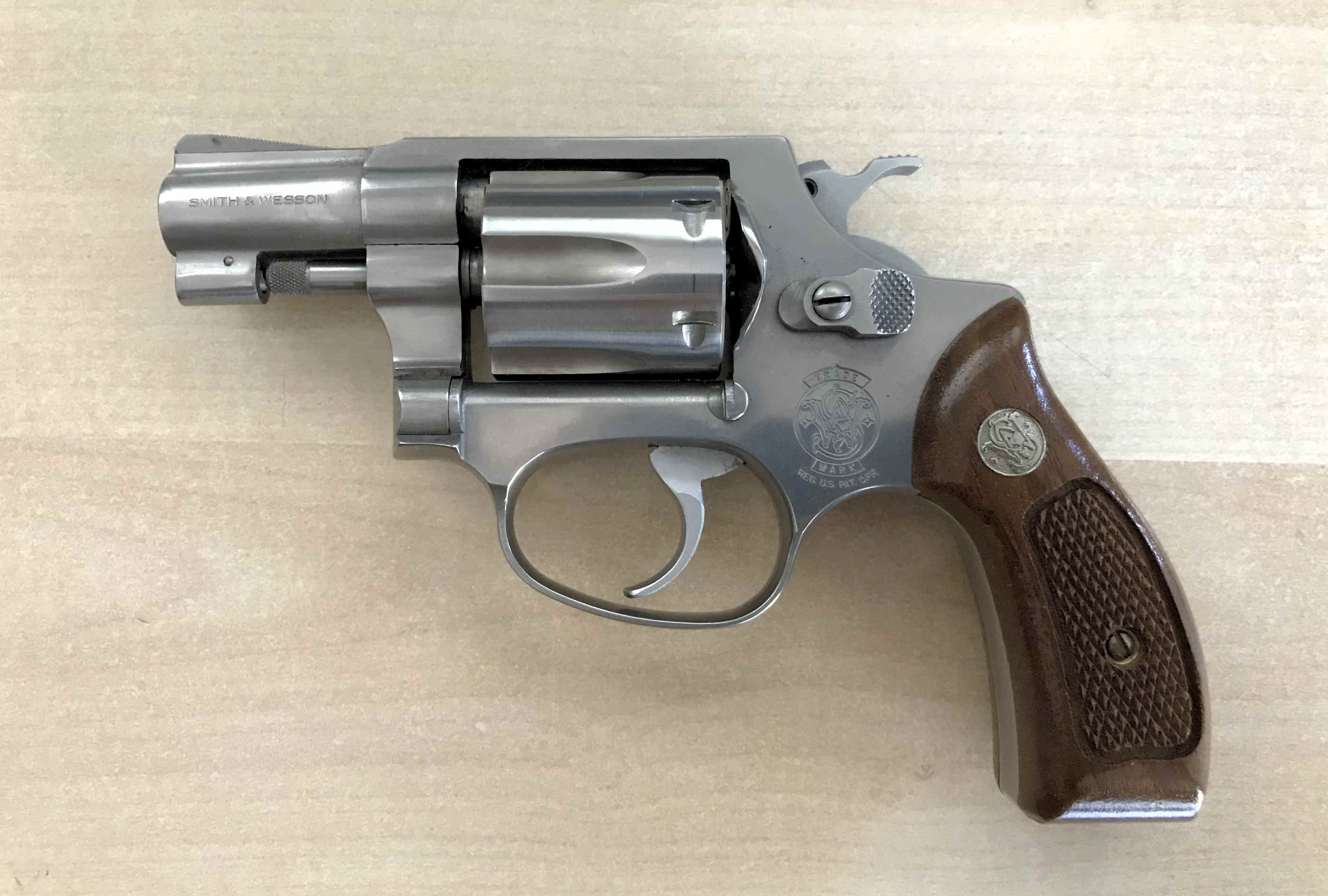
A Model 631 LadySmith 32 Mag stainless steel revolver
