= Smith & Wesson Model 78G =

Smith & Wesson models 78G and 79G are vintage models of air-powered pistols. Each model chambered either a .177 or .22 caliber pellet. The Smith & Wesson G-series pistols were designed with attention to accuracy and weight, making them ideal in developing short-range marksmanship skills while using a less-penetrating, air-driven pellet as the projectile. They were designed to imitate the Smith & Wesson Model 41 target pistol. Both models are equipped with target style adjustable sights.

These airguns were manufactured from 1970 to 1978. They are single shot pistols, requiring manual reloading after each shot. Velocity is adjustable and some early models allow for trigger travel adjustment. The value of these guns has held remarkably well, with pristine models (with original box, S&W pellets and S&W CO_{2} cartridges) selling for multiples of the original price. Seal kits are still widely available so they remain serviceable shooters even today.

While each model uses small pellets driven by CO_{2} cartridges, an airgun is still a potentially dangerous weapon requiring attention to all the basic safety premises followed when using regular combustion-driven firearms.
