= Smith & Wesson Model 13 =

US revolver

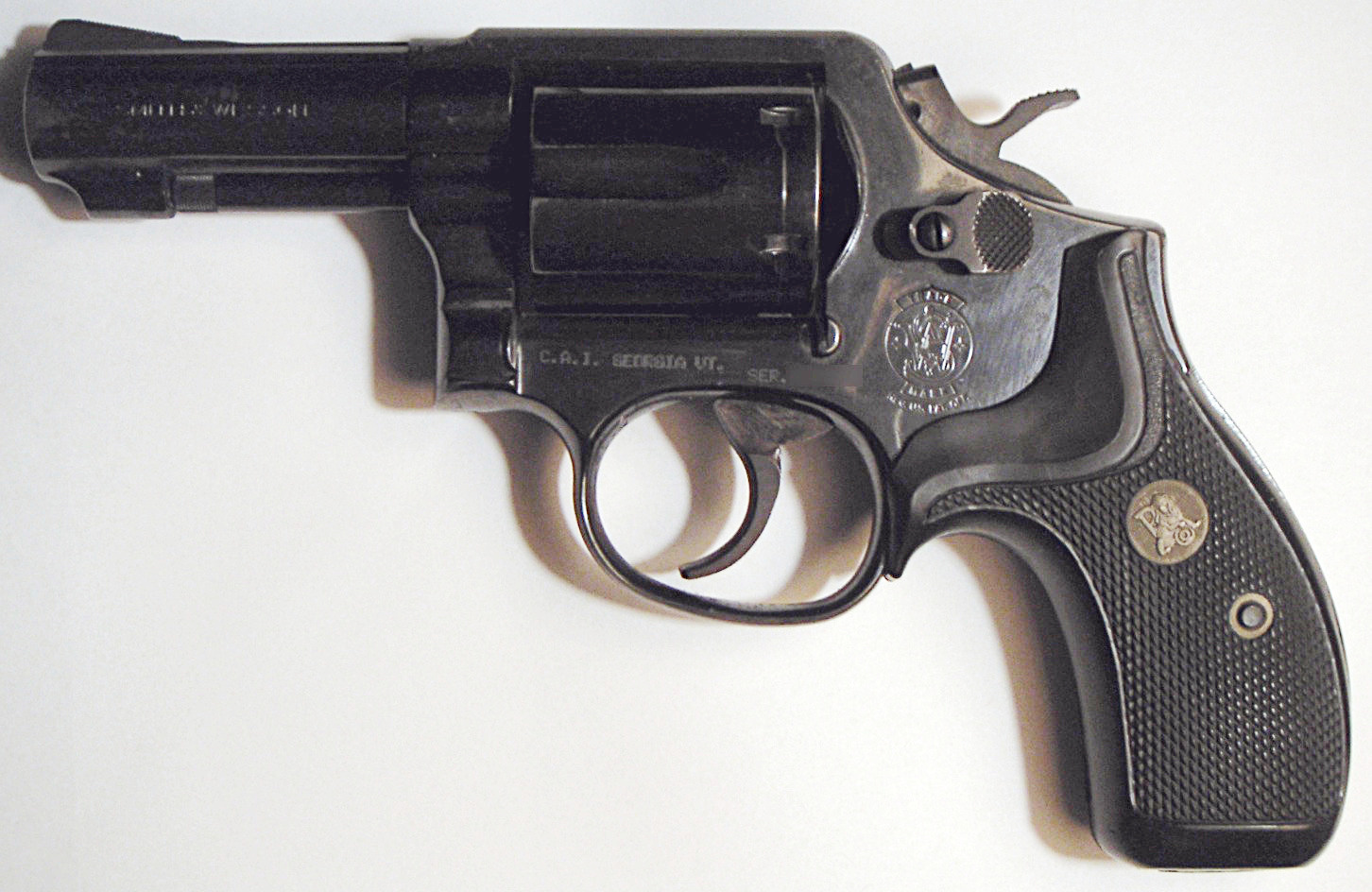
- S&W Model 13-4; blued steel, 3" barrel, round butt, aftermarket Pachmayr grips
- Type: Revolver
- Place of origin: United States

Service history
- Used by: United States, Hong Kong

Production history
- Manufacturer: Smith & Wesson
- Unit cost: $242 (1983) $547 (2004)
- Produced: 1972–2004
- Variants: Model 65 (stainless steel); Model 65LS (LadySmith)

Specifications
- Mass: 31 oz. (3" bbl)
- Length: 8" (with 3" barrel); 9" (with 4" barrel)
- Barrel length: 3" or 4"
- Cartridge: .357 Magnum, .38 Special
- Action: Double action
- Feed system: Six-round Revolving cylinder
- Sights: Fixed (rear notch; front ramp)

The Smith & Wesson Model 13 (Military & Police Magnum) is a .357 Magnum revolver designed for military and police use. It is based on Smith & Wesson's K-frame—specifically, it is a .357 Magnum version of the heavy-barrel variant of the .38 Special Model 10 (originally called the Military & Police).

== Design ==
The Model 13 is a double-action revolver with a capacity of six rounds. Barrel lengths are 3-inch and 4-inch with fixed sights. Both round-butt and square-butt versions were produced. The Model 19 is essentially the same gun with adjustable sights and a partial underlug. The Model 13 has a blued finish; the Model 65 is a variant in matte finish stainless steel.

The Model 13 was manufactured from 1974 to 1999. The Model 65 was manufactured from 1972 to 2004. The Model 13 should not be confused with the M13, which was a lightweight alloy revolver produced from 1954 to 1956 for the U.S. Air Force, known as the Colt Aircrewman.

== Model variations ==
Engineering and production changes of the Model 13, indicated as a dash after the model number stamped on the frame:

Model	Year	Modifications
13-1	1974	Introduced for the NYSP with model # stamping
13-2	1977	Changed from gas ring on yoke to cylinder
13-3	1982	Eliminated cylinder counterbore and pinned barrel/small change in cylinder length to 1.62"
13-4	1988	New yoke retention system/radius stud package/floating hand/hammer nose busing
13-4	1994	Synthetic grips, change extractor
13-4	1995–1996	Delete square butt features
13-4	1996	Begin shipment in foam lined blue plastic case, Begin serrated backstrap and fore strap on a round butt frame for 18 months, then discontinued
13-4	1997	Discontinued 3" barrel / change to MIM thumb piece and trigger, ship with Master trigger lock
13-5	1997	Changes to frame design, cylinder stop stud eliminated, changed to MIM hammer with floating firing pin, changes to internal lock works
13-5	1997	Discontinued Model 13 with few produced

== Service ==
Both models were issued by police agencies and federal law enforcement agencies in the United States.

The Model 13 was requested by the New York State Police in order to have a .357 Magnum revolver to replace their Model 10 .38 Special. The Model 65 in stainless steel came about at the request of the Oklahoma Highway Patrol.

The FBI issued the Model 13 with round butt and 3" heavy barrel shortly before switching to semi-automatic pistols.

The Model 13 was the last revolver issued by the FBI. It was an unqualified success with Special Agents. The round-butt K-frame with 3" barrel in .357 Magnum proved to be an ideal sidearm for an investigative agency.

The Model 65 is used by the Texas Department of Criminal Justice.

== Users ==
- Canada
  - Royal Canadian Mounted Police
- Hong Kong
  - Independent Commission Against Corruption
- United States
  - Anne Arundel County Police Department
  - DuPage County Sheriff's Department
  - Federal Bureau of Investigation
  - Fort Worth Police Department
  - Georgia Board of Pardons and Parole
  - Iowa State Police
  - Maine State Police
  - Maryland State Police
  - Massachusetts State Police
  - New York State Police
  - North Carolina Department of Corrections
  - Oklahoma Highway Patrol
  - Sacramento County Sheriff's Department
  - San Antonio Police Department
  - Shelby County Sheriff's Department (Tennessee)
  - Tampa Police Department
  - Texas Department of Criminal Justice
  - Wayne County Sheriff's Office (Michigan)
