= Smith & Wesson 1000 Series =

- Type: Semi-automatic shotgun
- Place of origin: Turkey

Production history
- Manufacturer: Smith & Wesson
- Unit cost: $650 to $925 (MSRP)
- Produced: c. 2007–2010
- Variants: 1012 & 1012 Super (12 ga.); 1020 & 1020SS (20 ga.)

Specifications
- Mass: 6.3 to 6.8 lb (2.9 to 3.1 kg) (1012); 7.1 to 7.5 lb (3.2 to 3.4 kg) (1012 Super); 5.9 to 6.2 lb (2.7 to 2.8 kg) (1020); 5.5 lb (2.5 kg) (1020SS)
- Length: 45 to 51 in (110 to 130 cm) (1012 or 1012 Super); 44.5 to 50.5 in (113 to 128 cm) (1020); 43 in (110 cm) (1020SS)
- Barrel length: 24, 26, 28, 30 in (61, 66, 71, 76 cm)
- Cartridge: 12 and 20 gauge
- Action: Semi-automatic
- Feed system: Tube magazine (capacity: 4 standard, 3 magnum)
- Sights: Front- and mid-beads

The Smith & Wesson 1000 Series are semi-automatic shotguns offered by Smith & Wesson circa 2007 to 2010. The shotguns were manufactured at a Smith & Wesson facility in Turkey.

== History ==
In November 2006, Smith & Wesson announced that it would re-enter the shotgun market with two new lines of shotguns, the 1000 Series and the break-open Elite Series, unveiled at the 2007 SHOT Show. Both series were manufactured in Turkey.

The 1000 Series was offered in four models:

- 1012 – 12-gauge chambered for 2 3/4 and 3 in (7.0 and 7.6 cm) shotshells; barrel lengths 24 to 30 in (61 to 76 cm) in 2-inch increments
- 1012 Super – same as 1012, except chambered for 3 1/2 in (8.9 cm) magnum shotshells
- 1020 – 20-gauge with same chambering and barrel lengths as the 1012
- 1020SS – "short stock" 1020; 24 in (61 cm) barrel and 43 in (110 cm) overall length

The 1000 Series was discontinued by September 2010.
