= Smith & Wesson Model 1854 =

- Type: Lever-action centerfire rifle
- Place of origin: United States

Production history
- Manufacturer: Smith & Wesson
- Produced: 2024–present

Specifications
- Mass: 6.8 lb (3.1 kg)
- Length: 36 in (91 cm)
- Barrel length: 19.25 in (48.9 cm)
- Width: 1.6 in (4.1 cm)
- Caliber: .357 Magnum; .44 Magnum; .45 Colt; .30-30 Winchester; .360 Buckhammer; .45-70 Government
- Action: Lever action
- Feed system: 8+1 rounds (.357 Magnum, .44 Magnum, and .45 Colt) or 6+1 rounds (.30-30 Winchester, .360 Buckhammer and .45-70 Government)
- Sights: Gold bead

The Smith & Wesson Model 1854 is a lever-action repeating rifle designed by Smith & Wesson. It is chambered in .357 Magnum, .44 Magnum, .45 Colt, .30-30 Winchester, .360 Buckhammer and .45-70 Government.

Introduced in January 2024, it was the first lever-action firearm introduced by Smith & Wesson in 170 years (since the Volcanic Rifle & Volcanic Pistol was patented in 1854).
