= Smith & Wesson Elite Series =

- Type: Break-open shotgun
- Place of origin: Turkey

Production history
- Manufacturer: Smith & Wesson
- Unit cost: $2,350 (MSRP)
- Produced: c. 2007–2010
- No. built: ~3,000 (Gold)
- Variants: Elite Gold (20 ga. side-by-side); Elite Silver (12 ga. over-and-under)

Specifications
- Mass: 6.5 or 6.7 lb (2.9 or 3.0 kg) (Gold); 7.6 to 7.8 lb (3.4 to 3.5 kg) (Silver)
- Length: 43.5 or 45.5 in (110 or 116 cm) (Gold); 44 to 48 in (110 to 120 cm) (Silver)
- Barrel length: 26 or 28 in (66 or 71 cm) (Gold); 26 to 30 in (66 to 76 cm) (Silver)
- Cartridge: 12 and 20 gauge
- Action: Break action
- Sights: Front- and mid-beads

The Smith & Wesson Elite Series are break-open shotguns offered by Smith & Wesson circa 2007 to 2010. The shotguns were manufactured at a Smith & Wesson facility in Turkey.

== History ==
In November 2006, Smith & Wesson announced that it would re-enter the shotgun market with two new lines of shotguns, the Elite Series and the semi-automatic 1000 Series, unveiled at the 2007 SHOT Show. Both series were manufactured in Turkey.

The Elite Series was offered in two variants:

- Elite Gold – 20-gauge, side-by-side, barrel lengths 26 or 28 in (66 or 71 cm)
- Elite Silver – 12-gauge, over-and-under, barrel lengths 26, 28, or 30 in (66, 71, or 76 cm)

Smith & Wesson offered the Elite Series with an "Heirloom Warranty" program, a first of its kind in the firearms industry. The warranty provides both the original buyer and the buyer's chosen heir with a lifetime warranty on all Elite Series shotguns.

The 26-inch Silver offering was discontinued in 2008. The entire Elite Series was discontinued by mid-2010.
