= Smith & Wesson Model 4506 =

S&W Model 4506
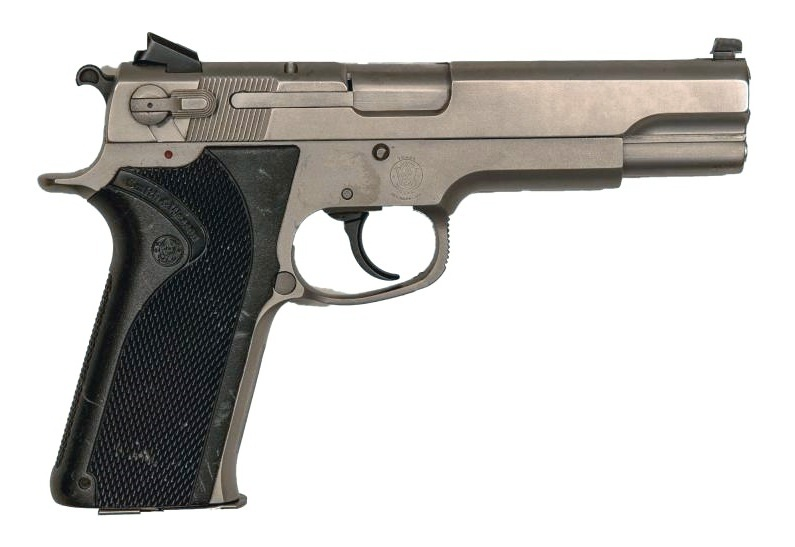
- Right-side view of a Model 4506-1
- Type: Semi-Automatic Pistol
- Place of origin: United States

Production history
- Manufacturer: Smith & Wesson
- Produced: 1988–1999
- Variants: Model 4506-1

Specifications
- Mass: 2.6 lbs (1.16 kg)
- Barrel length: 5" (12.7 cm), one documented special order gun left the factory with a 4.25" barrel (10.795 CM)
- Cartridge: .45 ACP
- Caliber: .451 in (11.45 mm)
- Action: Double Action/Single Action
- Effective firing range: 165 ft (50 m)
- Feed system: 8-Round Box Magazine (+1 in chamber)
- Sights: Fixed Iron Three-Dot, Adjustable available

The Smith & Wesson Model 4506 is a third-generation semi-automatic pistol from Smith & Wesson's 4500 series of handguns. The 4506 is chambered for the .45 ACP cartridge and, with the purchase of special springs, the stronger .45 Super. It is constructed almost entirely from stainless steel and is thus extremely resistant to harsh weather conditions.

== Design ==
The 4506 is a traditional double-action/single-action pistol. The first shot may be fired either in double-action mode, if the hammer is not cocked because the safety had been engaged or otherwise, or in single-action mode. Each subsequent shot is fired in single-action mode. It features one-piece Xenoy wrap-around grips with either a curved or straight back strap. The 4506 was produced from 1988 to 1999.

Like most 3rd generation Smith & Wesson semi automatic pistols, the 4506 features a combination safety lever and decocker mounted on the slide, a plunger type firing pin safety, a magazine disconnect and a pin mounted, pivoting spring actuated external extractor.

== Variants ==
Smith & Wesson Model 4506-1: Later, modified version of the 4506, incorporating changes made to strengthen the basic design for the 10mm Auto cartridge version, the Model 1006. Change to the slide manufacturing process. Trigger guard changed from square to round. Much later, the hammer and trigger were changed to being blued instead of receiving a flash chrome finish, and the S&W roll marks were dropped in favor of laser etching.

Smith & Wesson Model 4516: Compact version with a 3 3/4" barrel on a smaller frame accepting 7 round single column magazines.

Smith & Wesson Model 4546: Double-action-only version of the 4506 with a rounded, stubby hammer. Only produced in 1992.

Smith & Wesson Model 4563: Midsize version with a 4 1/4" barrel on a full-size alloy frame.

Smith & Wesson Model 4566: Midsize version with a 4 1/4" barrel on a full-size steel frame, the 4566 was formerly the issued sidearm of the New Hampshire State Police. Current issue (June 2015) with West Virginia State Police, in DAO (Double-Action-Only; TSW version), with bobbed hammer. Two versions in use: Natural stainless and blackened Melonite. Both have the S&W emblem and "West Virginia State Police" followed by WVSP shoulder patch laser etched left side of slide. "West Virginia State Police" laser etched right side of slide. Picatinny rail in front of trigger guard. WVSP carry two vertical back-up mags left of dutybelt buckle for a total of 24 rounds on patrol.

Smith & Wesson Model 4567: Midsize version with a 4 1/4" barrel on a full-size stainless steel frame with a blue carbon steel slide and tritium night sights. Also known as the Model 4567-NS. Only 1236 were produced in the 1992 single year production.

Smith & Wesson Model 4505: Rare blued carbon steel version of the 4506, only about 1,200 manufactured in 1992

Smith & Wesson Model 4586: A double-action-only version of the 4566, with a partially preset hammer and no external safety/decocker. The issued sidearm of the Idaho State Police from 1992 to 2002.
