= Smith & Wesson Model 36 =

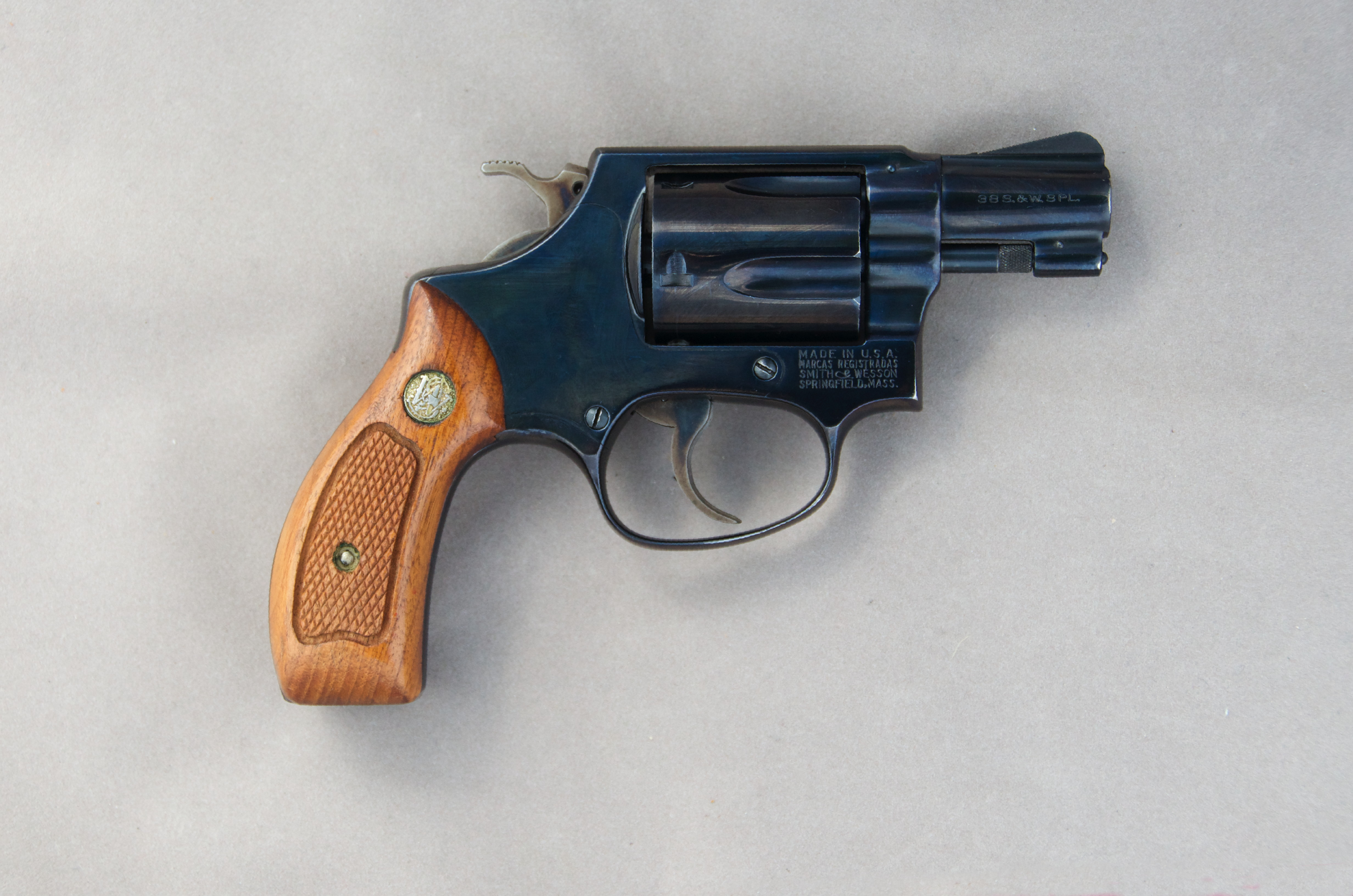
- Smith & Wesson Model 36 revolver
- Type: Revolver
- Place of origin: United States

Service history
- In service: 1950–present
- Used by: See Users

Production history
- Manufacturer: Smith & Wesson
- Unit cost: $110.00 (blued) (1976) $121.00 (nickel) (1976)

Specifications
- Mass: 19.5 oz (550 g)
- Length: 6.22 in (15.8 cm)
- Barrel length: 2 in (5.1 cm) or 3 in (7.6 cm)
- Caliber: .38 Special
- Action: Double Action/Single Action
- Feed system: 5-round cylinder
- Sights: Fixed rear, front blade (Model 36); adjustable rear, fixed front (Model 50)

The Smith & Wesson Model 36 (also known as the Chiefs Special) is a revolver chambered for .38 Special. It is one of several models of J-frame revolvers. It was introduced in 1950, and is still in production in the classic blued Model 36 and the stainless steel Model 60.

== History ==
The Model 36 was designed in the era just after World War II, when Smith & Wesson stopped producing war materials and resumed normal production.

For the Model 36, they sought to design a revolver that could fire the more powerful (compared to the .38 Long Colt or the .38 S&W) .38 Special round in a small, concealable package.

Since the older I-frame was not able to handle this load, a new frame was designed, which became the J-frame.

The new design was introduced at the International Association of Chiefs of Police (IACP) convention in 1950, and was favorably received. A vote was held to name the new revolver, and the name "Chiefs Special" won.

A 3-inch (76 mm) barreled version design went into production immediately, due to high demand. It was available in either a blued or nickel-plated finish.

It was produced as the "Chiefs Special" until 1957, when it then became the Model 36. The "Chiefs Special" continued to be manufactured as a separate variant.

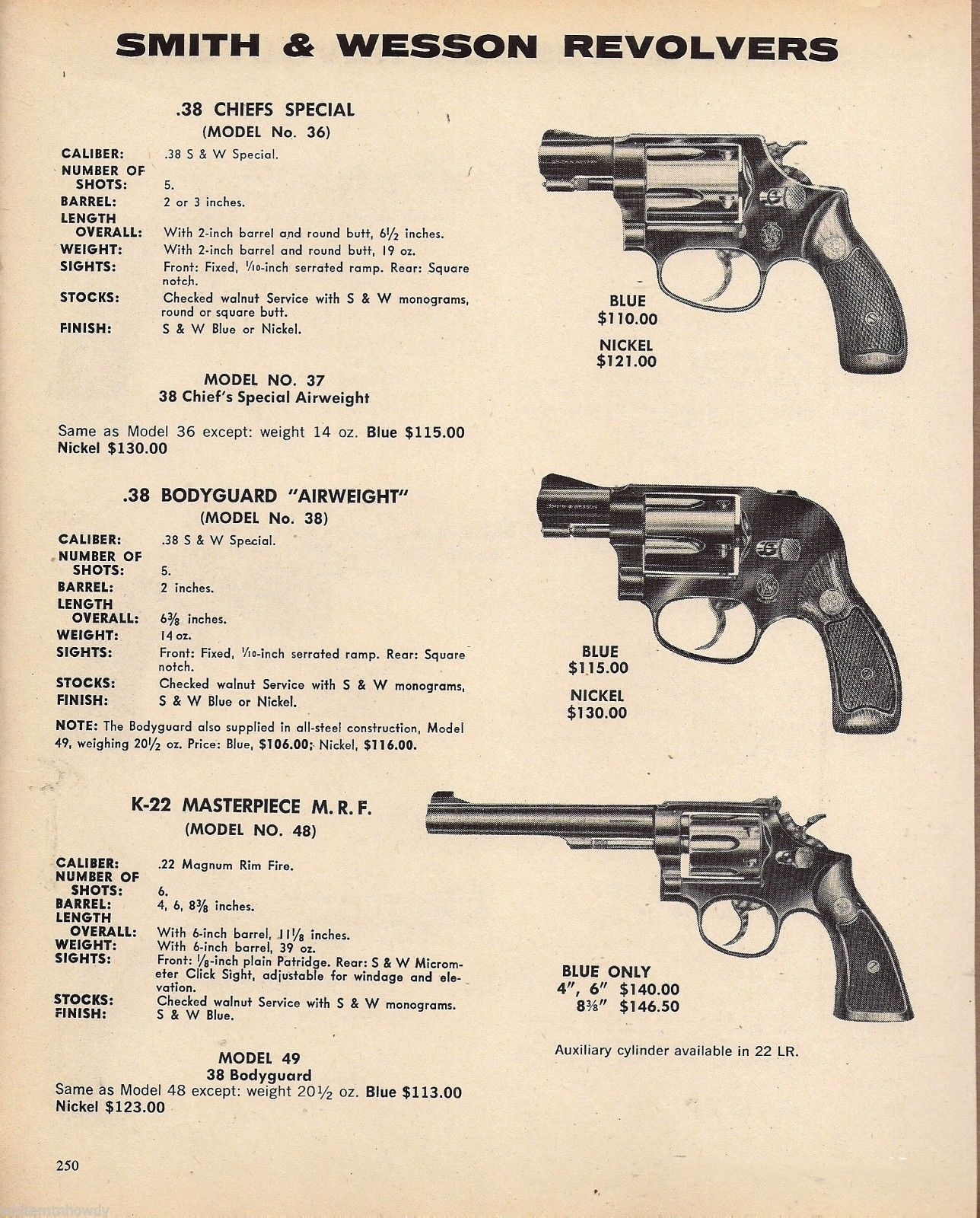
A page of the 1976 S&W catalog, detailing the Models 36, 37, 38, 48 and 49.

Serial number 337 was shipped to J. Edgar Hoover and is engraved with his name.

== Design ==
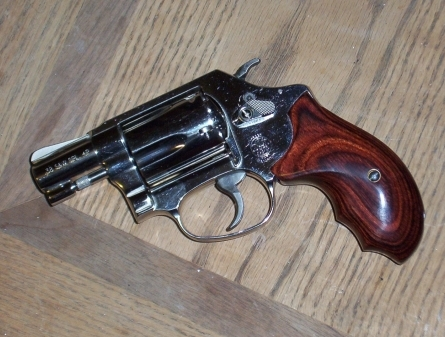
Model 36-10 with nickel finish and Smith & Wesson ergonomic rosewood grips

Designed to be small and compact, the Model 36 has been produced with 2-inch (1.875 inch actual length) or 3-inch barrels with fixed sights.

A version with an adjustable rear sight, the Model 50 Chief's Special Target, was also produced in limited numbers with both 2-inch and 3-inch barrels.

Like nearly all other "J-frame" Smith & Wesson revolvers, it has a 5-round capacity in a swing-out cylinder, and features an exposed hammer. It features a nickel-plated or blued finish and either wood or rubber grips.

== Variants ==
=== Airweight Model 37 ===
In 1951, Smith & Wesson introduced the Model 37, which was basically the Model 36 design with an aluminum frame and cylinder.

The aluminum cylinders proved to be problematic and were abandoned in favor of a steel cylinder.

Many Model 37 variants with a lanyard ring attached were made for Japan. Part of this contract was cancelled, resulting in many of these being sold to a wholesaler, who then re-sold them for civilian use in 2001.

In 2006, the Model 37 was dropped from Smith & Wesson's catalog.

=== LadySmith ===
In 1989, Smith & Wesson introduced the LadySmith variant of the Model 36.

This was available with 2 in (51 mm) or 3 in (76 mm) barrel and blued finish.

This model also featured special grips designed specifically for women, and had "LADYSMITH" engraved on the frame.

=== Model 36-6 Target ===
This variant had a 3-inch full lug barrel with adjustable sights and a blued glass finish. Approximately 615 Model 36-6 Target variations were produced.

=== Model 36 Gold ===
In 2002, Smith & Wesson reintroduced the Model 36 with gold features (hammer, thumbpiece, extractor, and trigger). The gold color was actually titanium nitride.

=== Texas Hold 'Em ===
Introduced in 2005, it was produced with a blued finish, imitation ivory grips, and 24k gold plate engraving.

=== Spanish Astra copies ===
In 1958, Spanish manufacturer Astra developed a high quality revolver line based on this weapon, under the name of Astra Cadix, Astra 250 and Astra NC6.

== Engineering and production changes ==
Model	Year	Modifications
	1957	Before 1957 produced as the Chief Special
36	1957	Stamping of model serial number at 125000
36	1962	Internal hammer alteration at serial 295000 to mainspring rod junction changed from ball and socket to fork and pin
36	1966	Thumb piece changed from 3rd style to flat latch for standard latch
36-1	1967	3” heavy barrel, changed to forked mainspring strut
36-1	1968	Delete diamond grip
36-1	1969	Begin J serial number prefix at J1
36-1	1975	Heavy barrel standard
36-1	1982	Eliminate pinned barrel
36-2	1988	New yoke retention system tapered barrel
36-3	1988	New yoke retention system heavy barrel
36-4	1989	Lady Smith Version 2” barrel standard
36-5	1989	Lady Smith Version 3” heavy barrel
36-5	1992	Lady Smith discontinued 3” barrel on LS; Ship w/LS soft case
36-5	1994	Laminate rosewood grips, change extractor
36-6	1989	Special production target version, 3” full lug with ribbed barrel, ramp on ramp base, wide smooth trigger
36-7	1990	New sight width on standard frame and barrel from 1/10” to 1/8”
36-8	1990	New sight width for heavy barrel frame to 1/8”
36-8	1991	Limited edition with full lug and target sights
36-8	1992	2” and 3” HB round butt only
36-8	1994	Uncle Mike’s grips, change extractor
36-8	1995-96	Delete square butt features, 2” barrel only in production, begin shipments in foam filled blue plastic case
36-9	1996	J magnum frame introduced rated for .38+P with 1.6” cylinder, change to MIM hammer and trigger, change to internal lock, ship with Master trigger lock
36-9	1997	Change to MIM thumbpiece
36-9	1999	Model 36 discontinued
36-10	2007	Model 36 Classic Series begins with blue, nickel and case color in 2” or 3” barrel
36-11	2025	Removed internal lock

== Users ==
- Japan: National Police Agency
- United States: Law enforcement in the United States

== Incidents ==
Shooter Dan White used a Model 36 Chief Special to assassinate George Moscone, the 37th Mayor of San Francisco and Harvey Milk, a member of The San Francisco Board of Supervisors and the first openly gay man to be elected to public office in California.

On July 15, 1974, Christine Chubbuck, a reporter for WXLT-TV, used the Smith & Wesson Model 36 to commit suicide live on air, a first in TV history.

On October 26, 1979, a Model 36 was used in the assassination of South Korean leader Park Chung Hee. A Walther PPK was also used.

On September 10, 2025, a mass shooting occurred at Evergreen High School in Evergreen, Colorado. The perpetrator, Desmond Holly, used a Model 36 in the shooting.
