= Colt New Police Revolver =

Colt New Police
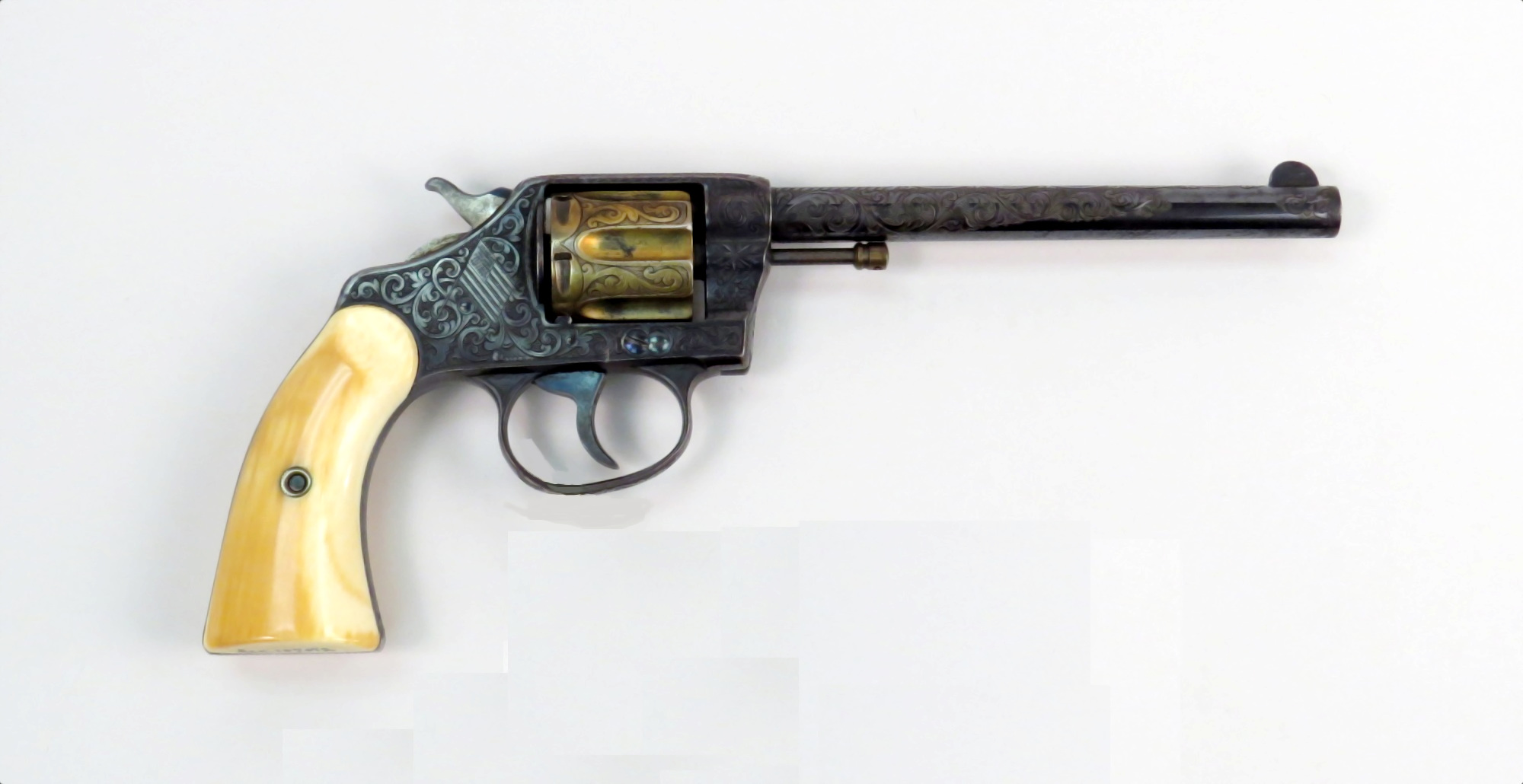
- Type: Revolver
- Place of origin: United States

Production history
- Manufacturer: Colt's Manufacturing Company
- Produced: 1896 to 1907

Specifications
- Cartridge: Colt .32 New Police
- Action: Double-action revolver
- Feed system: Cylinder

The Colt New Police was a double-action, six-shot revolver (which can also be fired single action). This gun was chambered in the .32 New Police, which is very similar to the .32 S&W Long. In addition to the .32 New Police cartridge, the revolver was available in 32 Colt.

The Colt New Police was manufactured from 1896 to 1907 by Colt's Manufacturing Company of Hartford, Connecticut. The sights on the revolver were fixed with a round blade in front and a grooved rear sight. The revolver was available with a 2 1/2-inch, four-inch, or six-inch barrel in a blued or nickel finish and hard rubber grips. The Colt New Police was selected by New York City (NYPD) Police Commissioner Theodore Roosevelt in 1896 to be the first standard-issue revolver for NYPD officers.

A target version was made until 1905 with a 6-inch barrel and adjustable sights.

The New Police Revolver was replaced in the Colt catalog in 1907 by the improved Colt Police Positive, which featured an internal hammer block safety and better lock work.
