= Smith & Wesson Model 60 =

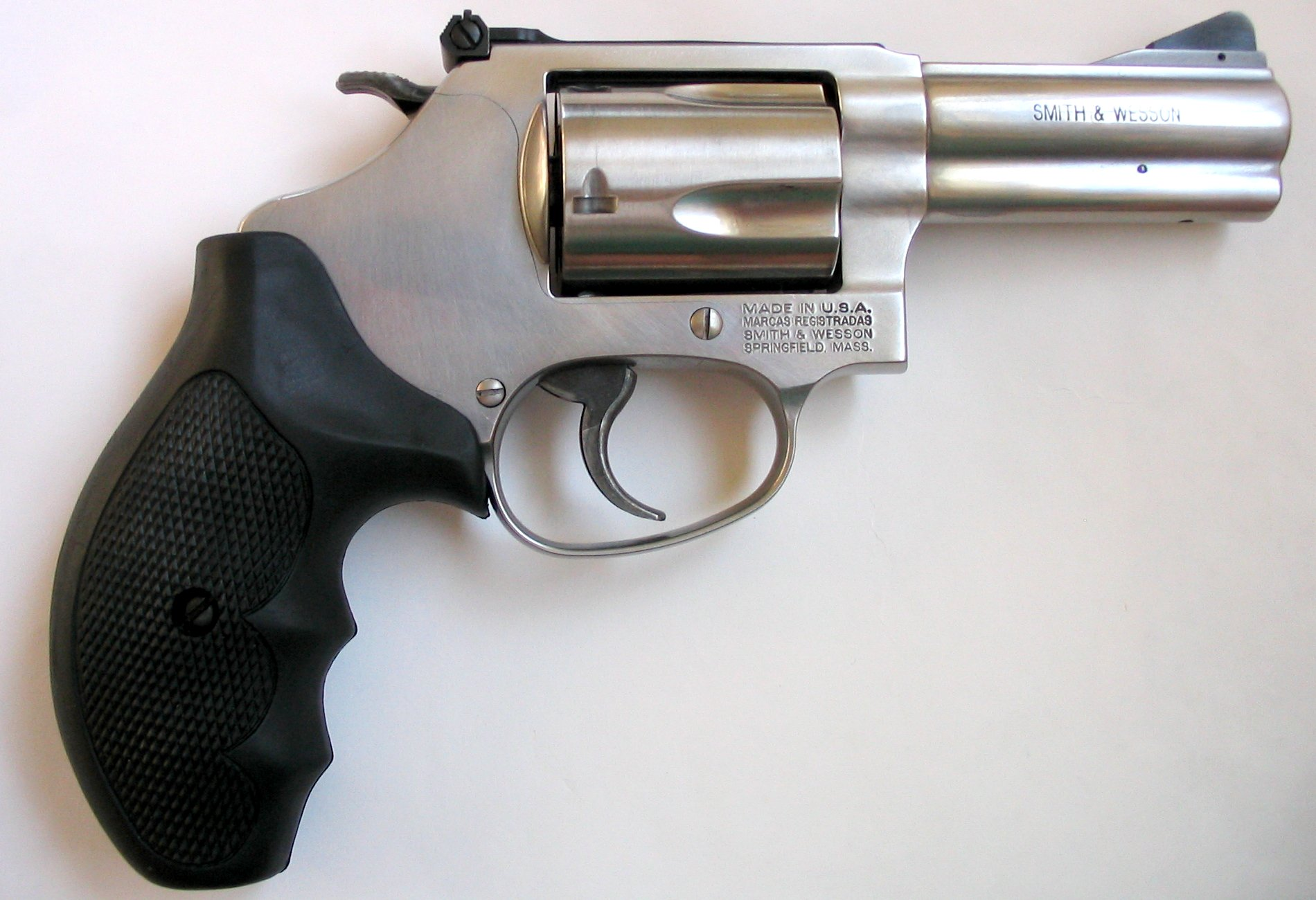
- Smith & Wesson Model 60-10 with 3" barrel
- Type: Service revolver
- Place of origin: United States

Service history
- In service: 1965–present

Production history
- Manufacturer: Smith & Wesson
- Unit cost: $727.00

Specifications
- Mass: ~19 oz (1.875 in), 22.58 oz. with 2.125" barrel, 23.99 oz. with 3" barrel, 30.50 oz. with 5" barrel (unloaded)
- Length: 6.625" with 2.125 barrel, 7.5" with 3" barrel, 9.0375 with 5" barrel
- Barrel length: 1.875" (original), 2.125", 3", 5"
- Caliber: .38 Special.38 Special +P.357 Magnum
- Action: Double Action
- Feed system: 5-round cylinder
- Sights: Fixed (1.875in or 2.125in barrel), Adjustable (1.875in (60-1), 3in & 5in bbl)

The Smith & Wesson Model 60 is a 5-shot service revolver introduced in 1965 chambered in .38 Special or .357 Magnum calibers.

== Design ==
A stainless steel development of the Smith & Wesson Model 36 Chief's Special revolver, the Model 60 has a swing-out cylinder, and features an exposed hammer.

=== Sights ===
With the exception of the Model 60-1, the vast majority of first-generation Model 60 revolvers were produced with fixed sights; modern production revolvers are typically offered with either a fixed or adjustable rear sight and a fixed sight in front.

=== Construction ===
It has been in production since 1965, and was the first regular production all stainless steel firearm made.

At that time the Model 60 featured a 1.875" barrel and was chambered solely for the .38 Special.

In 1996, the stronger J-Magnum frame was introduced and the cylinder was lengthened to support the .357 Magnum round(as well as the .38 Special).

The new model replaced the .38 Special-only version and is available in either a 2.125" or a 3" barrel, with a 5" barrel introduced in 2005.

== Popularity ==
The 1965 model's stainless steel production proved so popular that there was a waiting list at gunshops for up to six months to purchase one.

Despite the reduction in effective range due to the short barrel and its reduced sighting accuracy, the 2" barrel version is one of the preferred backup and concealed carry weapons for law enforcement officers and civilians alike to this day.

== Variants ==
=== Model 60 Chief's Special ===
Source:

=== Model 60-1 Chief's Special Target ===
- Limited production
- With adjustable sights

=== Smith & Wesson Ladysmith ===
- .38 Special, 357 Magnum (60-14)
- J-frame, 5-shot revolver; known as Chief's Special LadySmith

=== "NY-1" ===
- Non-catalogued factory variation (bobbed hammer, double action only)
- Made at the request of the NYPD starting in 1987 (S&W identification number: 102308)

== Users ==
- South Korea
  - National Police Agency (South Korea)
- United States
  - New York City Police Department
