= Xenoy =

Blend of plastics

Xenoy is a blend of plastics with many industrially-useful properties. It is typically polyester (polybutylene terephthalate, PBT, or polyethylene terephthalate, PET) and polycarbonate (PC): it is often labeled PBT+PC or PET+PC.

Xenoy resins can be created with recycled post-consumer PBT plastic, consuming less energy and yielding less carbon dioxide (CO_{2}) in their manufacturing than traditional resins.
