= Colt Double Action =

A Colt Double Action (or Colt D. A. for short) is any of the double-action revolvers manufactured by the Colt's Manufacturing Company. The term is most commonly used for the historical 1877 and 1878 models, but it also may refer to the following firearms:

- Colt M1877
- Colt M1878
- Colt M1892
- Colt New Service
- Colt Cobra
- Colt Trooper
- Colt Python
- Colt Anaconda
- Colt King Cobra
