= Danish shooting movement =

Sporting association

The Danish shooting movement was a movement in that started in Denmark around the 1860s after inspiration from the National Rifle Association of the United Kingdom (NRA UK) which had been founded in 1859 to provide voluntary firearms training for the purpose of national defense.

Although having started out as a part of the national defense, the Danish shooting movement in the later years have had a strong focus on sport shooting. The largest sport event Landsstævnet has been held since 1862, and now consists of not only shooting, but also sports like gymnastics, football, badminton, dog agility, lawn bowls, handball and beach volleyball. The Landsstævne is currently held every fourth year, and the last event was set to be held in 2021 at Svendborg. However it was postponed until 2022. The 2025 event will be held at Vejle.

== History ==
The Danish shooting movement is considered to have started when H. P.V. Mønster, a Danish artillery captain and school officer at the Royal Danish Military Academy, wrote an article in the newspaper Fedrelandet (lit. "The Fatherland") 19 January 1861 where he gave his support to the shooting movement and sparked an interest in the Danish people. His appeal was however first and foremost intended toward landowners, since he found it hard to imagine a nationwide organisation. The article resulted in a committee being appointed, which merely a month after the article had been published gave a recommendation to create shooting associations in all parts of Denmark with the goal of providing the Danish population with rifle shooting training. The Centralcomitéen til oprettelse af skytteforeninger was established 10 February 1861. The association De Danske Skytteforeninger was subsequently founded in 1862.

During the same time as the so-called riffelforeninger (rifle clubs) were established in Denmark, similar clubs promoting the shooting cause were also created in Norway as folkevæpningssamlag and in Sweden as skarpskytteföreningar. The rifle clubs often had a strong connection to the folkehøyskolene (lit. people colleges). In Denmark, in particularly many rifle clubs were created after 1864 following the defeat in the Second Schleswig War.

Danish shooters had participated in the first modern olympics in 1896, but De Danske Skytteforeninger (DDS) was more focused on the national defense and national shooting competitions compared to international sport shooting. The Dansk Skytte Union (DSU, literally Danish Shooting Union) was therefore established in 1913.

Gymnastics became a part of De Danske Skytteforeninger, and DDS therefore in 1919 changed name to De Danske Skytte- og Gymnastikforeninger (DDSG, literally the Danish Shooting and Gymnastics Associations). By the way, a competing gymnastics association called De Danske Gymnastikforeninger (the Danish Gymnastics Associations) was later founded in 1929. In 1930, DDS again changed its name, this time to De Danske Skytte-, Gymnastik- og Idrætsforeninger (DDSG&I, the Danish Shooting, Gymnastics and Sports Associations).

After the German invasion during World War II the rifle clubs were allowed to continue their activities, but only for valid members, and their rifle bolts also had to be stored by the police authorities between matches. In 1943 all firearms were confiscated by the Germans. When the firearms were to be returned in 1945 all long distance firearms were missing. Therefore, shooting activities immediately after the war only consisted of shooting on 15 and 50 meters, until DDSG&I successfully negotiated with Sweden to borrow 10,000 Carl Gustav model 98 Mauser-type rifles.

In 1947, field shooting was established as a new discipline under the name terrænskydning. In 1952, DDSG&I celebrated their 90 years anniversary. Having started from rifle shooting, DDSG&I in 1972/1973 also established pistol shooting as part of their competition program. Their main shooting event of the year, Landsstævnet, was broadcast on TV for the first time in 1971. In 1978 DDSG&I also incorporated field shooting with pistol as a competition program.

In November 1992, the new association the Danish Gymnastics and Sports Associations (DGI) was founded by merging De Danske Gymnastik- og Ungdomsforeninger (DDGU) and De Danske Skytte-, Gymnastik- og Idrætsforeninger (DDSG&I). In 2013 De Danske Skytteforeninger (DDS) also became a part of DGI.

== See also ==
- Swedish shooting movement
- De Danske Skytteforeninger, now part of the Danish Gymnastics and Sports Associations (DGI)
- Rekylkorps, numerous freikorps created in the beginning of the 1900s to support the Danish defense
- Folkevæpningssamlag, an association of voluntary rifle clubs in Norway during the 1880s and 1890s
