= Smith & Wesson Model 14 =

Double action revolver

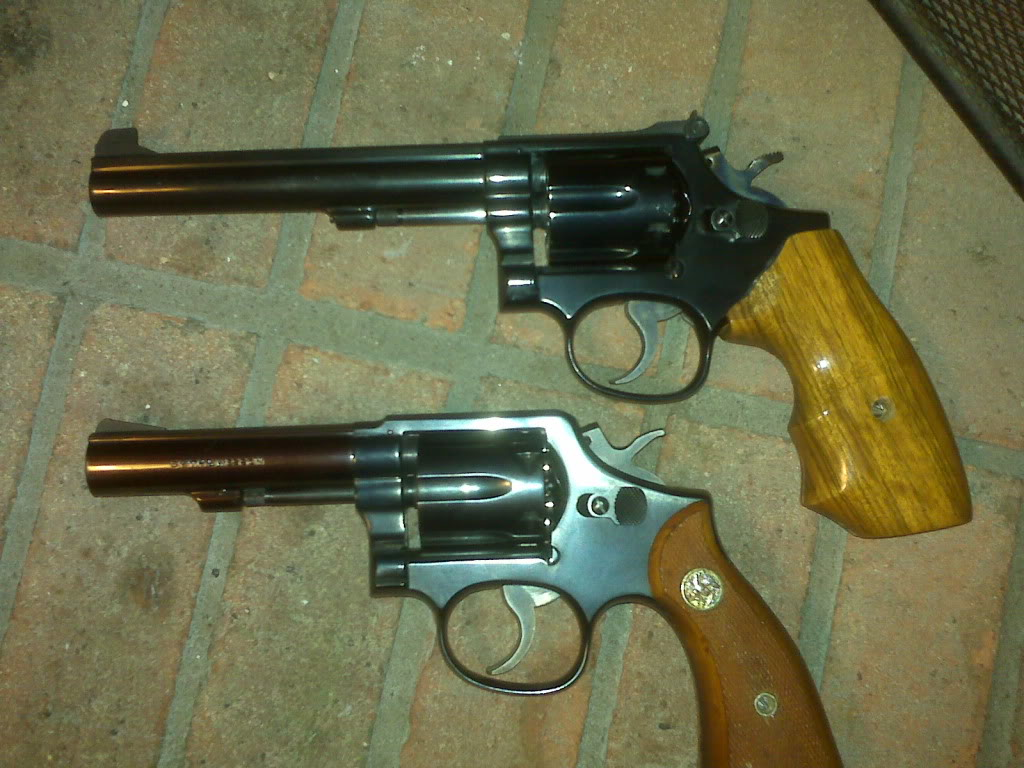
- Smith & Wesson Model 14-4 with 6" barrel (top) and Smith & Wesson Model 10-6 with 4" barrel (bottom)
- Type: Revolver
- Place of origin: United States

Production history
- Produced: 1947–1982, 1991–1999, 2009–present
- Variants: Model 14 Masterpiece Single-Action; Model 14 Classic

Specifications
- Length: 4 inches (100 mm); 5 inches (130 mm); 6 inches (150 mm); 8 3/8 inches (210 mm)
- Caliber: .38 Special
- Action: Double-action revolver
- Feed system: 6-round cylinder
- Sights: Adjustable open sights

The Smith & Wesson K-38 Target Masterpiece Revolver (Model 14) is a six-shot, double-action revolver with adjustable open sights, built on the medium-size "K" frame. When introduced, it was intended for bullseye target shooting competition of the type then most common on the United States, which is today called NRA Precision Pistol, specifically in the "centerfire" category. It is chambered for the .38 Special cartridge. It is one of three similar models that Smith & Wesson offered, the other two being the very similar K-32 Target Masterpiece (Model 16) chambered for the .32 S&W Long cartridge and, for the "smallbore" or "22" category competition, the K-22 Target Masterpiece (Model 17) chambered for the .22 Long Rifle cartridge. Most K-38 revolvers were fitted with a 6 in (150 mm) or 8 3/8 in (210 mm) barrel. A small batch were made with 4 in (100 mm) barrels, and even fewer were made with 5 in (130 mm) barrels. First produced in 1947 and originally known as the K-38 Target Masterpiece, it was numbered the Model 14 in 1957 when all Smith & Wesson guns were given numerical model numbers. It is built on the same frame as the seminal Smith & Wesson Model 10 ("Military and Police") revolver.

Although the K-38 was intended for paper target shooting, it was authorized for duty with the Los Angeles Police Department in the 1960s and early 1970s.

== Variants ==
The Model 14 Masterpiece Single-Action was available in 1961 and 1962. It came with a 6 in (150 mm) barrel and functioned in single-action only. It was otherwise identical to the rest of the Model 14s.

Smith & Wesson also released nickel-plated and blued-steel versions of the Model 14 in their "Classics" line. Both versions have been discontinued. Other than the finishes, the revolvers were identical with 6 in (150 mm) barrels, a pinned Patridge front sight, a micro-adjustable rear sight, and wood grips.

During the years 1965 - 1968 a serial number range of the Model 14-2 was acquired by the Dayton Gun Headquarters of Dayton, Ohio. Smith and Wesson allowed this gun distributor to block a number of serial numbers for a special run of 14-2 handguns. These handguns were distinctive in that they were all Model 14-2, 4-inch revolvers with a Baughman front sight and a mixture of standard or target hammers, triggers and stocks. The "Dayton" guns are a hybrid involving a shortened Model 14 barrel with a Model 15 sight. The Dayton guns were made in four separate blocks of serial numbers. They are: 1) K623337 - K623737 (401 pieces); 2) K623857 - K624496 (640 pieces); 3) K660288 - K661087 (800 pieces); 4) K661389 - K 661585 (197 pieces) for a total of 2038 pieces; during years 1965–1968.

Besides the aforementioned "Dayton Guns" and as noted in the beginning of this article, other 4-inch barreled models were produced. Specifically a group of these revolvers were ordered with 4-inch barrels for the Kansas City, Missouri Police Commission. This information has been verified through Smith and Wesson Archive letters of authenticity. These revolvers were slightly different having a standard barrel thickness as opposed to the heavy barrels displayed on the "Dayton Guns". "Bill Jabin notation"

== Users ==
- United States
  - Los Angeles Police Department

== See also ==
- Smith & Wesson Model 15
- Smith & Wesson Model 17
- List of firearms
