= Smith & Wesson Model 17 =

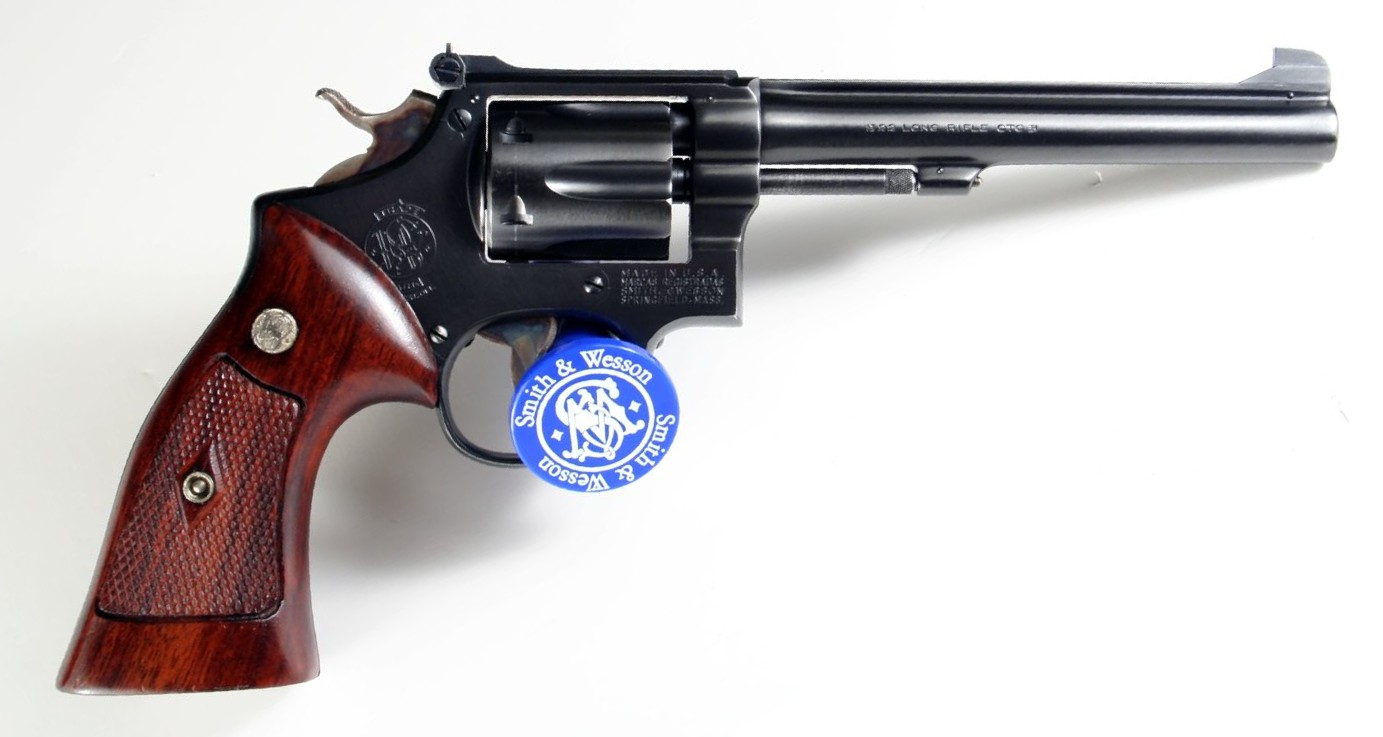
- Smith & Wesson Model 17 K-22 revolver
- Type: Revolver
- Place of origin: United States

Production history
- Designed: 1947
- Manufacturer: Smith & Wesson
- Variants: Model 617

Specifications
- Barrel length: 6 in (150 mm)
- Cartridge: .22 Long Rifle
- Action: Double-action revolver
- Feed system: 6 round (Model 17 or earlier 617), or 10 round (Later model 617) cylinder

The Smith & Wesson K-22 Target Masterpiece Revolver (Model 17) is a six-shot, double-action revolver with adjustable open sights, built on the medium-size "K" frame. When introduced, it was intended for bullseye target shooting competition of the type then most common on the United States, which is today called NRA Precision Pistol, specifically in the "smallbore" or "22" category. It is chambered for the .22 Long Rifle cartridge. It is one of three similar models that Smith & Wesson offered, the other two being intended for the "centerfire" category, the K-32 Target Masterpiece (Model 16) chambered for the .32 S&W Long cartridge and the K-38 Target Masterpiece (Model 14) chambered for the .38 Special cartridge. Most K-22 revolvers were fitted with a 6 in (150 mm) or 8 3/8 in (210 mm) barrel, but other lengths have been produced. First produced in 1947 and originally known as the K-22 Target Masterpiece, it was numbered the Model 17 in 1957 when all Smith & Wesson guns were given numerical model numbers. It is built on the same frame as the seminal Smith & Wesson Model 10 ("Military and Police") revolver.

== History ==
Smith & Wesson's Models 16 and 17 have their origins with the company's Pre-World War 2 Hand Ejector series in the 1930s. These two revolver models debuted as companion pieces known as the Models K-32 and K-22 after World War 2. The K-32 Masterpiece (Model 16) debuted in 1935 and was chambered in .32 S&W Long caliber. Production ceased during World War 2 and the revolver was reintroduced in 1947 along with the K-22 Masterpiece (Model 17) in .22 Long Rifle caliber.

The Model 16 was dropped from production in 1983 due to the declining popularity of the .32 S&W Long caliber and the Model 17 was discontinued in 1998 as the company focused less on blued steel revolvers at the time.

== Design ==
The Model 17 has an adjustable rear sight and a pinned Patridge style front sight. It was designed as a target revolver and could be ordered in the 1960's from S&W with "The Three T's" : Target Trigger, Target Hammer and Target Grips. Standard barrel lengths were 4", 6" and 8 3/8". The 4" model 17-6 is infrequently seen, as S&W produced the almost identical, 4" barreled Model 18. The Model 18 was a Model 17 copy- except the 4" barrel was tapered whereas the Model 17's 4" barrel was not.

In 1990, S&W also shipped the Model 17 featuring a 4", 6" or 8 3/8" full under lug barrel. The "under lug" was a solid, blued steel, circular rod, cast as part of the barrel, and running under the barrel from the front of the cylinder yoke to the muzzle's end. The under lug not only enclosed the ejector rod, it also added considerable weight to the gun itself. The under lug model shipped with a special round-butt wood grip that featured inletted finger grooves. The 4" Model 17 Under Lug is infrequently seen and quite possibly manufactured as an afterthought using factory shortened 6" or 8 3/8" under lug barrels.

== Derivatives ==
=== Model 18 & 617 ===
The Smith & Wesson Model 18 (or the 22 Combat Masterpiece) was built on S&W's "K" Frame, (Smith & Wesson's designation for 'medium frame' firearms.) It was a tapered, 4-inch-barreled, double-action revolver, with adjustable open sights, chambered for the .22 long rifle. Many believe the Model 18 was designed as a training weapon for law enforcement officials and others who primarily carried Model 10's, 15's and 19's-.38 Special and .357 caliber revolvers. The Model 18 (like the Model 17) operates and handles in a similar fashion to these law enforcement models of the day; and closely shares the size, weight, grips, internal mechanism, and operation of several popular "K" framed revolvers like the Model 10 (.38 Cal.), Model 13 (.38 & .357 Cal.), Model 14 (.38 Cal.), Model 15 (.38 Cal.) and Model 19 (.38 & .357 Cal.) The only significant difference was the Model 18's .22 caliber.

With the introduction of the Model 17 with full under lug barrels, Smith & Wesson also began production of the .22 caliber Model 617. This is the stainless steel version of the blued steel Model 17 .22 LR; however, all Model 617's have full under lug barrels. Offered in the same three barrel lengths as the Model 17, the 617 is still in current production and is shipped with rubber grips. The Model 617 is found with a six-shot or ten-shot, steel .22 LR cylinder. The only exception is the early production Model 617-2 which was made with a ten-shot, aluminium alloy .22 LR cylinder. Later "dash 2" 617's were shipped with stainless steel cylinders.

=== Model 53 ===
The Smith & Wesson Model 53 was introduced in 1961 in the .22 Jet caliber. It is a revolver of six round capacity built on the medium K frame using a double action trigger. The .22 Jet cartridge had a listed velocity of 2460 fps using a 40 grain bullet, but actually reached 1700-1800 fps in the revolver. The Model 53 can also fire the .22 Short, Long, and Long rifle cartridges using chamber inserts. The hammer had a two position firing pin to allow it to be switched from rimfire to centerfire as needed.

The handgun came with target handgrips and sights and in barrel lengths of 4-, 6-, and 8.3-inches.

In the late 1950s there was considerable interest in the shooting community for revolvers chambered in various .22 caliber wildcat cartridges. Smith & Wesson sought to take advantage of this by unveiling a cartridge known as the .22 Remington CFM (Centerfire Magnum) cartridge or the .22 Remington Jet and chambered a version of the Model 17 in this caliber designating it the Model 53.

The Model 53 was manufactured from 1960 to 1974.

== Present State ==
The Model 17 was discontinued in 1998, but in 2009 was reintroduced as the Model 17 "Masterpiece" due to a resurgence in the popularity of vintage Smith & Wesson revolvers. The company chose approximately fifteen previously discontinued models to produce once again. This was done under the "Classics" category of S&W's current offerings. As of late 2025 the Model 17 "Masterpiece" was discontinued again.

== See also ==
- List of firearms
