= Colt Anaconda =

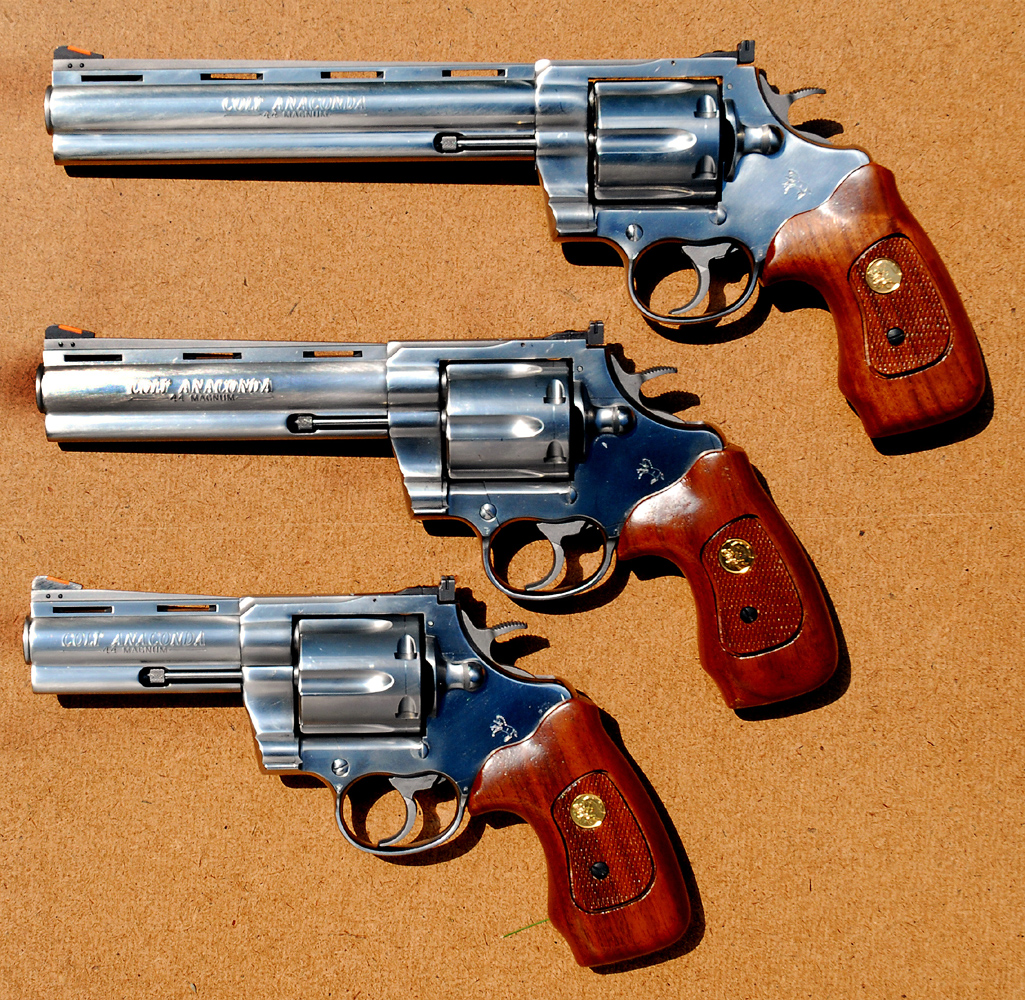
- Original line of .44 Magnum Colt Anaconda in three barrel lengths
- Type: Revolver
- Place of origin: United States

Production history
- Manufacturer: Colt's Manufacturing Company
- Produced: 1990–2003; 2021–present
- Variants: Kodiak; Anaconda Hunter; Anaconda Custom Ported; Anaconda Camo

Specifications
- Mass: 47 oz, 1.3kg (4-inch barrel); 53 oz, 1.5kg (6-inch barrel); 59 oz, 1.7kg (8-inch barrel)
- Length: 9 5/8 in, 240 mm (4-inch barrel); 11 5/8 in, 300 mm (6-inch barrel); 13 5/8 in, 350 mm (8-inch barrel)
- Barrel length: 4-inch barrel (102 mm); 6-inch barrel (153 mm); 8-inch barrel (203 mm)
- Cartridge: .44 Special; .44 Magnum; .45 Colt
- Action: Double-action
- Feed system: Six round cylinder
- Sights: Adjustable open iron sights

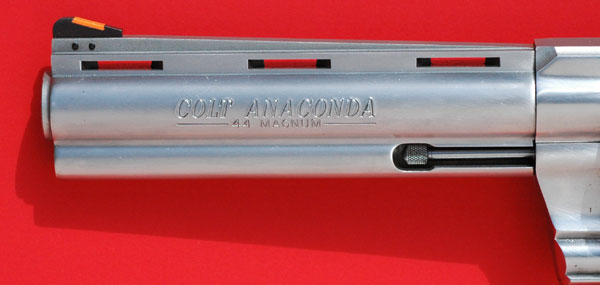
Anaconda rollmark

The Colt Anaconda is a large frame double-action revolver featuring a full length under-barrel ejection-rod lug and six round cylinder, designed and produced by the Colt's Manufacturing Company in 1990. Chambered for the powerful .44 Magnum and .45 Colt centerfire ammunition cartridges, the Anaconda marked the Hartford, Connecticut firm's first foray into the popular large-bore Magnum pistol market.

== Development ==
Built on a new and heavier ‘MM' frame, the Anaconda was brought out to compete with .44 Magnum contemporaries such as the Smith & Wesson Model 29, the Sturm, Ruger & Co. Redhawk and Blackhawk, and the Dan Wesson Firearms Model 44. Considering that many of these models had been marketed and sold for fully 35 years upon its introduction, the Anaconda was a very late entry into the large-bore handgun market. Unlike most other pistols introduced in the 1980s and 1990s, the Anaconda was never offered with a carbon steel blued finish, but was available only in stainless steel. When originally introduced, Anacondas were plagued with poor accuracy, but changes to the barrels quickly corrected the problems to the point that Colt billed its new pistol as among the most accurate .44 Magnum revolvers in production. Anaconda revolvers were primarily marketed for sport enthusiast shooters and hunters, as they are too large for law enforcement general duty use or concealed-carry, although made-to-order limited production versions of the gun continued to be available from the Colt custom gun shop until approximately 2003. In 2021, Colt resumed production of the Anaconda, using a new design with a stronger frame and an oversized Python action.

== Features ==
Originally chambered for the .44 Magnum cartridge, in 1993 the Anaconda began to be offered in .45 Colt as well. Its fit and finish resembled an upsized King Cobra married to a ventilated-rib barrel reminiscent of the Python's. Initially marketed with a satin brushed stainless finish, a highly polished mirror-like option known as "Ultimate Stainless" was catalogued for a time through the Colt Custom Shop. Anacondas came equipped with four, six, or eight inch barrels, neoprene synthetic rubber finger-grooved combat-style grips with nickel colored 'Rampant Colt' medallions, large target type hammers and triggers, as well as open iron sights with a red insert front and fully adjustable white outline rear. Some models were factory drilled and tapped for telescopic sight mounting, while others shipped with recoil reducing Magna-Ported barrels. The trigger actions on these guns are rated as very high-quality, and the heavy-duty solid construction and weight tends to absorb recoil, making the Anaconda relatively easy to shoot with heavy loads.

=== Kodiak ===
Introduced in 1993, the Kodiak was similar to the Anaconda in that it was constructed entirely of stainless steel, but offered the additional features of a recoil-reducing factory magna-ported barrel and unfluted cylinder.

There were 2000 Kodiaks made as a special run of Anacondas, breaking away from their long history of naming revolvers after snakes. A special run of 1000 King Cobras was made about the same time, having the same Magna-Ported barrel and unfluted cylinder and were called the Grizzly. There was an uncatalogued 5-inch (130 mm) barrel version of the Anaconda, with reportedly less than 150 made. These 5-inch (130 mm) versions typically sell for high prices when they are encountered. Additionally, Colt made an extremely low number of 4-inch (100 mm) barrel Anacondas chambered in .45 Colt.

In 2024, Colt reintroduced the Kodiak, a variant of the newer Anaconda (reintroduced in 2021), with the same style of Magna-ported barrel and unfluted cylinder of the originals, available with a 4.25-inch barrel.

== See also ==
- Colt Diamondback
