= De Danske Skytteforeninger =

Danish sports organization

De Danske Skytteforeninger DDS (The Danish Shooting Associations) founded in 1862 was Denmark's oldest sports organization until it was merged with Danske Gymnastik- & Idrætsforeninger 1 January 2013. After the merger DDS was split in two with DGI Skydning (DGI Shooting) administering competitions, weapons registration, political and organizational issues, while Skydebaneforeningen Danmark (Shooting Range Association of Denmark) handles advice and financial support to clubs and shooting ranges.

The headquarters are in Vingsted, between Vejle and Billund, and has one of Northern Europe's largest and most comprehensive shooting ranges. In 1994 a major sports event (Landsstaevne) was held in Svenborg with over 40,000 participants. These included shooters from the DDS and The British Schools Shooting team (BSSRA) who took part in a Juniors shooting match. Matches between the two organisations took place each year at Bisley and every two years in Denmark.

The Danish shooting movement began 19 January 1861 with posts by Captain H. P.V. Mønster in the newspaper Fædrelandet ("Fatherland") where he agitated for establishing rifle clubs inspired by what had similarly been done by the National Rifle Association in the United Kingdom. The article was well received, and already 10 February 1861 the Centralcomitéen til oprettelse af skytteforeninger was founded in a meeting in Copenhagen. The association De Danske Skytteforeninger was subsequently founded in 1862.

== See also ==
- Danish Gymnastics and Sports Associations (DGI)
- Frivilliga Skytterörelsen
- Det frivillige Skyttervesen
