= Colt Trooper =

Colt Trooper 68820
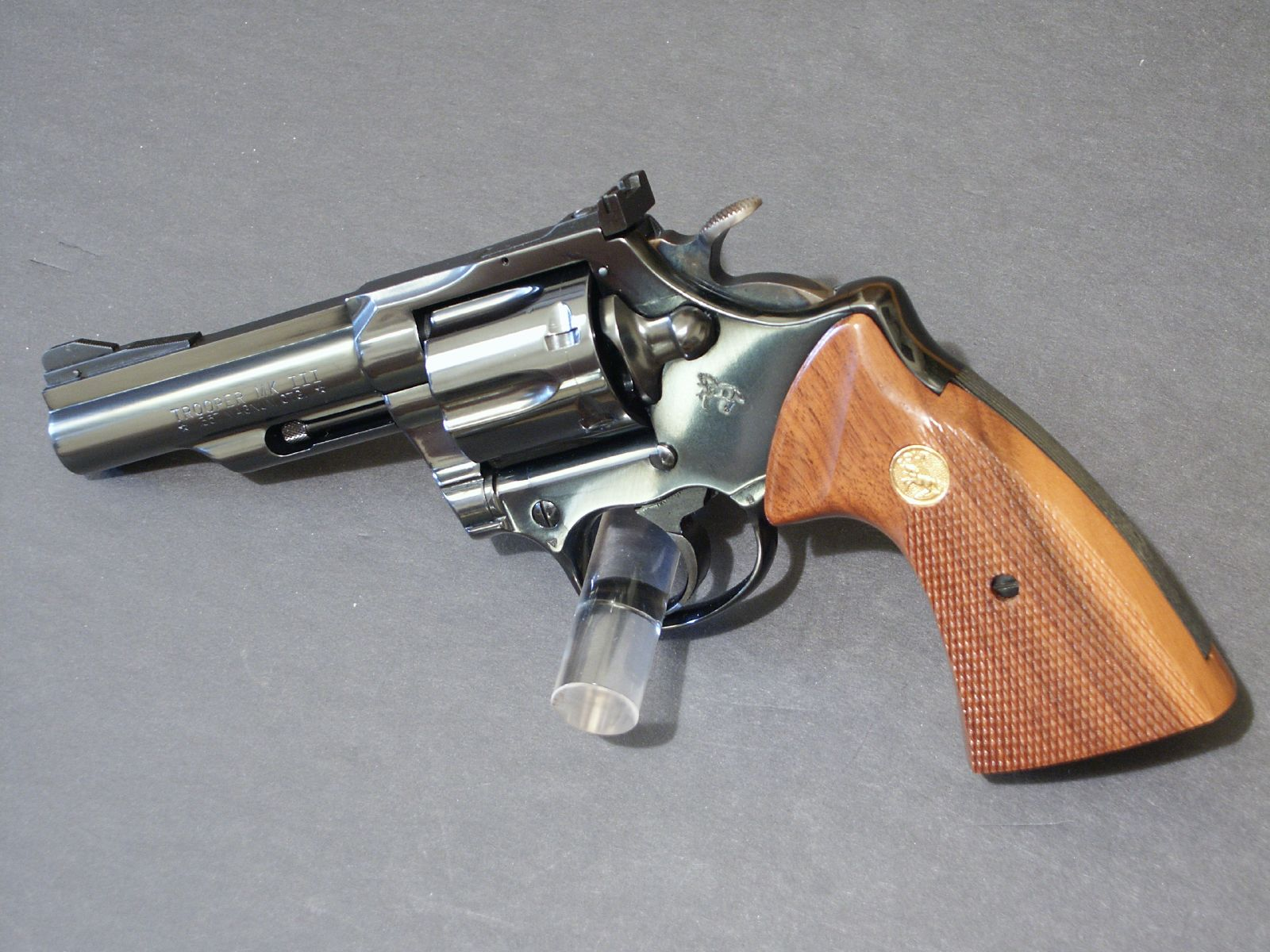
- Colt Trooper Mk III with a 4" barrel
- Type: Revolver
- Place of origin: United States

Production history
- Manufacturer: Colt's Manufacturing Company
- Produced: 1953–1985

Specifications
- Barrel length: 4–8 in (102–203 mm)
- Cartridge: .22 Long Rifle.22 Winchester Magnum Rimfire.38 Special.357 Magnum
- Action: Double-action
- Feed system: Six round cylinder
- Sights: Iron sights

The Colt Trooper is a medium frame, double-action revolver featuring a six-round cylinder, chambered for .22 Long Rifle, .22 Winchester Magnum Rimfire, .38 Special, and .357 Magnum caliber cartridges. Designed as a less expensive alternative to the upscale Colt .357 and the later Colt Python and Colt King Cobra, it was marketed to law enforcement agencies as well as civilians.

== Development and history ==
Introduced to the firearms market by the Colt's Manufacturing Company in 1953, the Trooper and its high-end cousin, the .357 Magnum, were introduced with the intention of addressing the medium frame revolver market, as law enforcement officers had long complained about the weight of earlier models. The two guns were seen as ideal in size and handling characteristics for the .38 Special and its big brother the .357. Offered as an alternative and competitor to Smith & Wesson’s Model 28 "Highway Patrolman", the Colts were lighter and handier.

== Variants ==
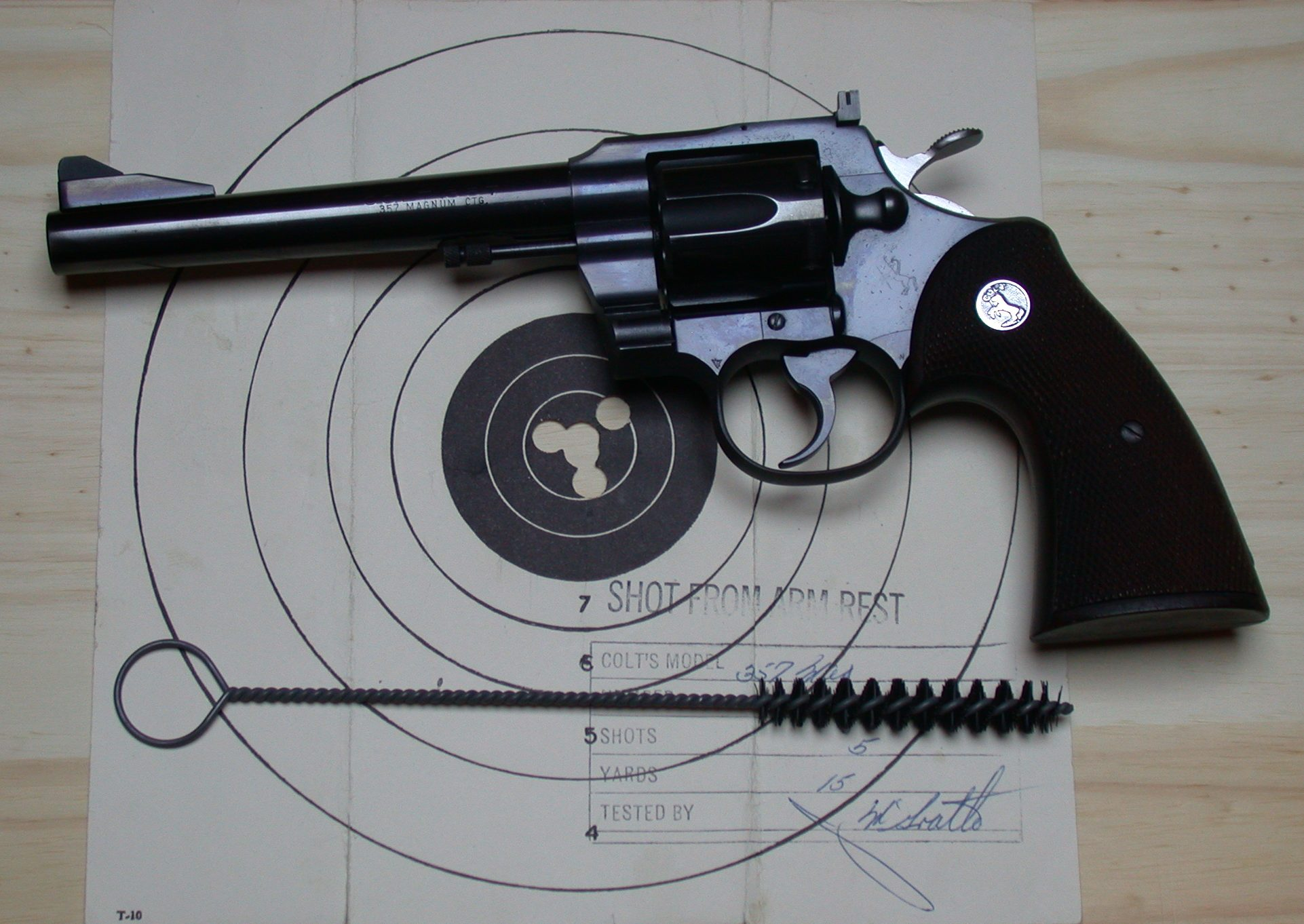
Early .357 Magnum model

=== Trooper ===
==== 1953 – 1969 ====
The original Trooper was a heavy-barreled version of the Officers Model Match and was based on Colt's medium Iframe. It was offered in .22 Long Rifle and .38 Special chamberings. Manufactured with fine carbon steel, it was available in both blued and nickel-plated finishes. Early blued Troopers boasted a two-tone color scheme with dull Colt Royal Blue on the flat surfaces and a black bead blasted texture on the edges and cylinder flutes. Both Target and Service versions of the Trooper were available, the Target models sporting hand-filling Walnut grips, larger and wider target hammers, and adjustable iron sights. Service versions featured smaller more basic hammers and stocks, and fixed sights. Barrel lengths available included four inch in .22 caliber and four and six inch in .38 Special; the .22 was intended as a ‘practice’ weapon and also came in a six inch. All the Troopers from this series had hammer mounted firing pins. The Trooper was targeted at the entry-level and Law enforcement service-level segment of the firearms market while the highly polished and expensive 357 model revolver was intended to be their premium offering. Both models shared the same forged and labor-intensive hand-fitted internal lockwork.

After the introduction of the more expensive Python in 1955, Colt discontinued the basic .38 Special Trooper in 1961, and to did away with the .357 moniker, so they renamed it Trooper. The new offering retained the .357 magnum chambering and frame-mounted firing pin, but kept the entry-level revolver's more subdued finish. The Trooper continued to be offered in .22 Long rifle, and like all .357 Magnums, offered the capability of firing .38 Special ammunition as well.

=== MK III ===
==== Trooper ====
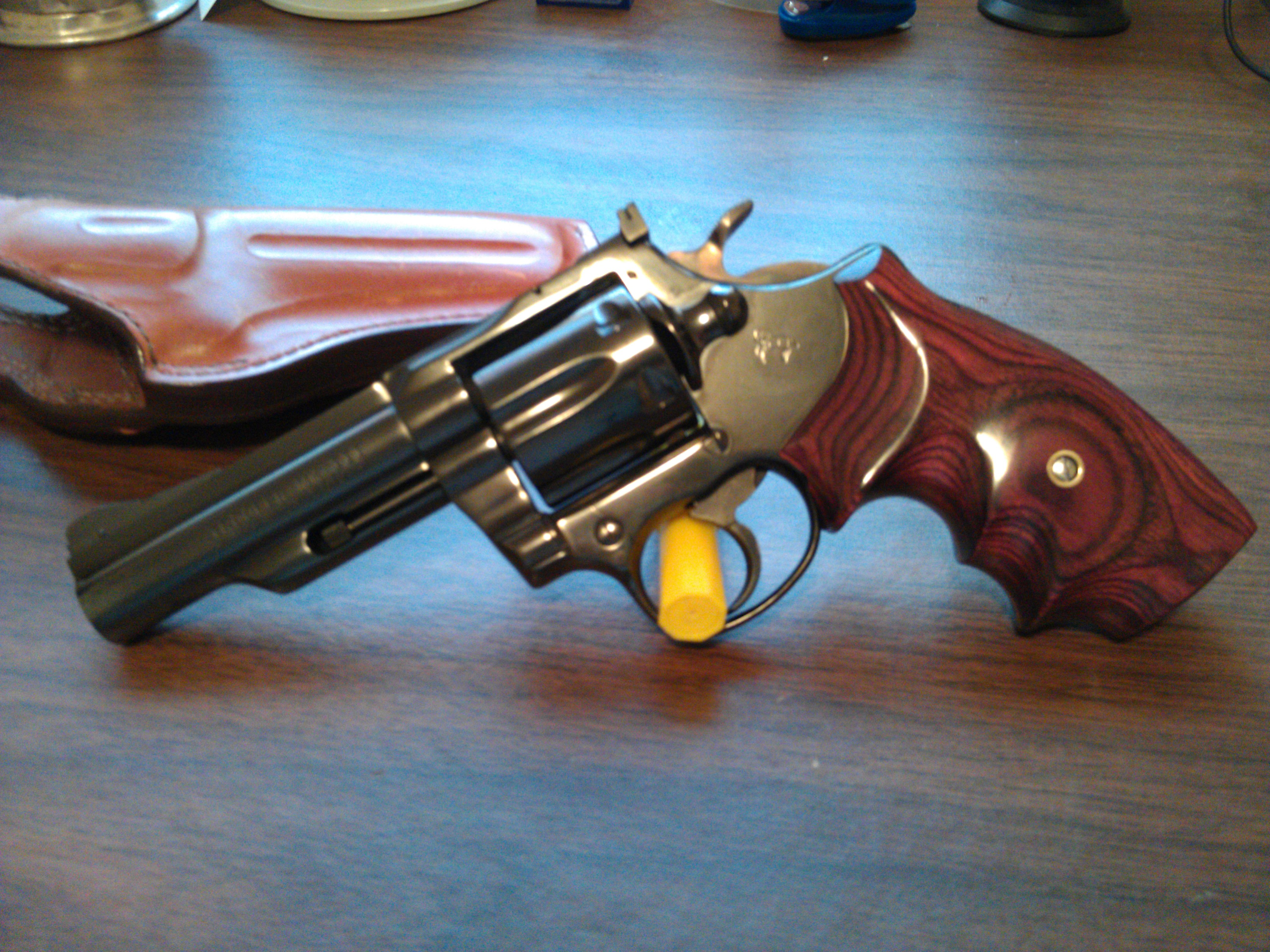
Colt Trooper Mk III, (circa 1980) with a 4" barrel and aftermarket wood grips

In the late 1960s, Colt began to be concerned with a decline in its market share because of price increases brought about by the high labor costs inherent in its manufacturing processes. In response, an entirely new product line of revolvers dubbed the MK III series debuted in 1969. Intended to be the first major advancement of Colt's designs since the beginning of the 20th century, the MK IIIs used a new ‘J’ frame and had no parts interchangeability with older models. The new revolvers employed transfer-bar lockwork system, so that the revolver could fire only if the trigger was deliberately pulled completely to the rear. The springs used in the Mark III internals were also an improvement. Unlike the older flat style, they were coiled and made entirely of corrosion-resistant stainless steel. The .357 Magnum Trooper was the premier offering of the new product line, featuring a heavy barrel with a solid top rib as well as a shroud which protected the ejection rod. A new ammunition chambering option, the .22 Winchester Magnum Rimfire, also became available for the first time. The MK III series incorporated a number of models, several of which were updates of existing designs. Classic models included the venerable Colt Official Police chambered in .38 Special as the basic/entry-level offering, and the Trooper in .357 Magnum. New members of the line up included the Lawman, Metropolitan Police, and Border Patrol. The MK III series was discontinued in 1983.

==== Lawman ====
Video review of the Colt Lawman MK III revolver

The Lawman was a .357 Magnum 'service grade' or 'police issue' version of the Trooper, and somewhat of an economy model intended for law enforcement looking for cheaper sidearms or private armed security. The Lawman came with fixed sights and no ejector rod shroud. Early Lawman revolvers came with thinner hammers and narrow triggers, but most Lawman revolvers come with the standard MK III Trooper hammers and triggers. Initial guns came with narrow service grips, but most come with larger target grips. Nickel finished guns came with Colt medallion-equipped Pachmayr "Signature" rubber grips. The Lawman came with a heavy barrel in lengths of two inch and four inch only. Early versions of the Lawman with the two inch barrel had an exposed ejector rod; but later models with the two inch barrel have an attribute unique to the Lawman, the only Lawman barrel equipped with shrouded ejector rod, resembling something of a larger third-generation Colt Detective Special. As with the MK III Trooper, the MK III Lawman was produced from 1969 to 1983.

=== MK V ===
1982 - 1985 As with the MK III, the Mark V series was an entirely new product line of models which included Official Police, Lawman, and Trooper variants. The MK V series was based on a new, slightly smaller ‘V’ frame, similar in size to Smith & Wesson's ‘K’ frame. Changes from the MK III models were minor and many parts remained identical. Internally, Colt did away with the sintered iron MK III lockwork in favor of cast parts, and improved the trigger action with new components and a shorter hammer fall. These improvements made the MK V triggers smoother, while the diminished lock times increased accuracy. Exterior modifications included a compact grip frame with rounded grips; other changes were engineering-based with the goal of simplifying and facilitating production.

- Trooper: Options remained the same as they were with the MK III models, but the launch of the MK Vs denoted the initiation of a ventilated barrel rib option similar to the Python. The legacy solid rib remained available as well.
- Lawman: External options and finishes for the MK V Lawman remained identical to the MK III version.
- Whitetailer: A variant of very limited production which was intended for the hunting market, the Whitetailer came equipped with an eight-inch barrel and Telescopic sight mounting rings.
- Boa: An extremely limited variant produced only in 1985 for the Lew Horton distribution company. It combined the high polished bluing and ventilated barrel rib of the Python with the frame of the MK V.
- Peacekeeper: Parkerized low budget version of MK V, 4" and 6" barrel versions were made.

== Users ==
- USA: New York Police Department Colt Metropolitan Mk III
