= Folkevæpningssamlag =

Norwegian union of shooting associations

Folkevæpningssamlag or Folkevæbningssamlag (literally People's Armament Union) was a union of voluntary shooting associations that existed in Norway in the 1880s and 1890s. The union was established due to dissatisfaction with the official shooting association at that time called Centralforeningen for Udbrædelse af Legemsøvelser og Vaabenbrug (lit. The Association for Physical Exercise and use of Firearms)

At the start of the 1880s, member dissatisfaction in the Centralforeningen increased since the members had no influence over the association. The first Folkevæpningssamlag was established after initiative by Inntrøndelag school manager Ole Five on a meeting with representatives from the shooting clubs in Northern Trondhjems amt on 29 January 1881. The following year, the Folkevæpningssamlag had clubs in 12 of the 20 amts in Norway, and a board was established in Kristiania between 6 and 8 February 1882, with Ole Five as chairman.

The primary goal of the Folkevæpningssamlag's was to strengthen Norway's defense capabilities, especially by training the people in shooting and by ensuring that modern firearms became widespread. Already in 1881, the Storting had granted a smaller sum for purchasing firearms and ammunition, and in 1882 a larger sum was granted. However, the Regjeringrefused to approve the grant. This disagreement was a key part in the impeachment of the Selmer Ministry in 1884.

The member numbers of the Folkevæpningssamlag's increased from 13 000 in 1882 to 18 000 (distributed over 586 shooting clubs) in 1890. In 1892, a Royal Order in Council (kongelig resolusjon) ordered a strengthening in the collaboration between the Folkevæpningssamlag's and the Norwegian Army. The Folkevæpningssamlag's were allowed to borrow firearms from the army, under the condition that the Folkevæpningssamlags hired shooting instructors with military education, and that military officers were allowed to inspect the training. At the same time, the Storting increased their grants for purchasing rifles.

In 1893, all rifle shooting clubs in Norway were gathered under one organisation when the Folkevæpningssamlags and the shooting part of Centralforeningen together formed the National Rifle Association of Norway (Det frivillige skyttervesen, DFS). Still today, this organisation is the largest sport shooting association in Norway.

== See also ==
- The Swiss shooting movement, started in the 1820s
- The British shooting movement, started in the late 1850s
- The Swedish shooting movement, started in the 1860s
