= Swedish shooting movement =

Swedish voluntary defense movement

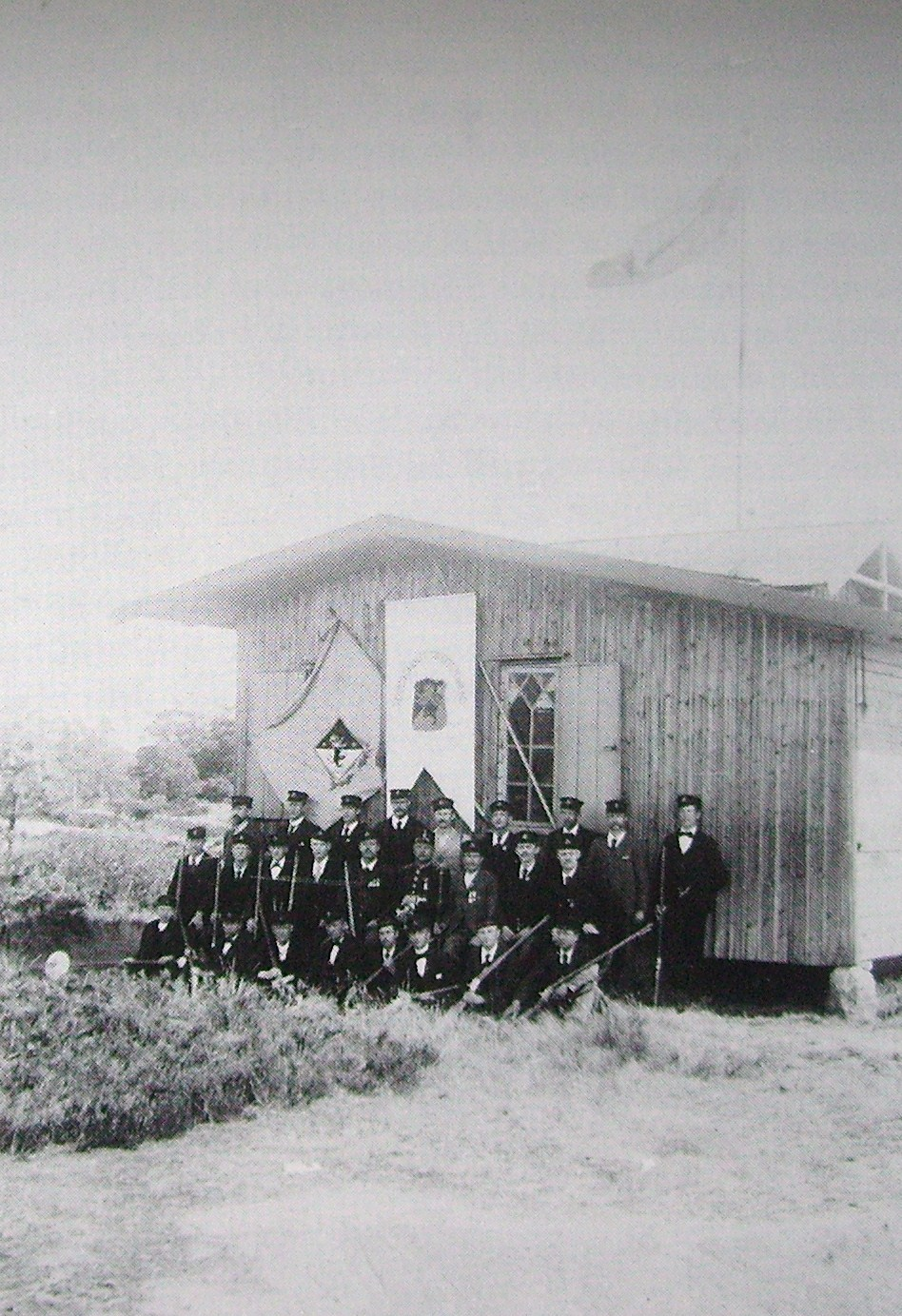
"Shooting pavilion" (skyttepaviljong) at Hjortmosen in Sweden, 1889

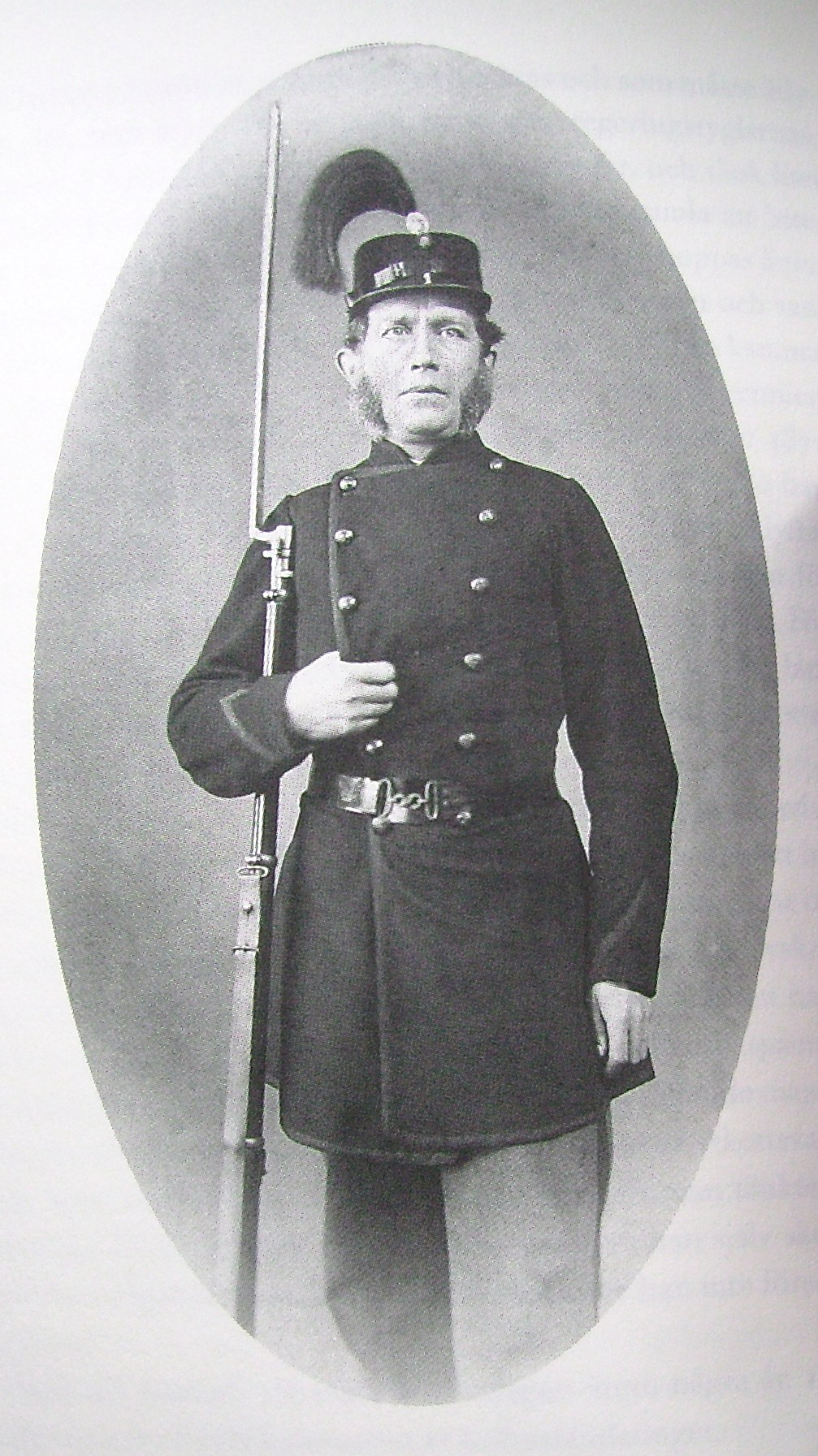
Corporal S.A. Hedlund from the voluntary shooting movement (skarpskytterörelsen).

The Swedish shooting movement (Swedish: Skarpskytterörelsen) was a voluntary defense movement which started in Sweden in the 1860s inspired by similar foreign movements like the National Rifle Association of the United Kingdom and the Schweizerischer Schützenverein in Switzerland. The movement lasted until 2009 when the association Frivilliga Skytterörelsen (lit. the Voluntary Shooting Movement) was dissolved and merged into the Swedish Shooting Sport Federation.

== Background ==
Among the initiators of the Swedish shooting movement were well known authors, such as Viktor Rydberg and Sven Adolf Hedlund in Gothenburg, as well as August Blanche and Lars Johan Hierta in Stockholm. These men also fought for the representation reform in Sweden, universal suffrage and the folk high schools.

The initiators regarded the Swedish defense as in poor condition, and the populations will to fight as weak. At the time, Sweden had a professional standing army through the allotment system, but the initiators instead wanted general conscription combined with a voluntary armament by citizens, similar to what was the case in Switzerland. The first Swedish rifle association was created in Gothenburg and became the standard for how to structure an association.

== History ==
The shooting movement in Sweden started as a popular movement. People from all parts of the society gathered around the shooting, and there was a patriotic atmosphere. The rifle clubs had a democratic structure and was run by enthusiasts, while the government provided the shooting ranges. In 1864, there were already 239 rifle clubs with over 33 500 members in total.

The club Stockholmsföreningen in Stockholm was the largest, with 2,300 shooters, and as the club from the capital of Sweden they also arranged the yearly Swedish championship called riksskyttetävlingen. These competitions were held on a shooting range which today is situated in Jarlaplan in Vasastan, Stockholm. In 1868, in total 829 shooters from 86 Swedish rifle clubs participated. The championship lasted a whole week, and most of the competitors slept in dormitories provided by the hosting city. The best shooters were awarded monetary prizes as well as honorary awards given by the Swedish royal house, the hosting city and others who were interested.

From 1868, the shooting movement started providing firearms training for the youth. The young men and boys were dressed in uniforms during the exercises, and already after a year a force of 800 school boys was divided into two battalions, having their own officers and music bands. Shooting and exercises were held at the Ladugårdsgärdet in Stockholm during spring and summer. School trips by boat were also arranged to Järva krog north of Stockholm and to Uppsala. In September 1877, the first rifle shooting championship for school boys was conducted in Stockholm, with in total 400 boys attending the shooting range "Kaknäs skjutbanor". Afterwards the shooting activities spread to schools in the villages. In 1900, the Swedish state appropriated 4000 Swedish kronor to enable the rifle club "Stockholms Stads frivilliga skarpskytteförening" to build their own shooting range. The range was finished in 1906, and received the name "Store Bremmens skjutbanor".

Some years later the popularity of the shooting movement diminished some, and some shooters wanted to distance themselves from military use of firearms. After 1880, the rifle clubs officially became civilian. In 1903, the rifle clubs came together and created an association called skytteförbundens överstyrelse. This association since changed name to the Frivilliga Skytterörelsen (FSR, lit. "Voluntary shooting movement"), which had its own youth organisation called Ungdomsorganisation Skytte (UO). In 2009 both the FSR and UO were liquidated, and the remaining parts of the organisation was merged into the Swedish Shooting Sport Federation.

== See also ==
- Danish shooting movement
- Folkevæpningssamlag, an association of voluntary rifle clubs in Norway during the 1880s and 1890s
