= Field shooting =

Set of sport shooting disciplines

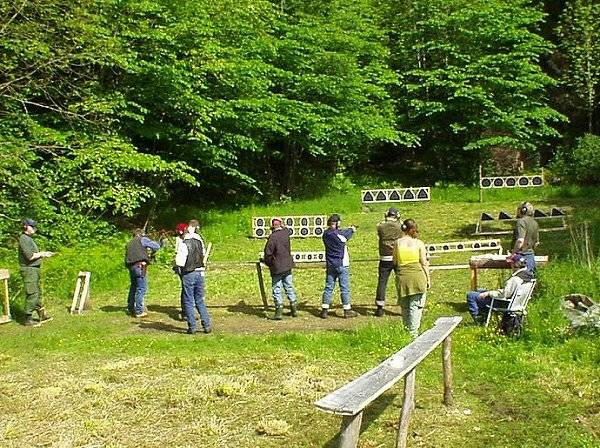
Handgun field-shooting in Arendal, Norway, 2007.

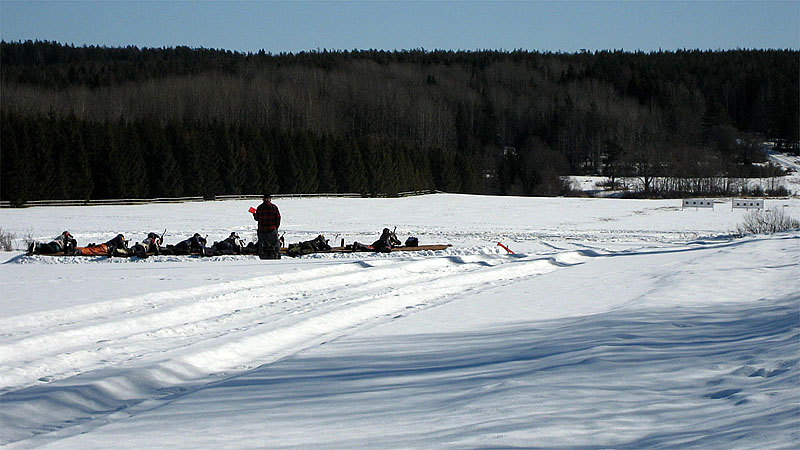
Rifle field-shooting in Sweden, 2012.

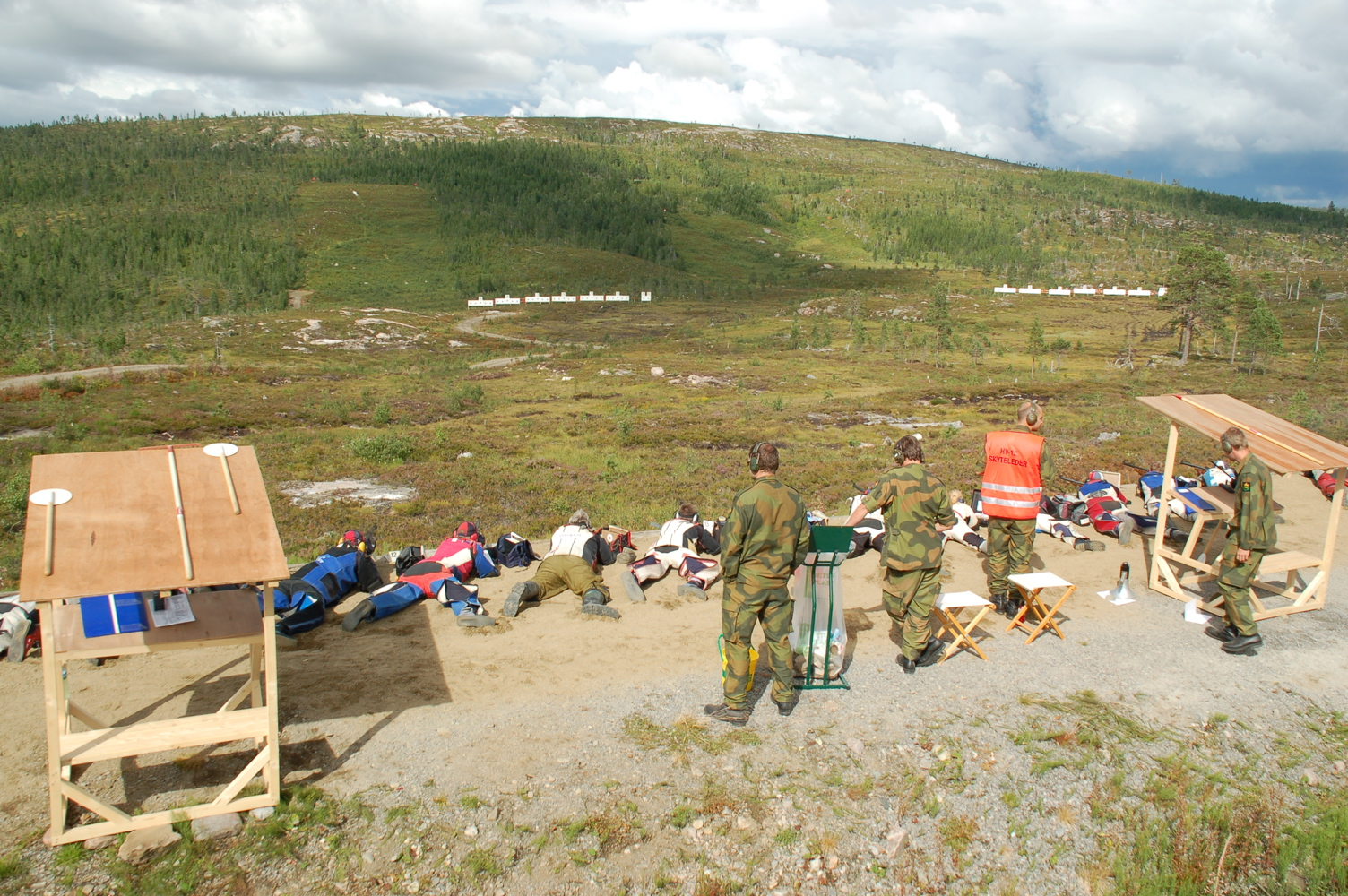
Rifle field-shooting at the Norwegian Landsskytterstevnet in 2007.

Field-shooting or terrain-shooting (Danish: terrænskydning, Norwegian: feltskyting, Swedish: fältskytte) refer to a set of pistol and rifle shooting sport disciplines that usually are shot from temporary shooting ranges in the terrain at varying (and sometimes unknown) distances, rather than at permanent shooting ranges at fixed distances.

Some examples of Field-Shooting disciplines are:

- Nordic handgun field-shooting competitions are shot with pistol and revolver in different classes depending on equipment, with classes up from small-bore .22 LR to large-bore .500 S&W Magnum. Matches are held outdoor throughout the year with varied shooting targets and distances, and are arranged by the Norwegian Shooting Association (NSF), the Danish Gymnastics and Sports Associations (DGI Shooting) and the Swedish Pistol Shooting Association (SPSF).
- Nordic rifle field-shooting are shot with either small-bore .22 LR cartridge at 100 meters, or intermediate (such as .223 Remington or 6mm BR) or battle rifle cartridges (such as the 6.5×55mm, .308 Winchester or the .30-06 Springfield) at distances from 100 to 650 meters. With 200 and 300 meters being ordinary shooting distance in Nordic Bullseye Rifle-Shooting, those targets placed well beyond 300 meters in Rifle Field-Shooting means that the competition format also can be classified as a long range shooting discipline. Matches are usually held in the winter season with varied targets, and are arranged by the National Rifle Association of Norway (DFS), the Danish Gymnastics and Sports Associations (DGI Shooting) and the Swedish Shooting Sport Association (SvSF).
- Swiss field shooting under the Swiss Shooting Sport Federation. The annual championship has been held for over 130 years, and is shot at the same time in several decentralized locations gathering up to 135,000 participants, perhaps making this event the largest shooting competition in the world
- Precision rifle competitions, like the Precision Rifle Series (PRS), is both a field and long range shooting discipline where rifles with intermediate or battle rifle cartridges are shot in the terrain at varying distances from about 10 to 1000 meters.
- Field target is an outdoor air gun discipline originating in the United Kingdom, but gaining popularity worldwide.

== See also ==
- Bullseye shooting
- Shooting sport
