= Smith & Wesson Model 52 =

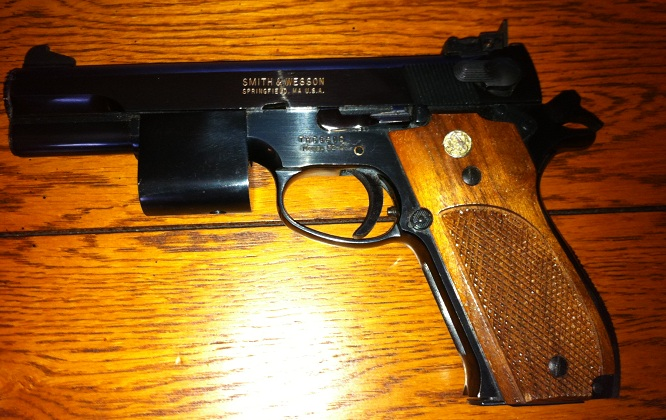
- S&W M52-2 with barrel weight
- Type: Semi-automatic pistol
- Place of origin: United States

Production history
- Produced: 1961–1993 (Model 52); 2000–2012 (Model 952)

Specifications
- Mass: 40 oz (1,100 g)
- Length: 8.55 in (217 mm)
- Barrel length: 5 in (130 mm)
- Cartridge: .38 Special (Model 52); 9×19 mm Parabellum (Model 952)
- Action: Short recoil, SA
- Rate of fire: Semi-automatic
- Feed system: 5-round single column, detachable box magazine

The Smith & Wesson Model 52, sometimes referred to as the 38 Master, is a semi-automatic pistol developed by Smith & Wesson for Bullseye shooting. It was one of the first semiautomatic pistols chambered in the rimmed .38 Special with flush-seated, full wadcutter bullets. The shape of the rimmed cartridge limited the magazine capacity to five rounds. A variant, known as the Model 952, in 9x19mm Parabellum, is still produced in limited quantities by Smith & Wesson's Performance Center. The Model 52 was discontinued in 1993 when the machinery to manufacture the pistol broke down and it was deemed too costly to replace.

== History ==
In 1961, Smith & Wesson introduced the Model 52 as a match-grade target pistol derived from the Smith & Wesson Model 39. It was chambered in .38 Special Wadcutter for the sport of Bullseye shooting.

The first version, known simply as the Model 52, retained the basic trigger mechanism of the Model 39, with the double-action function selectable via a simple frame-mounted setscrew, allowing the pistol to be fired in either single-action or double-action mode depending on the setscrew's adjustment.

In 1963, the Model 52-1 was introduced with a separately developed single-action trigger system and was manufactured until 1970, when it was succeeded by the Model 52-2. Changes to the 52-2 included an improved extractor and this version was manufactured for 23 years.

By 1992, the 30-year-old machinery used to make the Model 52 was showing signs of age and was starting to fail. Smith & Wesson decided against replacing it and the handgun was discontinued. The last model 52-2 was completed on July 23, 1993.

== Model 952 ==
The Smith & Wesson Model 952 was introduced in 2000 as a Performance Center pistol based on the Model 52 but chambered in 9mm. Enhancements included a 5-inch match-grade barrel, titanium-coated spherical barrel bushing, 9-round magazine, loaded chamber indicator and a slide-mounted decocking lever. An enhanced version was produced in 2004 and a long slide variant with a 6-inch barrel debuted in 2006. Smith & Wesson discontinued the Model 952 in 2012.
