= Swiss Shooting Sport Federation =

The Swiss Shooting Sport Federation, German: Schweizer Schiesssportverband (SSV), is an association for sport shooting in Switzerland. It was founded in its current form in 2001, but has roots as far back as in 1824. It is associated with the International Shooting Sport Federation and the European Shooting Confederation.

== History ==
The Schweizerischer Schützenverein (SSV) was founded in 1824 during the Swiss Restoration, in the wake of the collapse of the Helvetic Republic seen as a means to return to the martial prowess of the Old Swiss Confederacy, e.g. in Gottfried Kellers Das Fähnlein der sieben Aufrechten, where before the background of the Schützenfest of 1849 in Aarau, the shooting clubs are portrayed as a vigorous "radical" grass roots movement vital for the preservation of direct democracy in the young Swiss federal state.

The SSV became a member of Swiss Olympic Association in 1941.

In 1995, the SSV merged with the Swiss Revolver and Pistol Shooting Association (German: Schweizerische Revolver-und Pistolen-Schützenverbandes, SRPV).

In 2002 the Swiss Shooting Federation was founded in its current form through the merger of the Swiss Shooting Association (Schweizerischer Schützenverein, SSV) with the formerly independent Swiss Sport Shooting Association (Schweizerischer Sportschützenverband, SSSV) and the Swiss Workers Shooting Association (Schweizerischer Arbeiterschützen-Bund, SASB).

The Swiss Clay Shooting Federation (SCSF) is also a part of the SSPF.

== Demographics ==
The SSV has about 133,000 members, including about 60,825 licensed members. Its current president (as of 2026) is Luca Filippini. The SSV is a member of the International Shooting Sport Federation, the European Shooting Confederation, and the Swiss Olympic Association.

From its "radical" origins, the Swiss shooting clubs have evolved into a staunchly right wing/conservative milieu with considerable political leverage, although the 2002 fusion with explicitly socialist shooting associations (Arbeiterschützen) tends to emphasize the purely sportive character of the contemporary SSV, with lobbyist activity contained to issues directly connected with gun laws.

== Schützenfest ==
The SSV organizes the Eidgenössische Schützenfeste, currently in intervals of five years.

- 1834 Zurich
- 1838 St. Gallen
- 1843 Chur
- 1849 Aarau
- 1861 Stans
- 1867 Schwyz
- 1874 St. Gallen
- 1885 Bern Kirchenfeld
- 1890 Frauenfeld
- 1901 Lucerne
- 1904 St. Gallen
- 1907 Zurich
- 1910 Bern Wankdorffeld
- 1924 Aarau
- 1929 Bellinzona
- 1947 Chur
- 1954 Lausanne
- 1958 Biel
- 1963 Zurich
- 1969 Thun
- 1985 Chur
- 1990 Winterthur
- 1995 Thun
- 2000 Bière
- 2005 Frauenfeld
- 2010 Aarau
- 2015 Raron

== Disciplines ==
The Swiss Shooting Sport Federation administers several shooting disciplines. Among the most popular are the 300 meter rifle competitions, which also have some of the longest traditions within Swiss shooting. Competitions can be either individual or team events, and each year several sectional and national championships are held. There are also separate events for the youth (Jungschützen) and the elderly (Veteranen).

Fullbore rifle (Gewehr 300)

- ISSF 300 meter standard rifle (Standardgewehr)
- 300 meter army rifle (Armeewaffen)
- Rifle field shooting (Feldschiessen)

Smallbore rifle (Gewehr 10/50)

- ISSF 10 meter air rifle (Luftgewehr)
- ISSF 50 meter rifle prone (Kleinkalibergewehr)

Pistol (Pistole 10/25/50)

- Service pistol (Ordonnanzpistole'), shot at either 25 or 50 m
- ISSF 10 meter air pistol (Luftpistole)
- ISSF 25 meter pistol (Randfeuerpistole)
- ISSF 25 meter center-fire pistol (Zentralfeuerpistole)
- ISSF 25 meter rapid fire pistol
- ISSF 50 meter pistol (Freipistole)

Shooting combined with physical sports

- ISSF Target Sprint

=== Field shooting ===
The annual field shooting organized by SSV is the largest shooting event in the world with around 135,000 participants in decentralized locations, and has been held early in the summer every year for over 130 years.

The development of field shooting in the 20th century was largely related to compulsory shooting training in the Swiss army. The annual target shooting for teams was introduced in 1850, but the shooting results were deemed unsatisfactory with only 15% managing to hit a man sized target at 300 meters, while the remaining 85% missed the target. Based on these results, Twannberg in the canton of Bern arranged a mandatory civilian field shooting competition in 1872. There is evidence that field shooting events have been held regularly in the cantons of Bern and Solothurn since 1879. However, field shooting spread slowly in the beginning, and only gained popularity in a few other cantons until 1899 when SSV established common national competition rules and started to provide financial support.

Field shooting gained much popularity from the turn of the century, and from 1919 pistol field shooting was also included in addition to rifle field shooting, albeit at a much shorter distance. In 1926, all the cantons of Switzerland were represented at the field shooting for the first time. The field shooting has been held annually since 1940.

While firearms long have been closely linked to Swiss traditions, clubs have been struggling to recruit younger members in the last years and experienced a steady fall in the number of participants. In 2018, the number of participants in the field shooting event were 20 000 less compared to ten years earlier. According to Walter Harisberger in the Swiss Shooting Sport Federation, major reasons for the decline are that Swiss soldiers finish their military service earlier and some choose to hand in their firearms earlier, resulting in fewer marksmen, as well as that the shooting sports now are competing with several other recreational activities for the attention of Swiss youth.

== See also ==
- Gun politics in Switzerland
- ProTell
- Swiss Dynamic Shooting Federation, another shooting sport organization based in Switzerland
- The British, Swedish, Norwegian and Danish shooting movements, historical movements modelled after the Swiss shooting movement

=== Other umbrella organizations for shooting ===
- Association of Maltese Arms Collectors and Shooters
- Finnish Shooting Sport Federation
- French Shooting Federation
- Hellenic Shooting Federation
- Monaco Shooting Federation
- Norwegian Shooting Association
- Royal Spanish Olympic Shooting Federation
