= Bullseye shooting =

Shooting sport

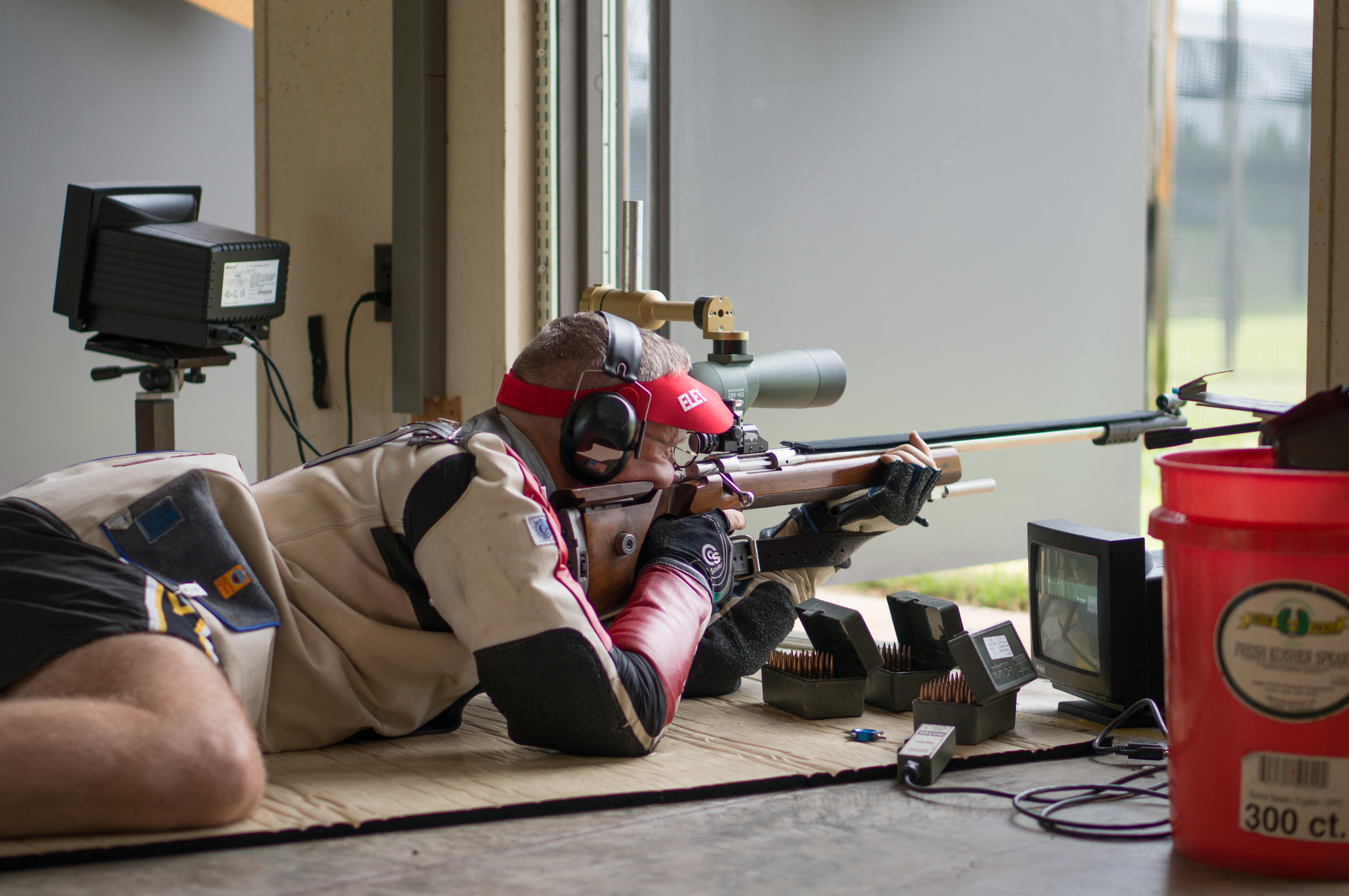
- U.S. Olympic shooter Eric Uptagrafft in prone position at the 2013 USA Shooting 300 m Championship, Fort Benning, Georgia, United States.
- Highest governing body: International Shooting Sport Federation (ISSF)
- Nicknames: Bullseye shooting competition

Characteristics
- Contact: No
- Team members: Yes
- Mixed-sex: Yes or no (depending on competition)
- Type: Shooting sport
- Equipment: Pistol or rifle
- Venue: Shooting range

Presence
- Olympic: Yes
- World Championships: Yes
- Paralympic: Yes

Bullseye shooting is a category of shooting sport disciplines whose objective is to score points with carefully placed precision shots as close as possible to the center of a target, which is typically marked by a dark-colored circle nicknamed the "bull's eye". In Scandinavia, this type of shooting competition is referred to as Range-Shooting (Danish: baneskydning, Norwegian: baneskyting, Swedish: banskytte), as it usually takes place at dedicated shooting range.

A large emphasis is put on accuracy and precision through steady breath, sight picture and trigger control, and fixed and relatively long time limits give competitors time to concentrate for a perfect shot. An example of bullseye shooting competitions is the ISSF pistol and rifle events, but there are also many other national and international disciplines which can be classified as bullseye shooting, e.g., NRA Precision Pistol competitions in the United States.

Matches are normally held at permanent shooting ranges where the competitors are lined up beside each other and shoot during the same predetermined time period at their own stationary targets which are placed at the same fixed distances from match to match. Distances in bullseye shooting disciplines are typically given in round numbers such as 10, 15, 25, 50, 100, 200, or 300 meters, depending on firearm type and discipline. During competition, the line consisting of shooters is called the firing line, while the line consisting of targets is called the target line. Due to its simple format, bullseye shooting is often recommended for beginners in shooting sports in order to learn the general fundamentals of marksmanship. Bullseye shooting is a part of the olympics, and considerable training is needed to achieve a high level of proficiency.

== Examples of bullseye disciplines ==
=== Rifle disciplines ===
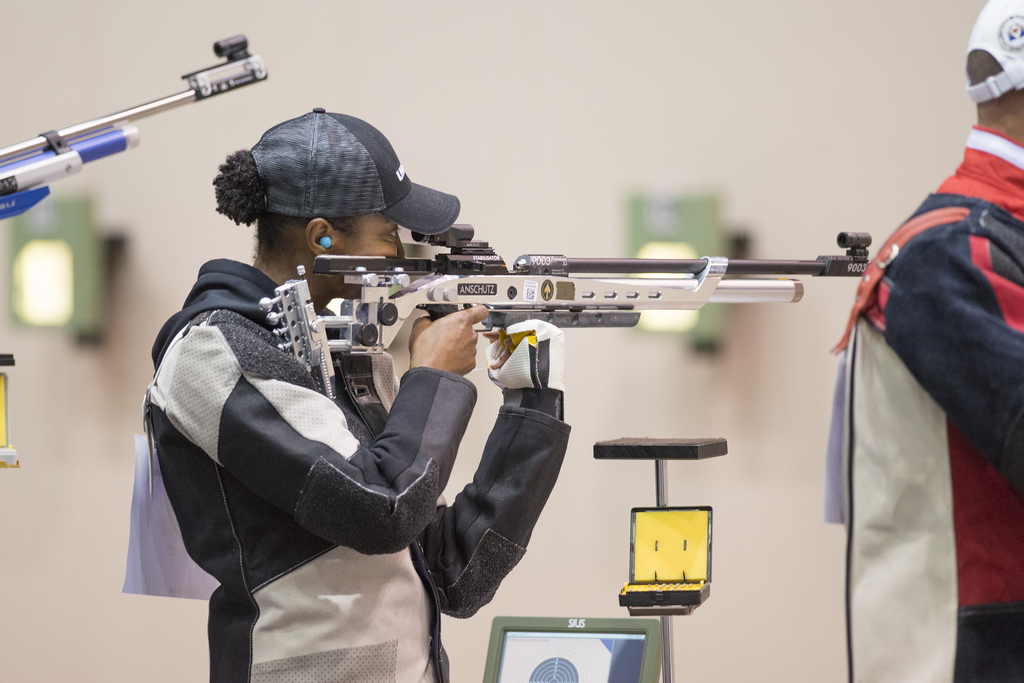
Woman shooting 10 Metre Air Rifle

The 10-ring bullseye target used for the ISSF 300 meter rifle disciplines.

Bullseye shooting with rifles can refer to several disciplines:

- ISSF 10 meter air rifle is an air rifle discipline shot with 4.5 mm (0.177 in) caliber air rifles.
- Small-bore shooting competitions are a set of several disciplines usually shot at distances of 10, 15 or 50 meters, usually only for small-bore rifles in .22 LR caliber.
  - ISSF 50 meter rifle prone
  - ISSF 50 meter rifle three positions
  - National Norwegian Small-Bore competitions (miniatyrgevær or innendørsskyting) are shot at 15 meters by both the Norwegian Shooting Association and the National Rifle Association of Norway, but at different target sizes.
- Fullbore rifle shooting usually refers to disciplines where one uses intermediate (such as .223 Remington or 6mm BR) or battle rifle cartridges (such as the .308 Winchester or the .30-06 Springfield) which comparably are larger and more powerful cartridges than the small-bore .22 LR cartridge.
  - ISSF 300 meter standard rifle
  - ISSF 300 meter rifle prone
  - ISSF 300 meter rifle three positions
  - ICFRA Palma and F-Class, and various national fullbore target rifle disciplines in Commonwealth nations.
  - High power rifle, a fullbore rifle discipline arranged in the United States by the National Rifle Association of America.
  - Nordic Bullseye Rifle-Shooting (Danish: baneskydning, Norwegian: baneskyting, Swedish: banskytte) is fired at 100, 200, or 300 meters depending on class, and either with the small-bore .22 LR cartridge at 100 meters, or fullbore calibers at distances 100, 200, or 300 meters. Matches are usually held in the summer season, and are arranged by the National Rifle Association of Norway (DFS), the Danish Gymnastics and Sports Associations (DGI Shooting) and the Swedish Shooting Sport Association (SvSF).

=== Handgun disciplines ===
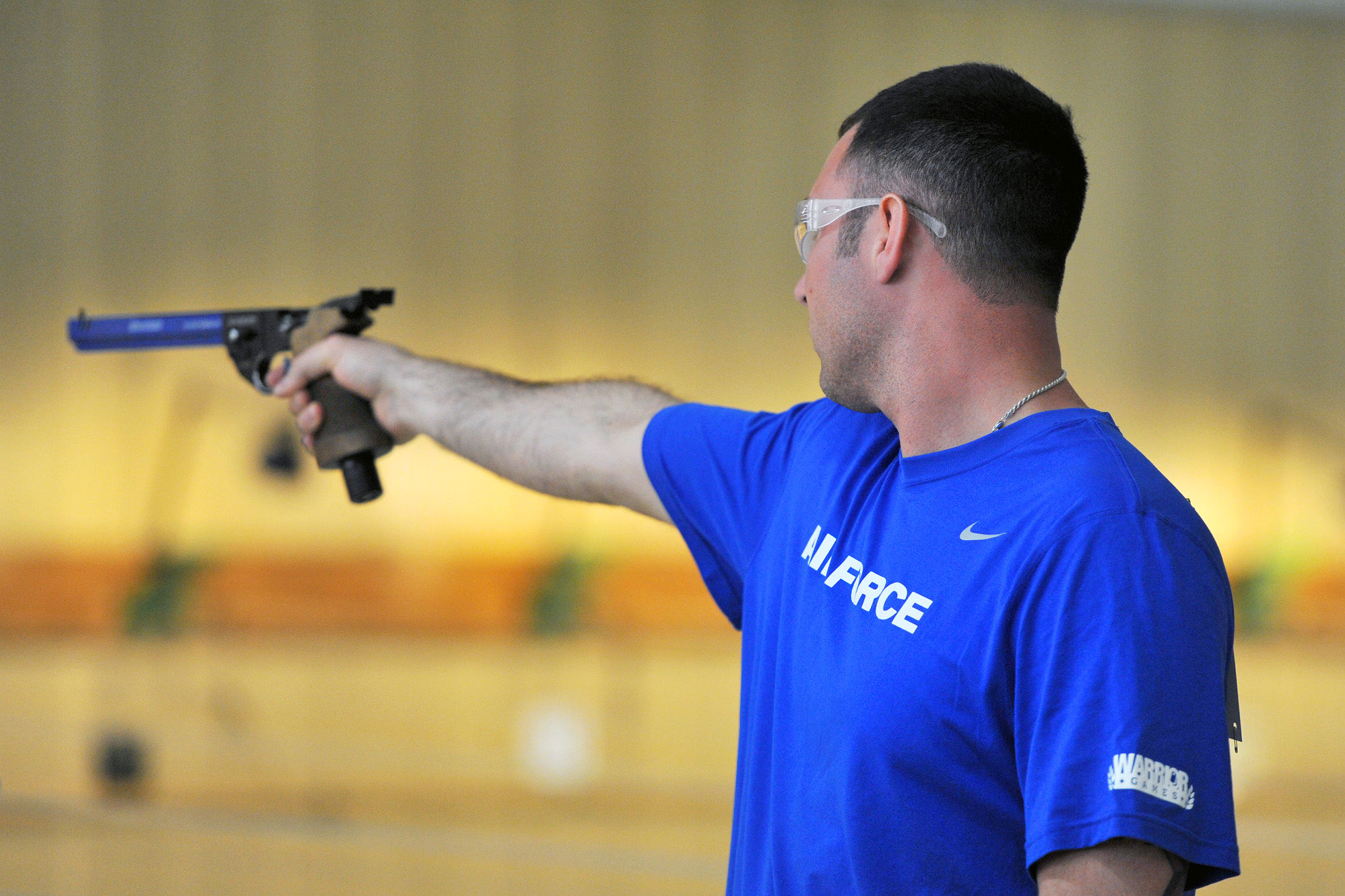
Indoor Bullseye shooting with an air pistol.

Bullseye shooting with handguns can refer to several disciplines:

- Airgun:
  - ISSF 10 meter air pistol is an air pistol discipline shot with 4.5 mm (0.177 in) caliber air pistols.
- Small-caliber (.22 LR):
  - ISSF 25 meter pistol
  - ISSF 25 meter standard pistol
  - ISSF 25 meter rapid fire pistol
  - ISSF 50 meter pistol
  - NRA Precision Pistol
- Large-caliber:
  - ISSF 25 meter center-fire pistol allows many centerfire cartridges, but the most popular one is the .32 S&W Long.
  - NRA Precision Pistol centerfire matches require pistols of caliber 32-45. Typical cartridges include .32 S&W Long, .32 ACP, .38 Special, 9×19mm Parabellum, and .45 ACP.

== Comparing to other shooting disciplines ==
While many shooting sport disciplines share the same fundamental characteristics, bullseye competitions can be set apart from other disciplines in many ways.

- In Clay pigeon shooting target scoring is not graduated by rings or "scoring areas", but rather scored either a hit or miss.
- Long range shooting competitions puts a larger emphasis on knowledge and application of ballistics in different weather conditions, mostly to compensate for wind drift on longer ranges. Rifle shooting disciplines with distances beyond 300 meters are often distinctively referred to as long range shooting, even though some of these disciplines also fulfill all the characteristics of the bullseye shooting disciplines which however are shot at shorter distances. Among long range disciplines are the ICFRA Palma and F-Class competitions, where competitors shoot from the same line, at fixed target ranges between 300 and 900 meters (or 300 to 1,000 yards) during the same predetermined time period. However, disciplines referred to as long range shooting differ from those simply referred to as bullseye in that external ballistics is of much larger importance.
- Speed shooting competitions, which puts a large emphasis on time since a course must be shot with the most points in the shortest amount of time.
- Field-shooting or terrain-shooting (Danish: terrænskydning, Norwegian: feltskyting, Swedish: fältskytte) differ in that they usually are shot from temporary shooting ranges in the terrain at varying distances, rather than permanent shooting ranges at fixed distances.
- Other disciplines differ for instance in that targets are moving (such as in running target shooting), or that the competitors shoots one and one at a time (such as in clay pigeon shooting and practical shooting sports).

== See also ==
- Action shooting
- Bullseye (shooting competition)
- Field shooting
- ISSF World Shooting Championships
- Plinking
- List of shooting sports organizations
- Shooting sport
