= Colt Python =

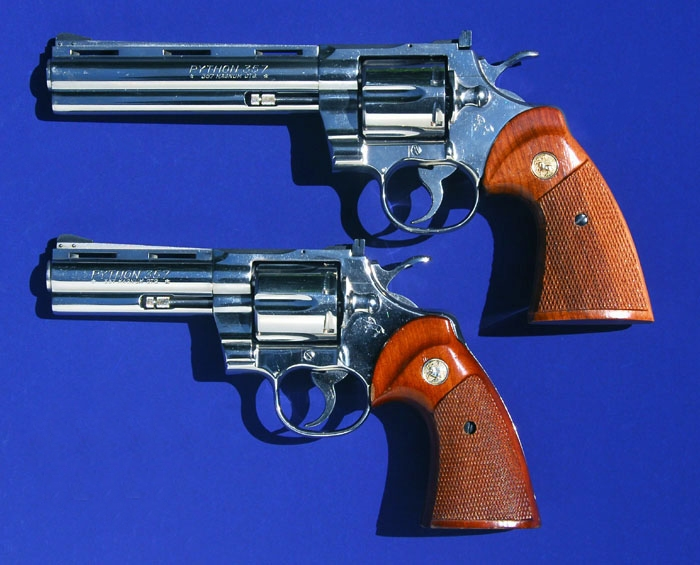
- Colt Pythons with 6-inch (15 cm) and 4-inch (10 cm) barrels and nickel finish
- Type: Revolver
- Place of origin: United States

Production history
- Manufacturer: Colt's Manufacturing Company
- Produced: 1955–2005 (Generation 1); 2020–present (Generation 2)
- Variants: 2.5-inch (6.4 cm), 3-inch (7.6 cm), 4-inch (10 cm), 4.25-inch (10.8 cm), 6-inch (15 cm) and 8-inch (20 cm) barrel

Specifications
- Mass: 38 ounces (1.1 kg) to 48 ounces (1.4 kg)
- Cartridge: .357 Magnum
- Action: Double action and single action
- Maximum firing range: 200 yd (180 m)
- Feed system: Six-round cylinder
- Sights: Rear adj.; front ramp

The Colt Python is a double action/single action revolver chambered for the .357 Magnum cartridge. It was first introduced in 1955 by the Colt's Manufacturing Company.

Pythons have a reputation for accuracy, smooth trigger pull, and a tight cylinder lock-up. Pythons, built on Colt's large I-frame, are similar in size and function to the Colt Trooper and Colt Lawman revolvers.

== History ==
=== Development and design ===
The Colt Python did not have an intensive development program, it was essentially gunsmiths on the production floor trying to come up with a match revolver using mostly existing pieces and parts, and what they created was one of the "finest-looking handguns ever made" according to Keefe.

Al De John, who started with Colt in 1946 as a gunsmith, worked with factory superintendent Al Gunther. De John started to tinker with the .38 Special Officer's Model Match beefing up the cylinder, frame, and top-strap due to problems with blowback and firing pins from the excessive pressure from the .357 Magnum hammering the recoil plate. The recoil plate, a separate piece set into the frame, was eliminated by putting the firing-pin hole directly into the frame and making the top strap and crane more robust. Al Gunther first suggested having the iconic vent rib across the barrel. The Python snake name for the revolver came from Colt sticking to their reptilian revolver naming, following the 1950 .38 Special "Cobra". Thus the "Python" was the second snake moniker for Colt's lineup. The Colt Python was first introduced in 1955 as Colt's top-of-the-line model and was originally intended to be a large-frame .38 Special target revolver. As a result, it features precision adjustable sights, a smooth trigger, solid construction, and extra metal. Pythons have a distinct appearance due to a full barrel underlug, ventilated rib and adjustable sights. Colt revolver cylinders rotate clockwise compared to counter-clockwise of other revolvers (like Smith & Wesson or Ruger). When the revolver is at full cock, just as the trigger is pressed, the cylinder locks up for the duration of the hammer strike. As the trigger is pressed, the cylinder moves into lockup by the hand, and it is locked tightly. The Colt is locked up tight when the hammer falls. Colt claims that since the cylinder rotates to the right, this forces the cylinder into the frame, opposite of the Smith & Wesson. The gap between the cylinder and forcing cone is very tight, further aiding accuracy and velocity.

=== Production of Generation 1 (1955–2005) ===
Colt originally manufactured Pythons with hollow underlugs but left them solid to work as a stabilizing barrel weight. It was initially released with a 6" barrel, then a 4" barrel, and finally a 2.5" barrel which was the shortest barrel that could accommodate the vent on the rib. The Python was the first time Colt used the Royal Blue finish, coming from a very high polish on the gun and then bluing. Initially, only Colt gunsmiths Al De John and Don Bedford were allowed to work on the Pythons. This gunsmithing included intricate hand fitting and polishing and each revolver would take Colt gunsmiths a little longer; about 20 minutes of labor, compared to the 15 minutes (4 guns per hour) of other Colt revolvers. The Python was initially priced at $125, the same as the reintroduced Single Action Army. Only one Python was built in 1955, a little over 300 Pythons were built by the end of 1956, and more than 100,000 Pythons were built by 1969. From the 1970s each Python revolver was boresighted at the factory with a laser; the first mass-produced revolver for which this was done.

=== End of Generation 1 (2005) ===
In October 1999, Colt announced that it would cease production of Python revolvers. In a 2000 follow-up letter to distributors, the company cited changing market conditions and the costs of defending lawsuits as the reasons to discontinue the Python line, as well as a number of other models. The Colt Custom Gun Shop continued making a limited number of Pythons on special order until 2005, when this limited production ceased. First generation Colt Pythons had a higher cost due to the "hand fitting" by gunsmith specialists that were required due the variations that came from that era's limited capabilities with regards to the mass production and machining of precision steel parts. This required expensive gunsmith specialists to file and hand fit parts together, contributing to high labor costs. The 2020 reintroduction of the Colt Python was partially made possible with the increased precision of machining and improvements of tolerances and strength of metal injection molding, negating the need for "hand fitting" by expensive specialists.

=== Generation 2 (2020–present) ===
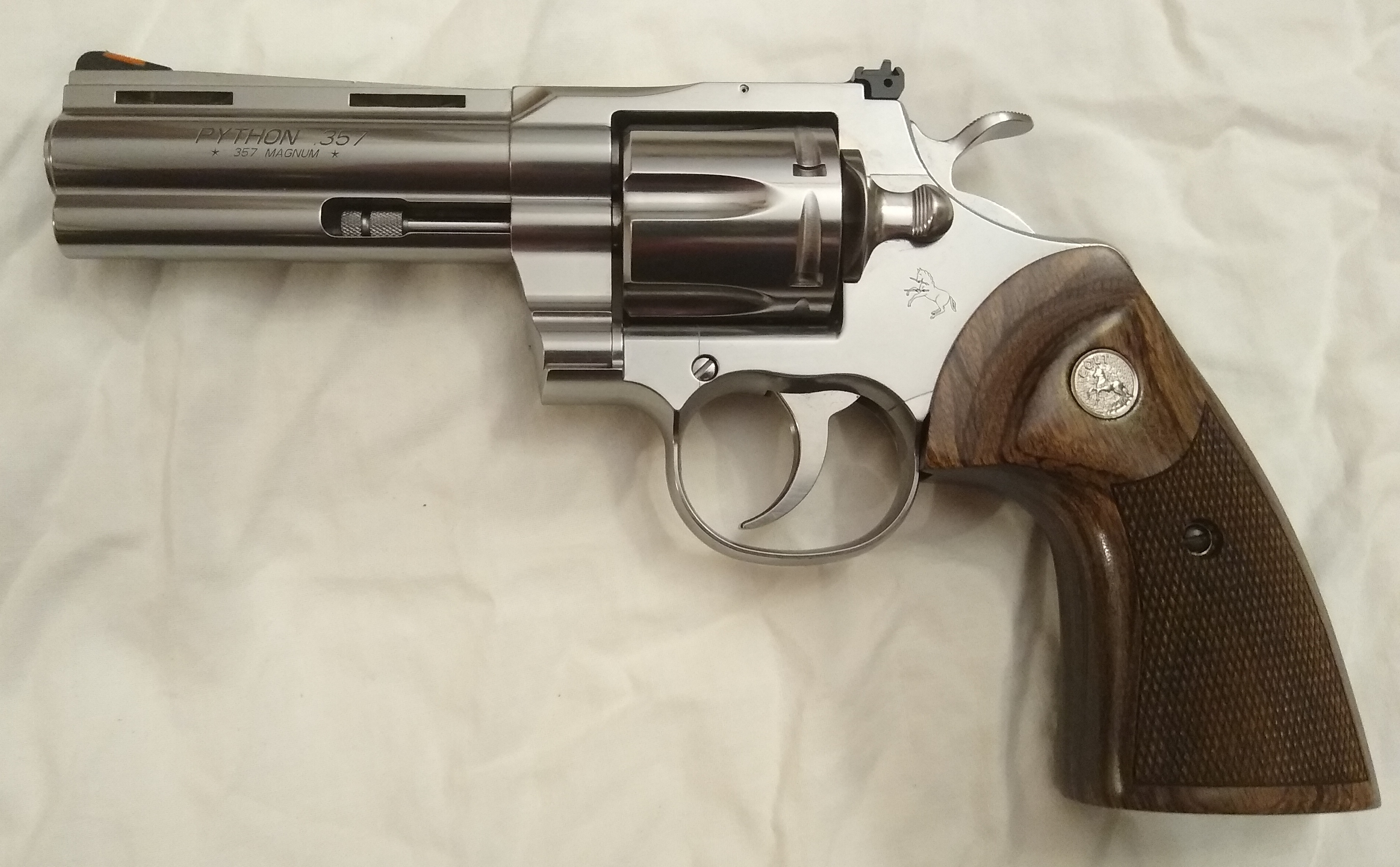
Colt Python, 2020 production

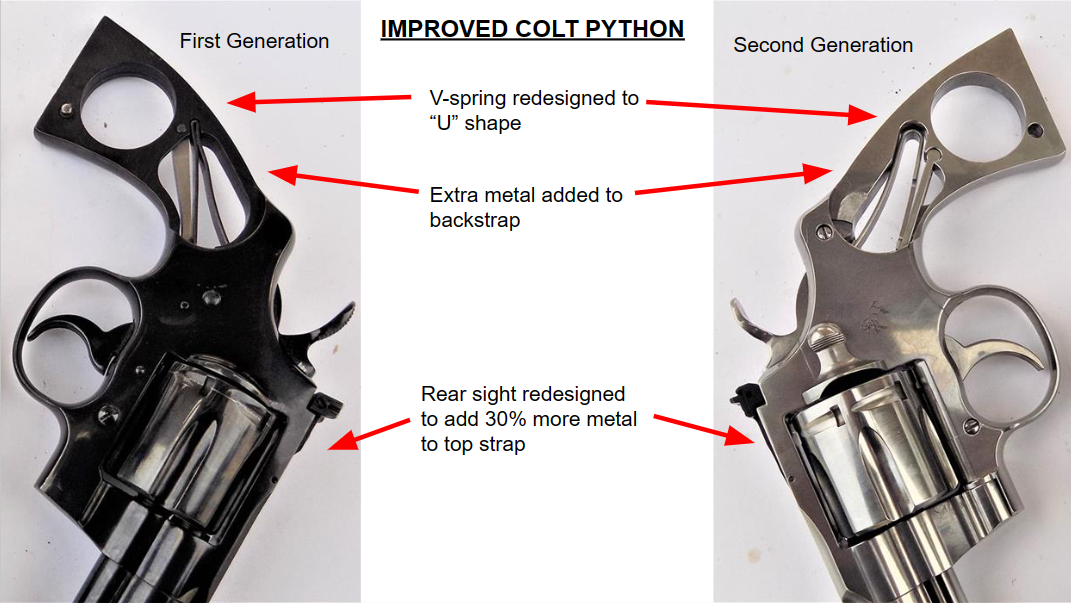
Improvements to Colt Python

The second generation Colt Python was officially released by Colt in January 2020. The new second generation Pythons were strengthened and made to be more robust by being built out of stronger stainless steel than the first generation, increasing the steel mass of the backstrap, and thirty percent more steel beneath the rear adjustable sight. When Colts were first introduced, they were initially designed to shoot bullseye matches, and during the 1950s and 60's most shooters were using light .38 Specials for their matches. But as the Pythons became more widely adopted with law enforcement and shooters who ran their guns with higher powered .357 Magnum rounds, Pythons gained a reputation for being fragile when subjected to hard use with magnum loads. So for the second generation Colts, engineers redesigned the rear sight which allowed them to add 30 percent more steel above the cylinder in the top strap. Furthermore, the steel used in the second generation benefits of stronger modern metallurgy. The 410-series stainless steel Colt has used in Pythons since 1983 has been replaced with a stronger more corrosion resistant alloy. It is available with a 3 in (7.6 cm), 4.25 in (10.8 cm) or 6 in (15 cm) barrel. The Colt Python is powered by a V-spring versus the Smith & Wesson’s leaf spring. Since the 2020-update, the V-spring has been redesigned into a "U" shape, in addition to simplifying and subtracting parts from the lockwork, to prevent "stacking", a phenomenon where the weight of pull sharply increases at the end of the trigger's travel. All new production Pythons are shipped with Altamont wood grips.

== Usage ==
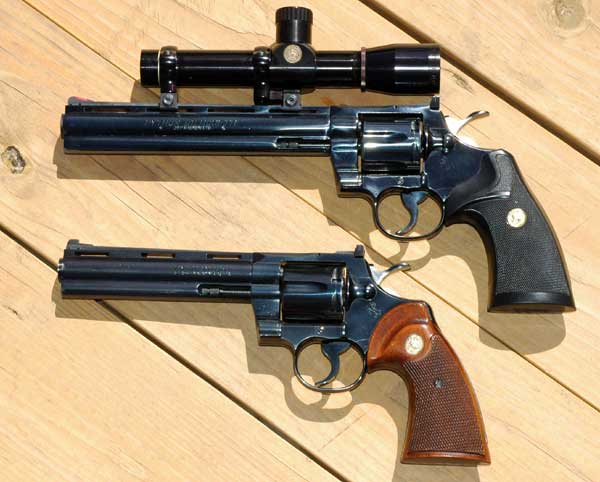
Colt Pythons with 8-inch and 6-inch barrels and royal blue finish

The Python has been extremely popular with both target shooters and law enforcement.

=== Law enforcement ===
The Python immediately made inroads into the law enforcement market when introduced, with the 6-inch barrel being popular with uniformed officers and the 4-inch barrel considered optimal for plainclothes use. The Colorado State Patrol issued 4-inch blue Pythons until their switch to the S&W .40 caliber autoloader. Georgia State Patrol issued Pythons in the 1980s until their transition to Glock semiautomatic pistols in the 1990s. Florida Highway Patrol issued Pythons to their officers in the 1980s until their transition to the Beretta 92FS in the late 1980s. Python has since fallen out of common use, along with all revolvers, due to changing law enforcement needs that favor semi-automatic pistols. When law-enforcement agencies realized that the 9mm semi-automatic pistols fire a round with similar characteristics to the .38 Special with higher capacity, they began a migration to these, and other, semi-automatic pistol cartridges. The move away from the Python is also being driven by the increasing number of law enforcement agencies which require officers to carry department-issue weapons (as a way to reduce liability).

=== Crime ===
A Python, loaded with semiwadcutter bullets, was used to murder Irish crime reporter Veronica Guerin in 1996, an act which resulted in the creation of the Criminal Assets Bureau.

=== Media ===
The Colt Python was prominently featured in AMC's The Walking Dead (2010–2022), carried by protagonist Rick Grimes throughout nine of the series' 11-seasons. The popularity of the show contributed to increased market demand, which played a role in Colt's decision to reintroduce the model in 2020. The Python has also been featured in numerous films, television series, video games, and literature, including The Walking Dead, Resident Evil, Half-Life, Dirty Harry (1971), Magnum Force (1973), City Hunter (1987), Fight Club (1999), American Gangster (2007), Call of Duty: Black Ops (2010), John Wick (2014), and television series such as Starsky and Hutch, The X-Files, Hawaii Five-O, and Burn Notice.

=== Famous ===
According to Colt historian, R. L. Wilson, Colt Pythons have been collected by Elvis Presley and various kings: "H.M. (His Majesty) Hussein I of Jordan ordered a limited number of Pythons with 4-inch and 6-inch barrels, as gifts to friends. Casing and barrel were embossed with His Majesty's crest. The Python for King Juan Carlos of Spain bore his name in flush gold on the sideplate. Among other celebrated recipients: King Khalid and Prince Fahd (Saudi Arabia), King Hassan (Morocco), Sheik Zayed (United Arab Emirates), President Anwar Sadat (Egypt) and President Hafez Assad (Syria)."

== Models and variants ==
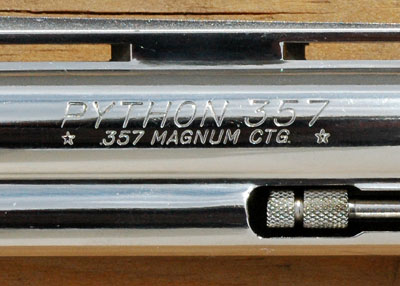
Colt Python rollmark on the barrel

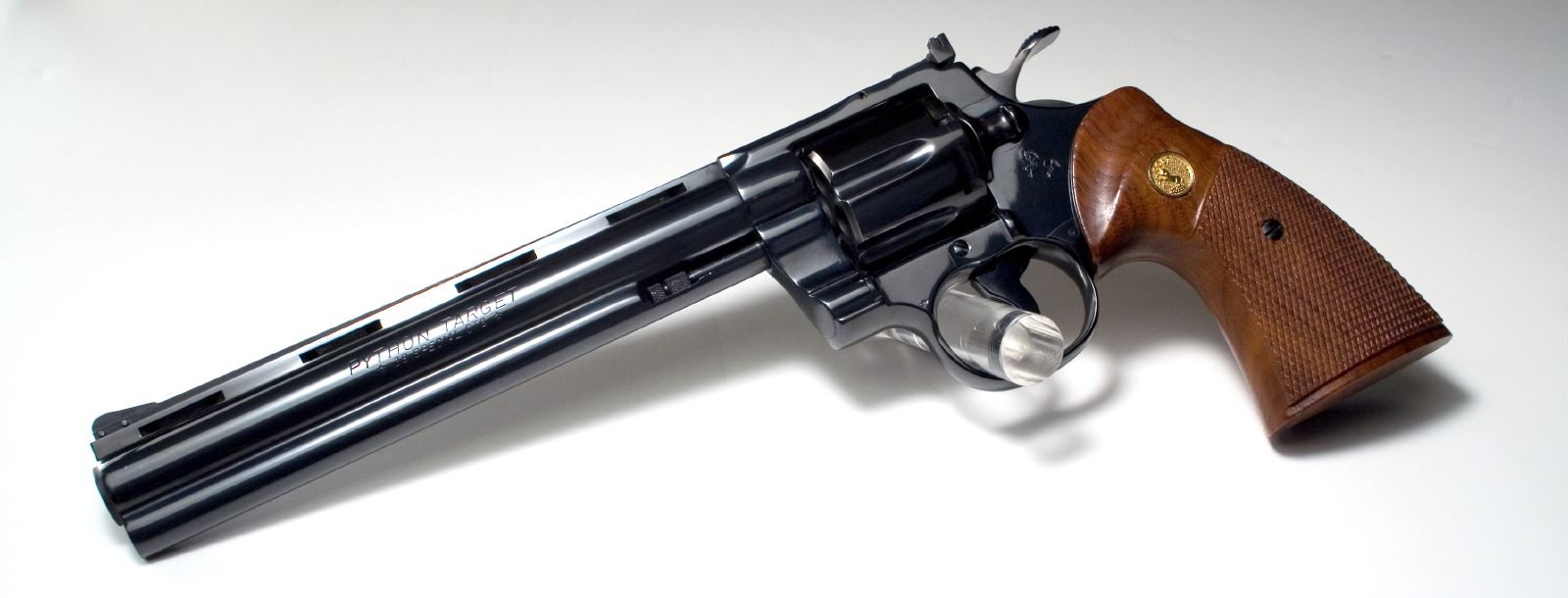
Colt Python Target, 8-inch (20 cm) barrel .38 Special

The Colt Python featured a fully adjustable white-outline Accro rear sight and a 1/8-inch (3 mm) front ramp with red inset. A wide spur, checkered hammer and grooved, curved trigger. Initially only a blued finish was offered, it was the first time Colt produced the Royal Blue finish. Soon after the introduction, a nickel finish was added, and together with Royal Blue, these were the two factory finishes. Initially made only with a 6-inch (15 cm) barrel, a compact 4-inch (10 cm) came afterward. Between 1955 and 1994, a downsized 2.5-inch (6.4 cm) barrel version was introduced which still sported full-sized grips. Colt also produced a few short runs of revolvers with a 3-inch (7.6 cm) barrel known to collectors as "Combat Pythons."

In 1980, an 8-inch (20 cm) barrel Python was introduced chambered for the .38 Special. The Colt Python Target .38 Special was made in Royal Blue and only 251 Colt Python Targets were given the nickel finish. Also the Colt Python Hunter was unveiled, which was the 8-inch Python with Pachmayr grips, factory-mounted 2X Leupold scope on the barrel with Redfield mounts, and packaged in a Haliburton case that included a Colt-marked plastic ammunition box, wood handle cleaning rod and tool kit. The Colt Python Hunter was the first field-ready handgun hunting package made by a major handgun manufacturer. It was discontinued by 1990 and briefly offered as a Colt Custom Shop model afterward.

In 1981, Coltguard, a proprietary electroless weather-resistant plating, was also made available. The stainless Python was reintroduced in 1984, followed in 1985 by the super-polished stainless Ultimate Python, which was fitted with an Elliason target front sight. In 1988 only 200 Colt Python Stalker were produced in stainless steel. It has an 8-inch vented ribbed barrel, a smooth non-fluted cylinder, a Leupold M8-2x Extended E.R. scope, and rubber grips with the Colt Medallion. A small number of Pythons were gold and silver plated for various commemoratives and special orders throughout the years.

In 1982, the Colt Python Silhouette came with a rib-mounted Leupold scope and Pachmayr grips, and housed in a black fitted-case with nickel trim. There was also an 8-inch Ten Pointer Series with a 3X Burris scope, wooden grips, an extra set of neoprene composition grips and a carrying case.

Two Colt revolver variants using Python barrels but not Python frames or internals were made in small numbers by Colt. The first was the Colt Boa of 1985, a limited production run of 1,200 .357 Magnum revolvers, made for the Lew Horton Distributing Company in Massachusetts. It uses a Python barrel mated to a Trooper Mk V frame. Six hundred 6-inch revolvers and six hundred 4-inch revolvers were made, of which one hundred were matched sets. Though it resembles a Python visually, it is substantially different internally.

The second was the stainless steel Colt Grizzly of 1994, another limited-production .357 Magnum revolver. It uses a Python barrel mated to a Colt King Cobra frame. Five hundred of these revolvers were manufactured, with six-inch Magna-ported barrels and smooth, unfluted cylinders. The ported barrel includes a bear footprint. Similar to the Grizzly was the Colt Kodiak, which was a Colt Anaconda with a Magna-ported barrel and an unfluted cylinder. Approximately 2,000 Kodiaks were manufactured. All original Colt Pythons use the original Colt E/I frame type mechanics with a leaf hammer spring design in common with earlier Colt models, including the postwar Colt .357 Magnum model and the pre-war Colt Official Police and Army Special models. As described above, the Boa and Grizzly are structurally part of the Mk.III/Mk.V revolver product lines which use the much later J and V designated frames. These various hybrids are very collectible due to low production quantities, but because they are a completely different revolver action based upon the later coil-mainspring Colt products, they may not be considered Pythons.

In 1997 manufacture of the Python was switched from the main assembly line to the Colt Custom Shop, and the gun was offered in both highly polished and matte stainless steel and renamed the Colt Python Elite. It remained in limited production, off and on, until 2004.

In 2020, Colt reintroduced the Python in 4.25-and-6-inch (10.8 and 15.2 cm) barrels, followed by a 3-inch (7.6 cm) version in 2022. The reintroduced Python has been technically revised and reinforced compared to the original revolver. Of the first issues, the 6-inch is generally the most common, the 8-inch was intended for hunting, the 4-inch was preferred by plain-clothes police, the 2.5-inch and 3-inch were limited and have become rare.

With the production return in January 2020, Colt sanctioned and authenticated the first engraved new production Colt Python. It was made by Tyler Gun Works and sold for $18,026 via auction on GunBroker.com on February 27, 2020. The proceeds were donated to the NRA Whittington Center Adventure Camp.

== Issues ==
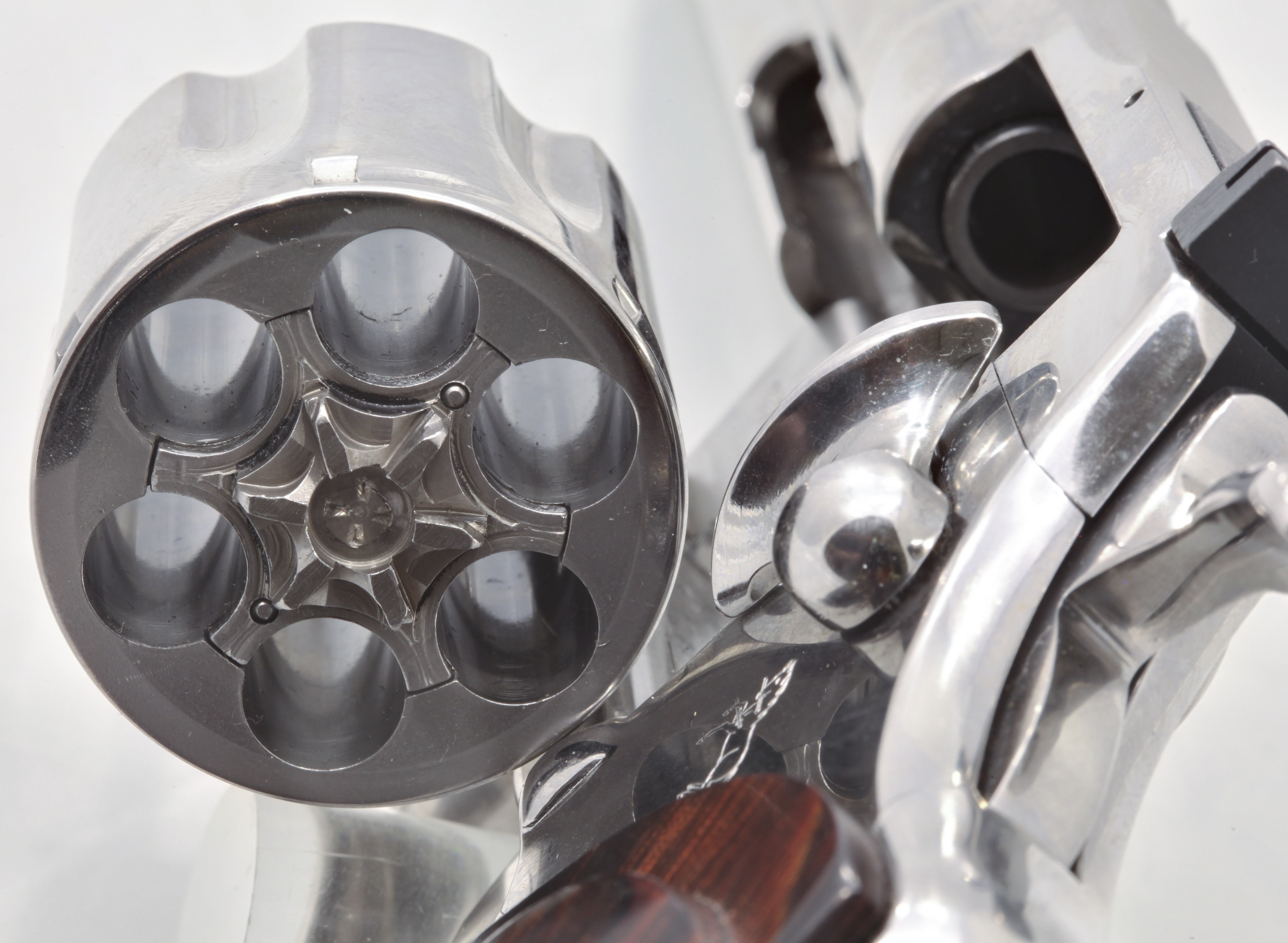
Colt Python with open cylinder

With the re-introduction of the new 2020-era Colt Python, whenever examining issues of a Colt Python it is necessary to first determine whether the inquiry is in regard to the first generation 1955–2005 Python model or the redesigned second generation 2020-era Python with improved internals and upgraded robustness.

A downside to the older generation Colt Python's precision was a tendency to go out of time with continued heavy shooting. Going "out of time" or mis-timing on a revolver is a condition in which the hand does not move each and every cylinder chamber to the exact correct rotation with respect to the forcing cone. Furthermore, any revolver used for many thousands of rounds may eventually require the same timing adjustments. In any case, the first and most common symptom of typical timing issues will be only a slight loss of accuracy, which on a Python may not even be noticeable to many shooters. Colt beefed up the robustness by increasing the quality of the steel, hardness of the parts, and the amount of steel for the 2020 release of the second generation Pythons.

Stacking, a phenomenon where the weight of pull sharply increases at the end of the trigger's travel, was an issue for the first generation Pythons. For the 2020 release of the second generation Pythons, Colt redesigned the lockwork, simplifying and subtracting parts, and redesigning the V-spring into a "U" shape where 'stacking' is no longer an issue.

Author Martin Dougherty notes the weight of the Python as a drawback, as it is quite heavy for a handgun of its caliber, ranging from 2.4 lbs (1.1 kg) to 2.6 lbs (1.2 kg). This makes the Python comparable to Smith & Wesson's premier .357, the M27, which weighs 2.6 lb (1.2 kg) with a 4-inch (10 cm) barrel. Both revolvers are 6 to 9 ounces (170 to 260 g) lighter than Smith and Wesson's more powerful M29 .44 Magnum, which weighs 3.0 lb (1.4 kg) in 6 1/2-inch (17 cm) barrel configuration.

== See also ==
- Colt Diamondback
- Colt Delta Elite
- Table of handgun and rifle cartridges
