= Colt King Cobra =

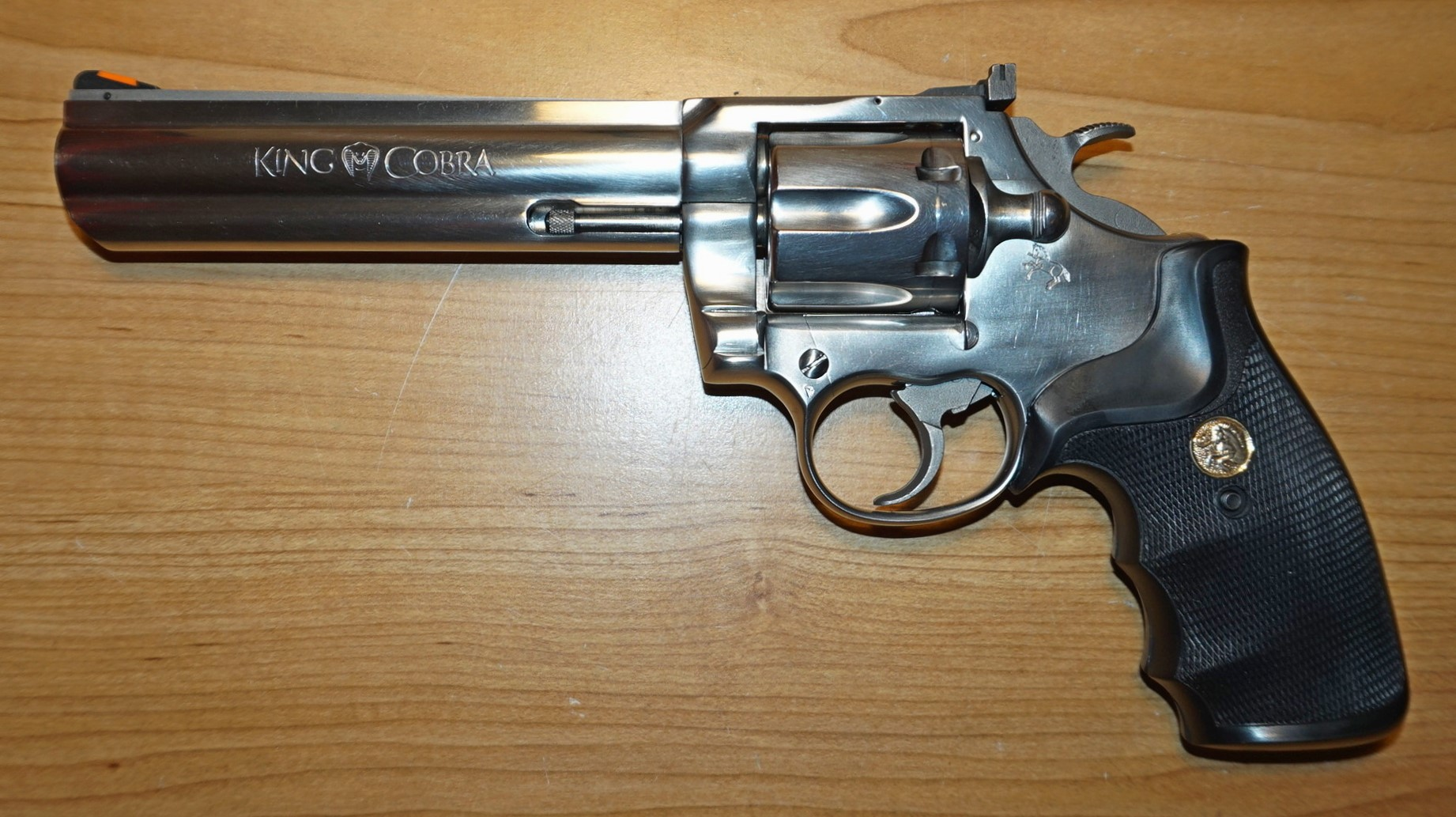
- Type: Revolver
- Place of origin: United States

Production history
- Manufacturer: Colt's Manufacturing Co.
- Produced: 1986–1992; 1994–1998; 2019–present

Specifications
- Barrel length: 2 inch (50.8 mm); 2.5 inch (63.5 mm); 3 inch (76.2 mm); 4 inch (102 mm); 4.25 inch (108 mm); 6 inch (153 mm); 8 inch (203 mm)
- Cartridge: .38 Special; .357 Magnum; .22LR
- Action: Double-action / Single-action
- Feed system: Six round cylinder
- Sights: Iron, adjustable rear

First introduced in 1986, the Colt King Cobra is a medium frame double-action revolver featuring a six round cylinder which was designed and produced by the Colt's Manufacturing Company and marketed to law enforcement agencies and civilian firearms enthusiasts. Available in blued and stainless steel finishes in a variety of barrel lengths and chambered for centerfire .357 Magnum ammunition.

== Development and history ==
Despite its outward similarity to the Colt Python, the King Cobra design is based upon that of an earlier Colt model, the venerable Trooper MK V, improved with the addition of a heavier-duty barrel, full barrel length cylinder ejection rod protection shroud, and a thicker solid rib on top of the barrel. The King Cobra was introduced in 1986, discontinued in 1992, and returned to Colt's product line in 1994. Dropped a second time in 1998, it was not reintroduced until 2019 as a .357 Magnum, three inch barrel variant of the 2017 Colt Cobra.

== Features ==
Built on Colt's medium-size ‘V’ frame from 1986 to 1992, the King Cobra was offered in very hi-grade carbon steel with Colt's signature bright and highly-polished deep royal blued finish. From 1987 to 1992 and 1994-1998 matte stainless steel was offered, and from 1988 to 1992 the option of polished stainless steel became available as well. King Cobras are equipped with either oversized Walnut target-style or hard rubber black finger-grooved combat-style grips, and an enlarged target hammer. The Cobra's sighting system consists of a fixed iron red insert front sight and a fully adjustable iron white outline rear. Various barrel lengths were offered over time according to the finish option chosen.

In blued steel models, 4- and 6-inch barrels were available from 1986 until the blued guns were dropped from production in 1992, also a 2.5-inch length was offered with the blued finish from 1990 to 1992. In matte stainless, a 2.5-inch length was cataloged from 1987 to 1992, 2-inch barrels were offered from 1988 until King Cobra production ceased in 1992 and then again from 1994 to 1998. Barrel lengths of 4, 6, and 8 inches also were available on models with the matte stainless finish from 1990 to 1992; they returned to the product lineup from 1994 to 1998. In the mirror bright stainless finish, 4- and 6-inch lengths were offered from 1988 to 1992, a 2.5-inch was available from 1990 to 1992, and an 8-inch length was offered from 1989 to 1992. The King Cobra is chambered for the powerful .357 Magnum cartridge, but like all .357 revolvers will also fire .38 Special ammunition.

In 1998 the top strap was drilled and tapped for the mounting of scope rings.

Colt also produced a total of six King Cobras with three-inch barrels and fixed sights. These were made for the Montreal Police Department, which had expressed an interest in such a model for plain-clothes officers. The revolver was never adopted and the six samples were returned to the distributor.

In 2019, the King Cobra was reintroduced with a three-inch barrel. The gun debuted at SHOT Show 2019.

Like all .357 Magnum revolvers, the Colt King Cobra can chamber and fire the shorter .38 Special cartridge.

In 2022, The King Cobra line added a 22LR version, 10 shot revolver with either a 4.25 or 6.0 inch barrel.
