= Colt Diamondback =

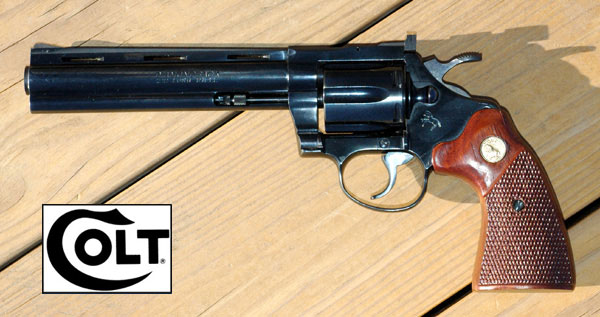
- .22 caliber Colt Diamondback revolver with 6" barrel
- Type: Revolver
- Place of origin: United States

Production history
- Manufacturer: Colt's Manufacturing Company
- Produced: 1966–1988

Specifications
- Mass: (.38) 2½": 26oz; 4": 28.5oz.; 6": 30.5oz.; (.22) 2½": 28.5oz.; 4": 31oz.; 6": 33oz..
- Length: 2½", 4" or 6" bbl.
- Cartridge: .22 LR.38 Special
- Action: Double-action
- Feed system: Six-round cylinder
- Sights: Rear adj.; front ramp

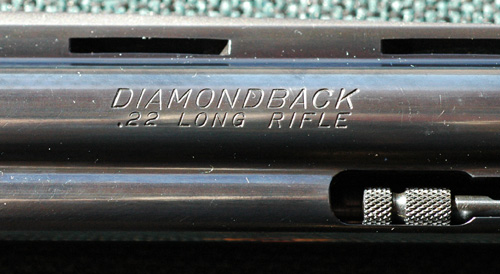
.22 caliber Colt Diamondback rollmark

The Colt Diamondback is a revolver manufactured by Colt's Manufacturing Company of Hartford, Connecticut, in calibers of .22 LR and .38 Special. Inspired by the successful Colt Python, the Diamondback was manufactured from 1966 to 1988 and was available in barrel lengths of 2½, 4, and 6 inches.

== Description ==
Colt introduced the double-action Diamondback as a deluxe model in 1966. It has a wide serrated target hammer, ventilated rib, fully adjustable target quality sights, and full-length barrel underlug. It is a 6-shot revolver with a swing-out cylinder and was available in blue or nickel finishes. Visually, the Diamondback resembles a scaled-down version of the Python, though the action was not tuned as finely as the Python, nor did it receive the Python's Royal Blue finish. While the Python is built on Colt's "I frame," the Diamondback is built on the smaller "D frame," as used in the Detective Special. The Diamondback was dropped from production in 1988.

Because of the light recoil of .22 caliber ammunition, the .22 version of the Diamondback can be used as a training gun for novice shooters. It had gained popularity with gun enthusiasts due to the inexpensive price of .22 caliber ammunition and since it has been discontinued, for its rarity. Saddam Hussein collected the Colt Diamondback among other guns.

In addition, the Diamondback was marketed to law enforcement agencies who did not allow the use of the .357 Magnum cartridge.

== In Media ==
- Steve McQueen used a 2.5" .38 Colt Diamondback in the 1968 movie Bullitt.
- Tamara Dobson used a 4" Colt Diamondback in the 1973 movie Cleopatra Jones.
- John Wayne used a 4" Colt Diamondback in the 1975 movie Brannigan.
- Tyne Daly used a 2.5" Colt Diamondback in the 1976 movie The Enforcer.
