= NRA Precision Pistol =

Bullseye shooting discipline

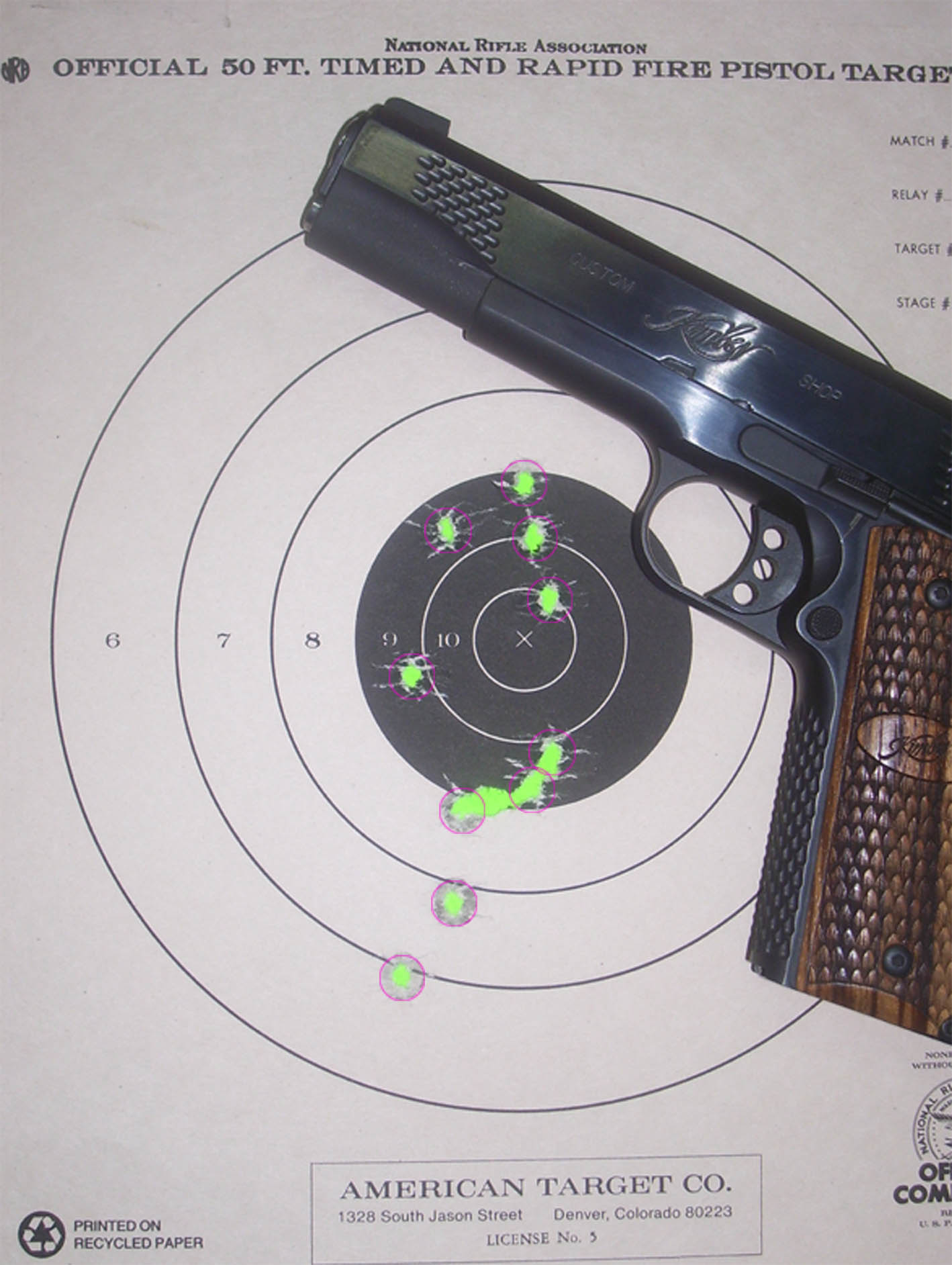
Kimber Raptor with a paper target, 91-1X score

NRA Precision Pistol, formerly known as NRA Conventional Pistol, is a national bullseye shooting discipline organized in the United States by the National Rifle Association of America. Emphasis is on accuracy and precision, and participants shoot handguns at paper targets at fixed distances and time limits. Other organizations in the United States and Canada have established rules and keep records of similar disciplines, including the Civilian Marksmanship Program (CMP) in the United States.

Bullseye pistol was the inspiration for the ISSF international 25 m Standard Pistol (82 feet) event and like the ISSF pistol events, the development of skills required to shoot one-handed at 5.5-inch (14 cm) and 8-inch (20 cm) bullseye targets at 25 and 50 yards (23 and 46 m), respectively, takes considerable training to achieve proficiency.

== Courses of fire ==
All courses of fire are from a standing position using a one-handed grip at two different targets depending on the distance and type of match. The slow-fire targets have the 8–10 rings inside the bullseye and the rapid fire targets have only the 9, 10 and X rings inside the black.

Depending on the match format, the competitor may be required to shoot as many as 90 rounds using as many as three different handguns. Each shot scores a maximum of 10 points. Hence, a one-gun competition is often referred to as a "900" whereas a three-gun competition is a "2700". A shorter form is the National Match Course consisting of a single Slow Fire, a Timed and a Rapid Fire target, 30 shots for a maximum score of 300. Single gun competitions using only the rimfire pistol are common, as they provide an inexpensive entry into the sport.

Outdoor competitions are typically fired at 50 yards (46 m) for slow fire courses and 25 yards (23 m) for timed and rapid fire courses. A "short course" shoots only at 25 yards and uses a reduced-size target for the Slow Fire segment. All courses of fire at an indoor competition are typically fired at 50 feet (15 m) with appropriately scaled targets.

An example outdoor 900 match would include:

- 2 strings of slow fire. Each string consists of 10 shots at 50 yards at a NRA B6 target. The bullseye diameter is 8 inches (20 cm)
- 1 National Match Course consisting of one 10-shot slow fire string at 50 yards, two 5-shot strings of timed fire at 25 yards, and two 5-shot strings of rapid fire at 25 yards.
- 4 strings of timed fire. Each string consists of 5 shots in 20 seconds at 25 yards at a NRA B8 target. The bullseye diameter is 5.5 inches (14 cm).
- 4 strings of rapid fire. Each string consists of 5 shots in 10 seconds at 25 yards at a NRA B8 target. The bullseye diameter is 5.5 inches.

== Equipment rules ==
Bullseye specifies three classes of pistol; a .22 caliber rimfire, a centerfire handgun of .32 caliber or greater; and a .45 caliber pistol. Since the format includes a sustained fire stage, a semi-automatic pistol or revolver with a capacity of at least 5 rounds is needed.

=== Handgun types ===
While most moderately priced rimfire pistols are suitable for bullseye competition (the Ruger MK II or Ruger MK III being a common starting gun) the Smith & Wesson Model 41, High Standard Supermatic Series, 1911 22LR conversions, and the Hämmerli 208 dominate the top levels of rimfire competition.

The most common centerfire pistol is the M1911 design, usually built and accurized by a gunsmith. While many shooters use the M1911 for the centerfire stages of competition, some shooters prefer a third gun. European models such as .32 S&W automatics from Walther, the now discontinued Smith & Wesson Model 52, and others are common, as are M1911 variants in smaller calibers, such as .32 ACP, .380 ACP, .38 Special, 9mm Parabellum, or .38 Super. One advantage of .45 caliber over .38 caliber is that the larger diameter hole made will be able cut a higher scoring ring over the smaller caliber given the same point of impact near the higher ring.

Smith & Wesson revolvers are most common among shooters who prefer revolvers; S&W makes or has made revolvers intended for this competition, specifically the K-22 Masterpiece in .22 Long Rifle, the K-32 Masterpiece (later designated Model 16) in .32 Smith & Wesson Long, the K-38 Masterpeice in .38 Special, the Model 1950 Target (later Model 26) in .45 ACP, and finally the Model 1955 Target (later designated Model 25) in .45 ACP. Custom gunsmithing is common here as well to increase reliability and usability all leading to improved accuracy.

=== Sights ===
Any type of sight can be used, except laser sights. Many competitors use iron sights, but the recent trend has been towards red dot sights, which many shooters find easier to use. Telescopic sights, while legal, are rare, as magnification is not considered an advantage. Iron sights are usually adjustable Patridge type sights, carefully treated to reduce glare that might impact sight alignment.

=== Ammunition ===
For the rimfire pistol, shooters use high quality target grade ammunition, ideally purchased in bulk so all ammunition comes from the same manufacturing lot, since even minor changes can result in changing point of impact. Relatively low velocity ammunition (always below the speed of sound) is preferred for precision Bullseye target shooting in both the slow and sustained fire disciplines because the .22 bullet can travel at or near the speed of sound. If a bullet transitions between supersonic speed and subsonic speed before striking the target, its flight path is slightly disturbed, reducing precision. To avoid this phenomenon, strictly subsonic ammunition is preferred.

Centerfire ammunition is often handloaded, with very careful selection of components so maximum precision can be obtained. Lighter weight bullets and lower velocities are often selected to minimize recoil and improve precision. For any given handgun or rifle there is an optimum combination that delivers the peak or maximum possible accuracy.

== Matches ==
The annual National Rifle and Pistol Matches take place at Camp Perry, Ohio in July and August. Competing shooters are registered with the National Rifle Association and scores are officially recorded. Registered matches (Regional, Sectional, and State championships and local matches) are held at various locations throughout the year and are often sponsored by local shooting clubs. Authorized matches are also recognized by the NRA. Scores at all of these competitions are recorded by the NRA and used to rank a shooter's abilities.

== Records ==
While perfect scores have been shot in individual stages, no shooter has ever scored a 2700 in a sanctioned match. The current record is 2680-159x, set on July 24, 1974, by Hershel Anderson, with 159 of 270 shots hitting the "X" ring.

Former US Marine Brian Zins holds the record of most NRA championships with 12, as of 2013.

== See also ==
- Shooting sports
- Range-Shooting
