= Danish Gymnastics and Sports Associations =

Danish sports organization

DGI (DGI, literally Danish Gymnastics and Sports Associations) is a Danish association of sports clubs which includes 6,400 local sports clubs and 1.6 million athletes. DGI was formed in November 1992 as a merger of De Danske Gymnastik- og Ungdomsforeninger (DDGU), and De Danske Skytte-, Gymnastik- og Idrætsforeninger (DDSG & I). Having had an association agreement for several years, De Danske Skytteforeninger (DDS) was also merged with DGI in January 2013.

DGI has traditionally had a much greater focus on recreational sports, in comparison to the National Olympic Committee and Sports Confederation of Denmark, having artistic gymnastics as their main business. Gradually, however, other sports such as badminton, football, handball and swimming also have grown into a sizable share.
