= Smith & Wesson Model 5906 =

S&W Model 5906
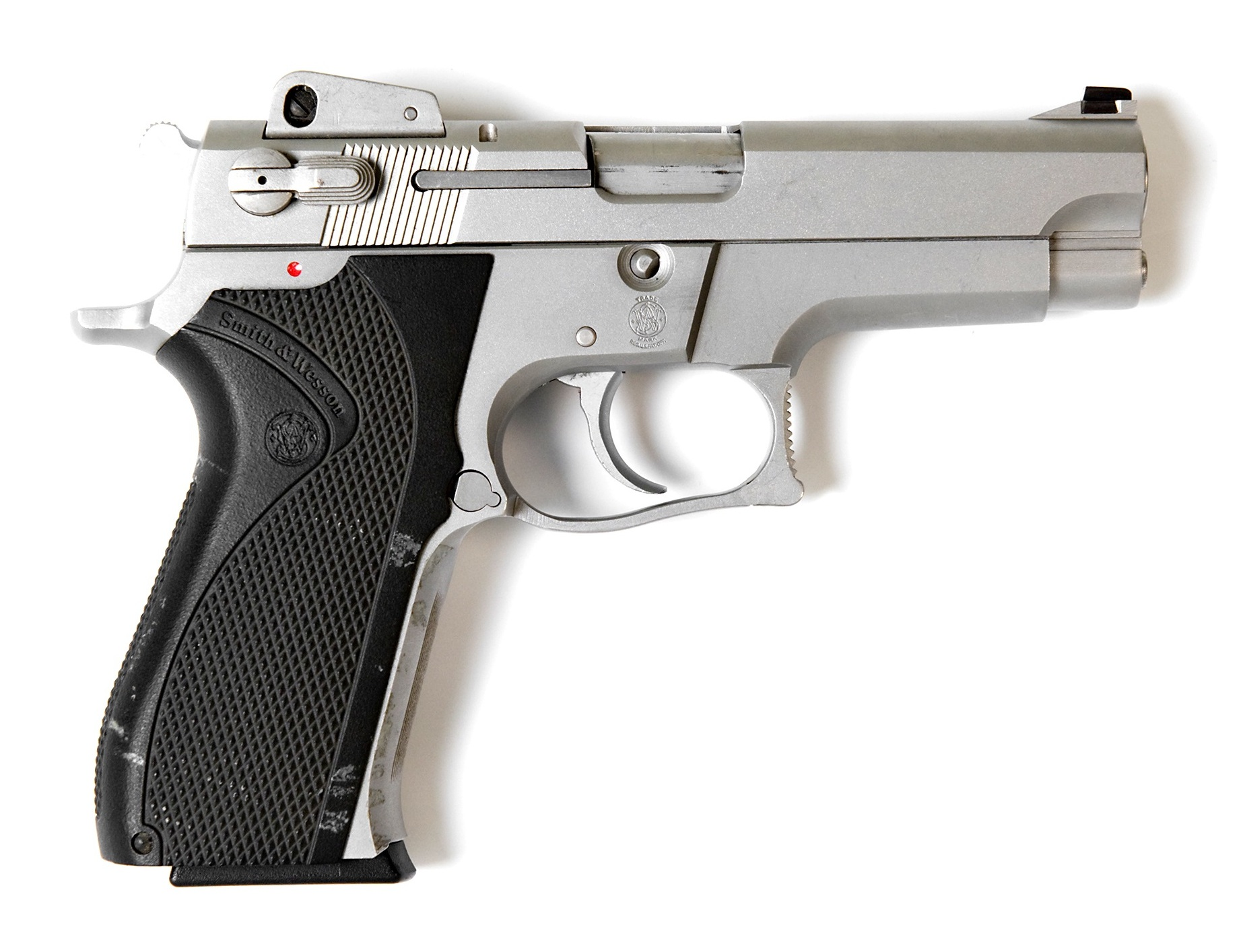
- Type: Semi-automatic pistol
- Place of origin: United States

Service history
- In service: 1990–present

Production history
- Manufacturer: Smith & Wesson
- Produced: 1989–1999

Specifications
- Mass: 1070 g (38.3 oz)
- Length: 191 mm (7.5 in)
- Barrel length: 102 mm (4 in)
- Cartridge: 9×19mm Parabellum
- Action: Double/single action
- Feed system: 10- and 15- round magazine
- Sights: 3-dot adjustable

The Smith & Wesson 5906 is a pistol manufactured starting in 1988 by Smith & Wesson.

== Design ==
The 5906 is a full-sized, double/single-action (DA/SA), staggered-column magazine, 9×19mm pistol. Its construction is all stainless steel. The 5906 is equipped with a magazine disconnect feature which is designed to deactivate the trigger if the magazine is not fully inserted. The pistol comes standard with either a 10- or 15-round magazine. Other features include ambidextrous safety levers, a one-piece rear wraparound grip, and a choice of either fixed sights or a rear sight fully adjustable for windage and elevation.

The model was widely used by law enforcement and military units in the United States, but it has since been superseded by polymer-framed striker-fired models from Glock, Heckler & Koch, SIG Sauer as well as Smith & Wesson's own M&P line of polymer framed handguns in both 9mm and .40 calibers.

== Variants ==
The first generation Smith & Wesson semi-auto pistol designations consist of two digits, such as Smith & Wesson Model 39 and Model 59.

Second generation pistols are designated by three digits; these include the Model 459, Model 659, etc. Many second generation designs were eventually upgraded with various improvements, thus becoming the third generation pistols; these are identified by the addition of a fourth digit to the second generation model number: 5903, 5904, 5905, 5906, etc.

There are exceptions to this numbering scheme, namely the third generation Value Series pistols such as the S&W Models 915 and 910, and the Model 457.

== 5900 series manufacturing history ==
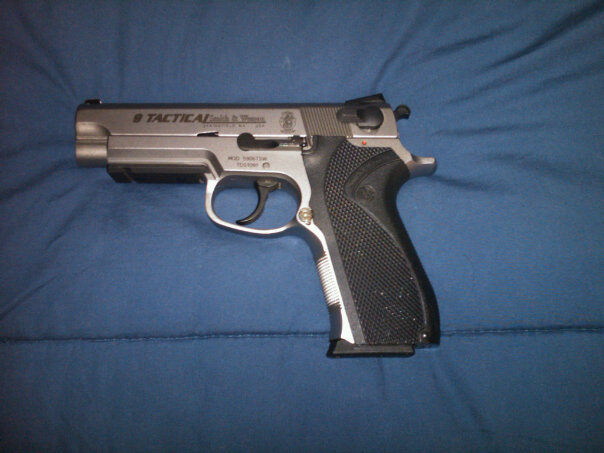
5906TSW

- The Model 5903 was manufactured from 1990 to 1997, and featured an aluminum alloy frame and a stainless steel slide with a 15-round double-stack magazine. Produced from 1989 to 1998.
- The Model 5904 has an aluminum alloy frame and blued carbon steel slide, also with a 15-round magazine, and inspired two other derivative pistols, the Smith & Wesson Models 915 and 910.
- The Model 5905 featured a carbon steel (blued) slide and frame, and was produced in 1991 only in very limited numbers.
- The Model 5906, produced from 1989 to 1999, is an all-stainless steel model, and is therefore significantly heavier than the aluminum-frame models in the 59XX series.
- The stainless steel double-action only variant of this pistol, the Model 5946, along with the Model 3953, produced from 1990 to 1999, was manufactured without safety levers, and is the primary issue service pistol of the Royal Canadian Mounted Police, Austin Police Department, Canadian Department of Fisheries and Oceans, as well as one of three pistols available for selection by New York City Police Department.
- The Model 5967 is a Lew Horton limited edition S&W model. Only 500 of these were made as a special offering in 1990. The pistol is a 3914 carbon steel slide on a 5906 stainless steel frame, two-tone tan polymer finish with brown Hogue grips. The sights are Novak Lo-Mount fixed three-dot sights. Product code is 103048, which is a 4-inch barrel and first (square) trigger guard.

== Users ==
- Bahamas: Royal Bahamas Defence Force.
- Canada: Fisheries and Oceans Fishery Officers (Model 5946)
- Japan: Japan Coast Guard.

=== Former ===
- Canada: Royal Canadian Mounted Police (Model 5946), being replaced by Glock 45s.
- Republic of China: National Police Agency (Model 5904)
- United States: New York City Police Department (Model 5946), Los Angeles Police Department (5906), Chicago Police Department, Illinois State Police (Model 5904),Colorado Springs Police Department (5906), and Honolulu Police Department (5906)
  - Puerto Rico: Puerto Rico Police Department (1990–2010) (Model 5906)
