= 2017 San Francisco UPS shooting =

Mass shooting in California, U.S.

San Francisco UPS shooting
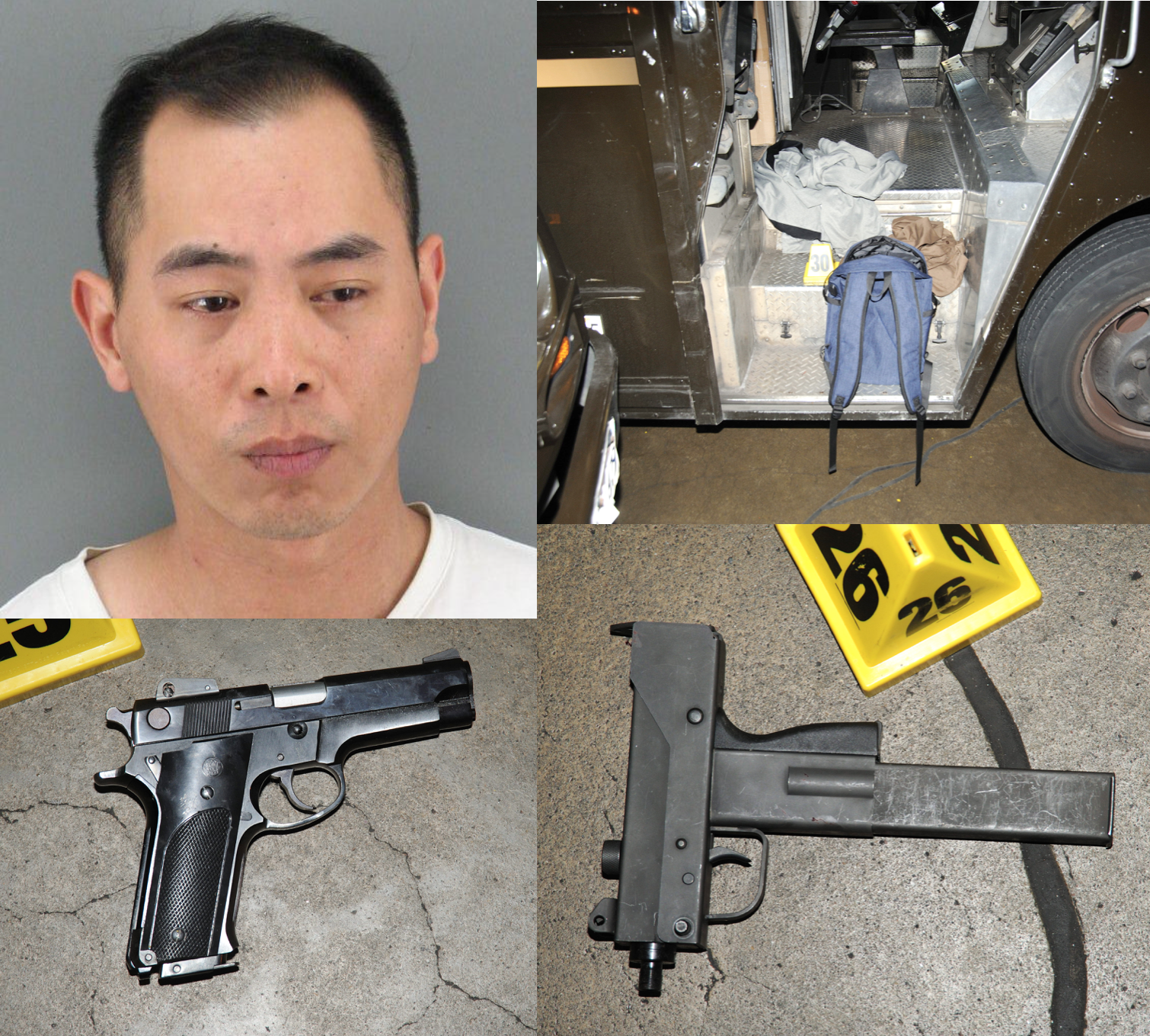
- Composite photograph released by SFPD on June 23, showing (clockwise from upper left): Lam; Backpack; MAC-10; semi-automatic pistol

- 2017 San Francisco UPS shooting (San Francisco)
- Location: 37.7652275°N 122.4082002°W; 320 San Bruno Ave, San Francisco, California, United States
- Date: June 14, 2017; 8:55 a.m (PST)
- Attack type: Mass shooting, Murder–suicide, workplace violence
- Weapons: MAC-10 pistol; Smith & Wesson Model 459 pistol (unused)
- Deaths: 4 (including the perpetrator)
- Injuries: 5 (2 by gunfire)
- Perpetrator: Jimmy Lam

On June 14, 2017, 38-year-old Jimmy Lam fatally shot three coworkers at a United Parcel Service (UPS) facility in the Potrero Hill neighborhood of San Francisco, California, United States. Lam then shot and killed himself as police arrived at the facility. Two others were wounded by gunfire, and three people were injured while escaping.

== Shooting ==
The incident happened at 8:55 a.m. during a morning meeting at a packaging and sorting UPS facility at 320 San Bruno Avenue in the Potrero Hill neighborhood of San Francisco. Upon arriving at the facility for work, Jimmy Lam set off the metal detector at the employee entrance, but was allowed to proceed inside the building. At the meeting, Lam singled out specific employees. Lam walked up to Benson Louie, 50, and shot him in the head without warning. As the other drivers fled the meeting, Lam shot Wayne Chan, 56, in the back. After shooting Louie and Chan, Lam shot and injured Alvin Xiao Chen and Edgar Perez inside the building before pursuing Mike Lefiti, 46, out into the street, where he killed Lefiti at the corner of 17th and San Bruno.

According to witnesses, UPS employees fled east from the building along 16th and 17th streets, and a group of approximately fifteen flagged down the passing 22-Fillmore bus to escape. Others sought shelter on the roof of the UPS facility. The police were called at 8:56 a.m., and after arriving at the site, they were told that Lam was an active shooter. After entering the building and conducting a brief search, the police found Lam near the bodies of Louie and Chan, holding the weapon to his head. Police officers ordered him to put the gun down, but Lam shot and killed himself. San Francisco Police Department (SFPD) Assistant Chief Toney Chaplin confirmed the responding officers did not fire any shots.

== Perpetrator ==
Jimmy Chanh Lam, 38, was born in Thailand and moved with his family to the U.S. when he was an infant. He was an 18-year veteran of UPS. Lam had to work three shifts that were nine-and-a-half hours in March, and filed an overtime grievance with management. According to a Teamsters Local 2785 union representative, the overtime grievance was not unusual. Lam was described by his coworkers as a "loner" who never displayed a temper. According to a senior coworker, Lam had taken a personal leave of absence several years ago that lasted several months, and had returned happier, but had recently "looked troubled" a few weeks prior to the shooting.

Lam had no violent criminal history. In 2010, he was arrested for driving under the influence (DUI) and hit-and-run charges after crashing into parked vehicles; he received three years of probation after pleading no contest. Lam was arrested for DUI again in 2013, after which he was sentenced to 10 days of community service and an additional month of probation. Lam's driver's license was suspended for a year starting in April 2014 for being a "negligent operator."

=== Weapons ===
According to the police, as reported by CBS San Francisco, both of the weapons that were recovered were stolen. Lam apparently only used one of the two, a semi-automatic MAC-10 pistol, from which he fired 20 rounds. A backpack was also recovered containing a 30-round magazine.

The weapon and magazine were stolen in Utah and are reported to be illegal in California. The second weapon, a Smith & Wesson Model 459 pistol, was reported stolen in Napa, California, and was not fired. A police spokesman stated that they had not determined who stole the weapons, when they were stolen, or how they came into Lam's possession.

== Victims ==
- Wayne Chan, 56, of San Francisco, a 28-year veteran at UPS.
- Mike "Big Mike" Lefiti, 46, of Hercules, a 17-year veteran at UPS.
- Benson Louie, 50, of San Francisco, a 17-year veteran at UPS.

Five injuries were reported, some of which were incurred when employees were fleeing the scene. A week after the shooting, drivers were still "scared, frustrated [...] on edge" and only four or five co-workers in Lam's unit had returned to work, with the remainder claiming worker's compensation.

A memorial service was held on July 9, 2017, at San Francisco City Hall for the slain men, attended by friends, family, coworkers, Mayor Ed Lee, and Representative Nancy Pelosi. A lawsuit was filed on behalf of the victims and their families in September 2017, alleging the shooting was preventable, as both metal detectors and security guards were on-site at the time of the shooting, and Lam had "seemed especially despondent" in the weeks leading up to the shooting, according to a co-worker.

On April 23, 2023, a shootout between two groups outside a nightclub in North Beach, San Francisco, left one dead and four wounded. Among the wounded was the son of Mike Lefiti, who was later arrested twice in connection with the gunfight and currently stands accused of murder.

== See also ==
- List of homicides in California
