= FBI Honorary Medals =

American law enforcement awards

Federal Bureau of Investigation Honorary Medals Program
- Description: Program recognizing exceptional acts by FBI employees and affiliated law enforcement personnel
- Country: United States
- Presented by: Federal Bureau of Investigation

The United States' Federal Bureau of Investigation instituted an Honorary Medals Program in 1989 as a way of recognizing "exceptional acts" by FBI employees and other law enforcement personnel working with the FBI. These medals were created to supplement the then-existing reward system within the Bureau.

== Program medals ==
There are four medals in the program intended for personnel: the FBI Star, the FBI Medal for Meritorious Achievement, the FBI Shield of Bravery, and the FBI Medal of Valor. One additional medal, the FBI Memorial Star, is for a surviving relative when a death has occurred in the line of duty. These medals are considered to be among the highest honors granted by the FBI, and fewer than 400 had been awarded as of March 2009.

== The FBI Star ==
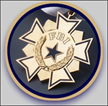

The FBI Star is awarded for serious injury sustained in the direct line of duty from physical confrontation with criminal adversaries, an injury inflicted by weapons, gunshot wounds inflicted in the line of duty, or an injury so severe that it would require substantial emergency room sutures, hospitalization, or comprehensive medical treatment for a sustained period of time.

One recipient of the FBI Star is Major Peter Norton of the British Army, who was severely injured when he triggered a secondary explosive device while attempting to clear an area where five American soldiers had been killed by a roadside bomb. Norton was also awarded the George Cross—the highest British award for acts of gallantry which did not take place in action directly against enemy forces, and also awarded for civilian gallantry—for this incident.

== The FBI Medal for Meritorious Achievement ==
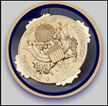

The FBI Medal for Meritorious Achievement is awarded for extraordinary and exceptional meritorious service in a duty of extreme challenge and great responsibility, extraordinary and exceptional achievements in connection with criminal or national security cases or projects, or a decisive, exemplary act that results in the protection or the direct saving of life in severe jeopardy in the line of duty.

Supervisory Special Agent Harold Bickmore of the FBI was the Medal for Meritorious Achievement for saving the life of a sixteen-year-old girl whom he found on the ground not breathing at the scene of a traffic accident on a major four-lane highway. He administered first aid on the spot, including CPR without any protection from blood-borne disease.

== The FBI Shield of Bravery ==
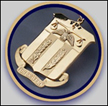

The FBI Shield of Bravery is presented for brave and courageous acts occurring in the line of duty or within the scope of FBI employment which may extend to major assistance to a task force or undercover operation, grave situations, or crisis confrontations associated with the highest priority cases of the FBI.

Shields of Bravery were awarded to Special Agent Ronald C. Eowan, Regional Security Officer Earl Miller of the State Department, and former Special Agent Paul Myers. They spent nearly four years in Indonesia under primitive conditions orchestrating a "highly complex ruse" that led to the arrests of 12 terrorists and the disruption of their network.

== The FBI Medal of Valor ==
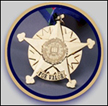

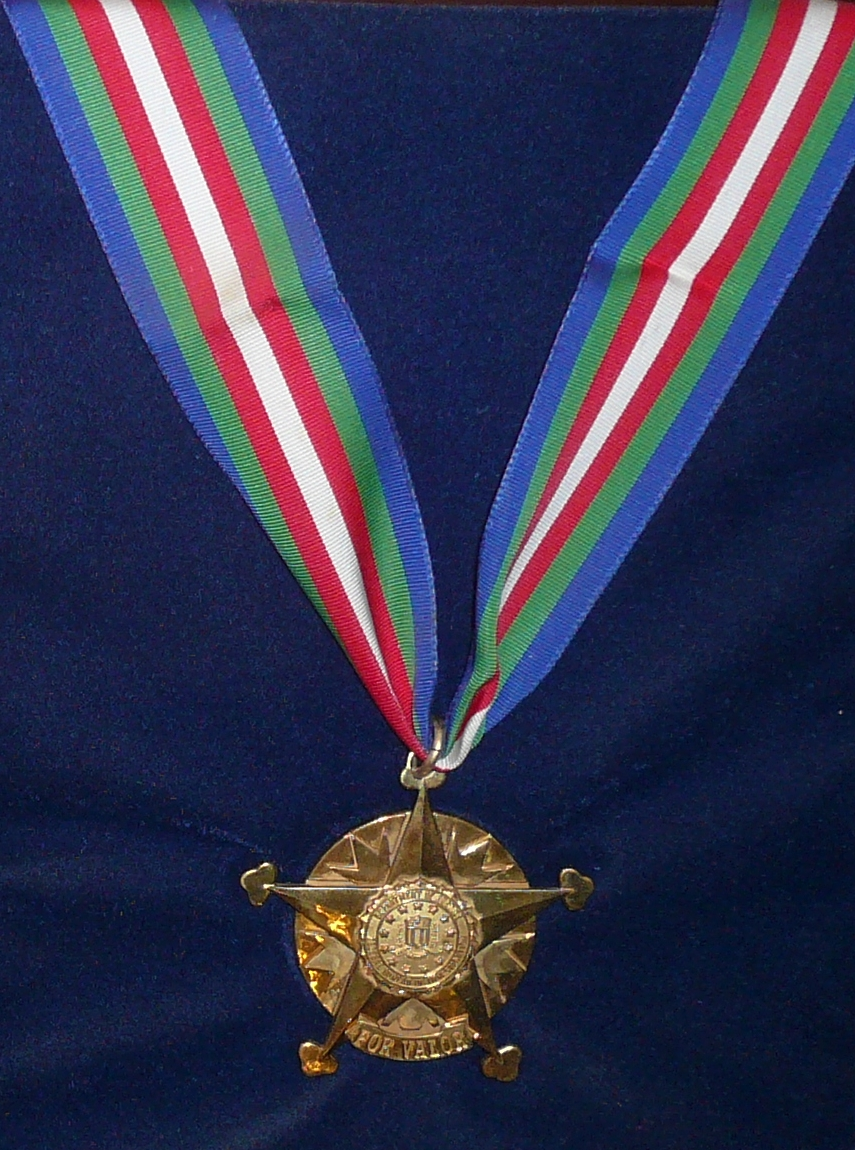
The FBI Medal of Valor.

The FBI Medal of Valor is presented in recognition of an exceptional act of heroism or voluntary risk of personal safety and life, and this act must have occurred in the direct line of duty or within the scope of FBI employment and in the face of criminal adversaries.

Special Agent Robert Merta was grazed by a bullet when he tackled a fugitive prison escapee who had drawn his gun on Merta and three other agents when they tried to arrest him. Merta received the Medal of Valor for risking his life to protect his fellow agents.

Special Agent Edmundo Mireles Jr. earned the Medal by ending the April 11, 1986 Miami Shootout. Despite being severely wounded by rifle fire, Mireles was able to engage the suspects, killing them. Mireles was the first one to receive the Medal of Valor in 1986.

== The FBI Memorial Star ==
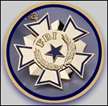

The FBI Memorial Star is presented to a surviving relative where death has occurred in the line of duty as the direct result of an adversarial action.

The family of Special Agent Paul M. Sorce, who died as a result of an auto accident in the line of duty, was given a Memorial Star.
