= In the Line of Duty: The F.B.I. Murders =

1988 television film by Dick Lowry

- Genre: Crime, Action, Drama, Thriller
- Based on: 1986 FBI Miami shootout
- Written by: Tracy Keenan Wynn
- Directed by: Dick Lowry
- Starring: David Soul; Ronny Cox; Michael Gross
- Theme music composer: Laurence Rosenthal
- Country of origin: United States
- Original language: English

Production
- Executive producers: Kenneth Kaufman; Michael Lepiner
- Producer: David R. Kappes
- Production location: Tampa, Florida
- Cinematography: Mike Fash
- Editors: Byron "Buzz" Brandt; Anita Brandt-Burgoyne
- Running time: 92 minutes
- Production companies: Telecom Entertainment Inc. World International Network

Original release
- Network: NBC
- Release: November 27, 1988

In the Line of Duty: The F.B.I. Murders (also known as Bloody Friday, FBI Murders), is a 1988 American made-for-television crime film. The film is based on the 1986 FBI Miami shootout, and stars Ronny Cox, Michael Gross and David Soul. The film was broadcast on NBC in November 1988.

== Plot ==
The film is based on the 1986 FBI Miami shootout that occurred on April 11, 1986. Two former army buddies, Michael Lee Platt (played by David Soul) and William Russell Matix (Michael Gross), commit a series of murders and bank robberies in Miami, Florida. Matix and Platt were close friends who ran a tree-cutting service, and both had Army commando training. Matix is supposedly a fundamentalist Christian who is also a suspect in the murder of his first wife in Ohio, and when his second wife asks him if he is guilty, Matix tells her to just go away. By the next morning, she has packed her bags and left with their children.

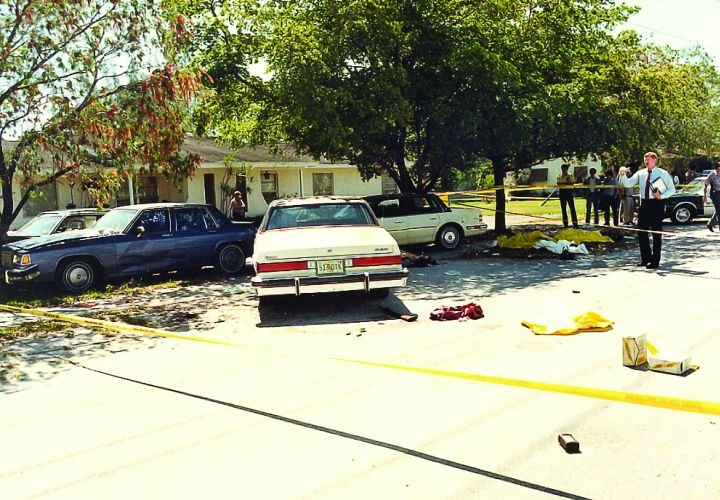
Crime scene photo of the FBI Miami shootout, showing suspect and agents' vehicles and battle debris. Photo by Miami-Dade PD

A team of FBI agents led by Benjamin Grogan (Ronny Cox) is designated to carry out the investigation. The event was described as "the most violent shoot-out in the history of the FBI." Two FBI agents were killed, and five agents were wounded. A placard in Miami honors Special Agents Jerry Dove and Benjamin Grogan, who were killed in the line of duty that day. As a result of the chaotic shootout between the agents and the two suspects, this incident is now used by the FBI as a training model for street confrontation.

== Cast ==
- Ronny Cox as FBI Special Agent Ben Grogan
- Bruce Greenwood as FBI Special Agent Jerry Dove
- David Soul as Mike Platt
- Michael Gross as Bill Matix
- Doug Sheehan as FBI Special Agent Gordon McNeill
- Randal Patrick as FBI Special Agent Ron Risner
- Peter McRobbie as FBI Special Agent John Hanlon
- Geoffrey Deuel as FBI Special Agent Gilbert M. Orrantia
- Ronald G. Joseph as FBI Special Agent Edmundo Mireles Jr.
- Richard Jenkins as Detective Hamill
- Lisa Rieffel as Suzanne McNeill
- Deborah May as Elaine McNeill
- Katie Layman as Liz Mireles
- Teri Copley as Vickie
- Anne Lange as Sandra
- Loren Peele as Corey, Sandra's Son
- Becky Ann Baker as Carol Ann
- Jamie Tirelli as Jose Collazo

== Background ==
Kenneth Kaufman, who is the executive producer on the film, said they initially took the project to ABC, and they weren't interested, and when they contacted NBC about the idea, they originally told them "don't even bother bringing it here." Kaufman recalls he convinced NBC into taking a meeting with him anyway, and on the day of the meeting they had changed their minds, telling Kaufman; "we just had a meeting and we need to buy some male oriented stuff." He went on to say that the film was originally titled The FBI Murders, and NBC suggested they add a handle to the title; In the Line of Duty.

== Production ==
Filming took place in May 1988, and was shot on location in the Tampa Bay area, with the final shootout scene staged in the neighborhood of Davis Islands. The shootout, which is the final scene in the movie, was choreographed to recreate the actual event, and took four days to film.

Michael Gross said they left some things out of the movie that actually happened during the incident, for instance, he recalls there was a woman who drove through the middle of the shootout, and when a neighbor informed her they were shooting "real bullets", she replied, "I can't wait, I'm late for my tennis lesson." Gross stated that the coroner had said that both of these men received "non-survivable wounds, but kept right on going." In addition, Gross disclosed that he had never shot a gun before this movie, and he prepared for his role by taking shooting lessons.

== Reception ==
The movie placed third as one of the top-rated, prime-time shows in the week it aired.

Nancy Morris of The Shreveport Journal said it was a "riveting movie which is fraught with more graphic violence than has ever been shown on the small screen." She also noted that "Gross is thoroughly convincing as a cold-blooded killer, as is Soul, and it takes a strong stomach to watch." Robert Dimatteo of The Winnipeg Sun wrote that the movie "creates a chilling sense of contemporary American society as a gun-happy landscape, where everyone seems to pack a pistol – or something larger", and the movie makes some "meager attempts to psychologize about the two killers."

Janis Froelich of the St. Petersburg Times wasn't impressed, writing that the movie, "doesn't do much more than demonstrate that actor Michael Gross (the sappy dad on Family Ties) can play a bad guy." She also highlighted that it's hard to "condense such a complex story in less than two hours." In his review for the Sun Sentinel, Bill Kelley opined that Gross portrayed his character "with quiet discipline and effectiveness – giving the best performance of his TV career."

Author Frank Sanello wrote in the Chicago Tribune, that Gross "obliterates the mold he created as Steven Keaton on Family Ties, and that fans of Gross may not even recognize him in the production with his slicked-back hair, blue-collar accent and Snidely Whiplash mustache." Michael Hill of The Washington Post said "the violent exploits of Bill Matix and Mike Platt punctuate the more quiet character development of the agents", and also opined that the final scene with the "climactic shootout is one of the most devastating scenes of its kind."

== See also ==
- List of FBI employees killed in the line of duty
