= 1986 FBI Miami shootout =

Deadly gun battle between FBI agents and criminals

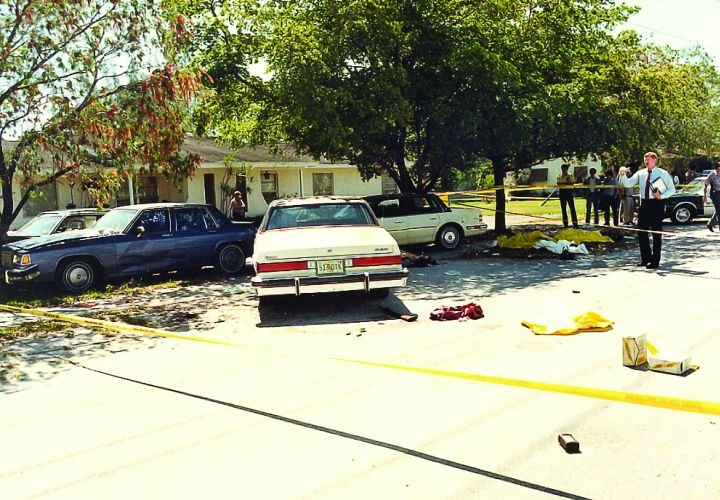
- Police crime scene photograph of the shootout's aftermath, showing suspect and agents' vehicles, a dropped shotgun, and battle debris.
- Location: 25.656819°N 80.326319°W; 12201 Southwest 82nd Avenue, Pinecrest, Dade County, Florida, U.S.
- Date: April 11, 1986; 40 years ago c. 9:35 – c. 9:40 a.m. (EST (UTC-5))
- Attack type: Shootout, attempted carjacking
- Weapons: Michael Lee Platt: Ruger Mini-14 .223 rifle; Smith & Wesson Model 586 .357 Magnum revolver; Dan Wesson .357 Magnum revolver; William Russell Matix: Smith & Wesson Model 3000 12-gauge shotgun; FBI agents: Remington 870 12-gauge shotguns; Smith & Wesson Model 459 9mm pistols; Smith & Wesson .357 Magnum and .38 Special revolvers
- Deaths: 4 (2 FBI agents and both suspects)
- Injuries: 5
- Perpetrators: Michael Lee Platt; William Russell Matix
- Defenders: Benjamin Grogan (deceased); Jerry Dove (deceased); Gordon McNeill; Richard Manauzzi; Edmundo Mireles Jr.; John Hanlon; Gilbert Orrantia; Ronald Risner
- Motive: Resisting arrest

On April 11, 1986, a shootout occurred between field agents for the Federal Bureau of Investigation (FBI) and two armed men in what is now Pinecrest, Miami-Dade County, Florida. The two men, former U.S. Army servicemen Michael Lee Platt and William Russell Matix, were suspected of committing a series of robberies and violent crimes, including a murder, in and around the Miami metropolitan area.

Although the FBI agents had partially surrounded the suspects after maneuvering them off a local road, they quickly found that the suspects were using more lethal weapons than theirs. During the ensuing shootout, Platt in particular was able to repeatedly return fire despite sustaining multiple hits.

The suspects shot and killed two special agents—Benjamin Grogan and Jerry Dove—and injured five other agents by gunfire. The shootout ended when the FBI agents killed both Platt and Matix as they were attempting to flee the scene.

The incident is infamous as one of the most violent episodes in the history of the FBI and is often studied in law enforcement training. The scale of the shootout led to the adoption by the FBI and many local police departments of more effective handguns; they primarily switched from revolvers to semi-automatics.

== Perpetrators ==
Michael Lee Platt (February 3, 1954 – April 11, 1986) and William Russell Matix (June 25, 1951 – April 11, 1986) met in the early 1970s while serving in the United States Army at Fort Campbell, Kentucky. Platt enlisted in the Army on June 27, 1972, as an infantryman. While in basic training, Platt applied for Army Airborne Ranger Training and subsequently entered the United States Army Air Assault School at Fort Campbell, upon completion of which he was assigned to the Military Police Unit. It was in this unit that he met and served with Matix. The two men became close friends and stayed in contact over the following decade, even while living in separate states. This is also where Platt met his first wife, Regina Lylen, whom he married in 1975.

Platt was honorably discharged in 1979, after which he moved to Florida with his wife and started a landscaping business called Blade Cutters with his brother, Tim. By December 1984, Platt and his wife had three children.

Matix first served in the United States Marine Corps, working as a cook (MOS 3371) in the officers' mess, and was stationed in Hawaii and Okinawa from April 1970 to March 1971 and April 1971 to March 1972 respectively, achieving the rank of Sergeant. He was honorably discharged on July 7, 1972. More than a year later, on August 10, 1973, Matix enlisted in the Army, serving with the military police under the 101st Airborne Division in Fort Campbell. He served as a Military Police Officer and Squad Leader; a Guard Supervisor for the Post Stockade; and finally, a Patrol Supervisor, before being honorably discharged on August 9, 1976.

Both Platt and Matix's former wives had died under violent circumstances. Matix's wife, Patricia Mary (née Buchanich) Matix, and a female co-worker, Joyce McFadden, both cancer researchers, were stabbed to death on December 30, 1983, at Riverside Methodist Hospital in Columbus, Ohio. Their bodies were found in the hospital laboratory; the women had been bound and gagged before the killer(s) stabbed them multiple times in the chest and neck. Matix was a suspect in the murders, but was never charged. He subsequently collected a $350,000 life insurance policy and later filed a $3 million wrongful death lawsuit against the Riverside Methodist Hospital.

After his first wife's death, Matix moved with his infant daughter Melissa to Florida at Platt's urging. Matix briefly worked at Blade Cutters, but he and Platt eventually left to start their own landscaping business called Yankee Clipper Tree Trimming Service. According to the pastor of the Riverside Baptist Church, where Matix regularly attended services, Matix had attempted to date a number of women in the congregation, describing how Matix used the church "the same way some people would use a singles bar." A woman in the congregation said he seemed eager to marry again.

In May 1985, Matix married Christy Lou Horne. Their relationship was troubled and Horne separated from Matix just two months later, after the latter had become enraged upon learning of her pregnancy. Matix and Horne's son was born shortly after Matix's death.

On December 21, 1984, Platt's wife, Regina, was found dead from a single shotgun blast to the mouth. Her death was ruled a suicide. Platt reportedly told investigators that he suspected Matix had carried on an affair with his wife. Several weeks after Regina's death, Platt married again, to his second wife, Brenda Horne. The family subsequently moved to a luxury housing development, close to where the later shootout with the FBI agents took place.

=== Crime spree ===
Before embarking on their crime spree, neither Platt nor Matix had a criminal record. At the time of the shootout, Platt's second wife, Brenda, claimed to have had no knowledge of the two men's prior crimes. Almost all of their robberies occurred on or near the South Dixie Highway (U.S. Route 1) in the southern Miami metropolitan area.

The following are the crimes that have been largely attributed to the two men:

- On October 4, 1985, Platt and Matix murdered 25-year-old Emilio Briel while he was target shooting at a rock pit in the Florida Everglades. The pair stole Briel's car, a gold 1977 Chevrolet Monte Carlo, and used it to commit several robberies. Briel's remains were found in March 1986 but not identified until May.
- On October 9, 1985, five days after killing Briel, Platt and Matix attempted to rob a Loomis armored van outside of a Steak and Ale restaurant in the 9000 block of Southwest 97th Avenue. They stole a duffel bag containing $2,825 from a courier who was walking back to the armored van, but were unable to break into the van as driver sped away before the robbers could steal the more than $400,000 inside.
- On October 16, 1985, Platt and Matix attempted to rob a Wells Fargo armored van that was servicing a Winn-Dixie supermarket at 7930 Southwest 104th Street. After ordering courier Jose Sanchez to freeze, one of the men wounded him in the leg with a shotgun; the other fired a rifle and possibly a handgun from the getaway vehicle. Two other guards returned fire, but neither Platt nor Matix was wounded. No money was taken in the botched robbery. Sanchez survived the shooting to make a full recovery.
- On October 17, 1985, Platt and Matix attempted to rob a Loomis armored van outside of a Dalts American Grill restaurant at 11641 Southwest 88th Street. The courier—the same one involved in the October 9 robbery—saw the two robbers as he was returning to the armored van, drew his revolver, and opened fire. The robbers did not shoot back and immediately fled the scene.
- On November 8, 1985, two robberies occurred within 90 minutes of each other. The first robbery happened at a Florida National Bank branch at 14801 South Dixie Highway, where Platt and Matix stole a bag containing $10,000 from a bank teller. A police officer briefly tailed them as they left the bank and managed to get the license plate number of the getaway vehicle. The second robbery happened at the Professional Savings Bank at 13100 South Dixie Highway, where the robbers stole $41,469 in three Wells Fargo money bags that had been delivered that morning.
- On January 10, 1986, Platt and Matix shot a Brinks Company courier as he opened the back door of his armored van at a Barnett Bank branch at 13593 South Dixie Highway. The courier was shot once in the back with a shotgun and twice more with a .223-caliber rifle, described by witnesses as an AR-15 or M16-style rifle, as he lay on the ground. Afterward, the robbers escaped with $54,000 in Briel's Chevrolet Monte Carlo. A civilian followed them to the parking lot of a nearby Burger King restaurant, where he saw the two men transferring the money and guns to a white Ford F-150 pickup truck. The courier survived the shooting but was left with more than 100 shotgun pellets in his body.
- On March 12, 1986, Platt and Matix robbed and shot 30-year-old Jose Collazo as he was target shooting at a rock pit in the Florida Everglades, in an almost identical manner to Briel's killing. Collazo was shot not far from where Briel was killed. According to Collazo, who survived the shooting, the two men arrived in a white Ford F-150 pickup truck and held him at gunpoint, taking the keys to Collazo's black 1979 Chevrolet Monte Carlo before shooting him three times in the back, arm, and head. Collazo played dead as the gunmen drove away in the F-150 and Monte Carlo; he then walked three miles to get help.
- On March 19, 1986, one week after shooting Collazo, Platt and Matix robbed a Barnett Bank branch, the same one they had targeted in the January 10 robbery. They stole $8,338 before fleeing in Collazo's Monte Carlo.

In response to the numerous bank robberies, the Federal Bureau of Investigation's Miami office formed the C-1 Miami Bank Robbery Squad, explicitly to combat these crimes. They referred to suspects as the "Unknown Gang" and discerned a pattern in their robberies: the men always committed the robberies on Fridays when the armored vans made their drop-offs. The FBI concluded that the robbers would likely commit another robbery on Friday, April 11, 1986.

== Events ==
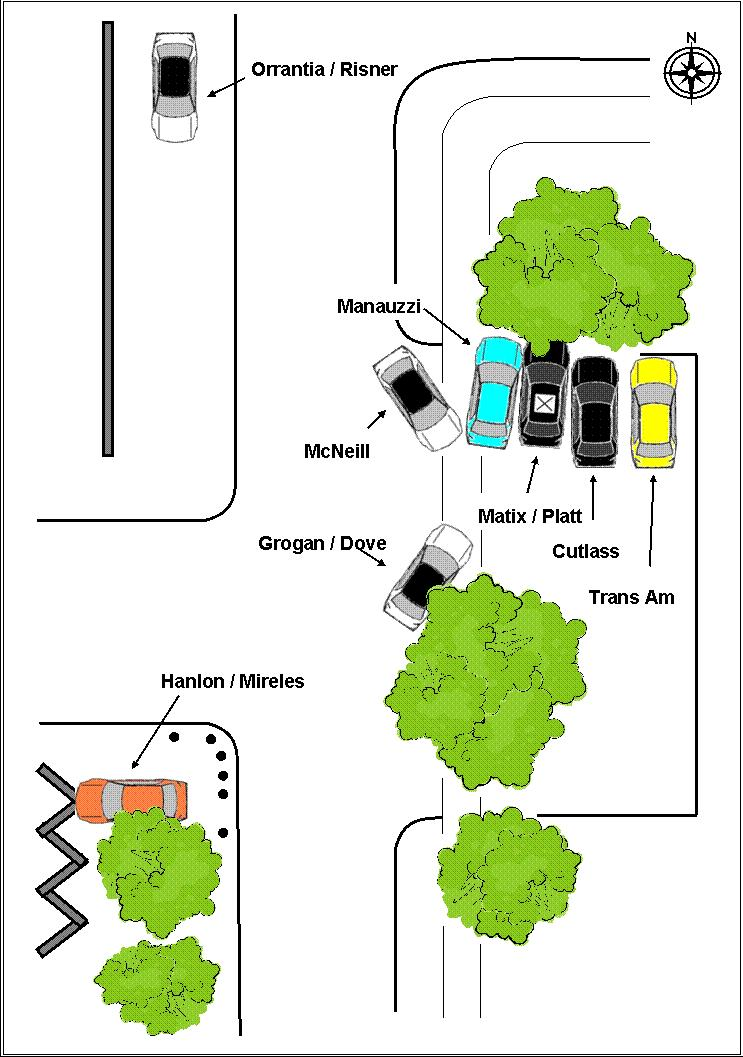
Relative positions of FBI agents' and suspects' vehicles after a traffic stop at 12201 Southwest 82nd Avenue, Pinecrest, Dade County, Florida. Illustration is not to scale.

=== Stakeout and attempted traffic stop ===
At 8:45 a.m. on April 11, 1986, a team of undercover FBI agents led by Special Agent Gordon McNeill assembled at a Home Depot to initiate a "rolling stakeout" in search of Collazo's Monte Carlo, acting on a hunch that the robbers would attempt a robbery that morning. Of the fourteen agents who participated in the stakeout, eight would take part in the shootout, deployed as follows in five unmarked cars:

- 44-year-old Supervisory Special Agent Gordon McNeill (20-year veteran)
- 43-year-old Special Agent Richard Manauzzi (15-year veteran)
- 52-year-old Special Agent Benjamin Grogan (25-year veteran), with 30-year-old Special Agent Jerry Dove (4-year veteran)
- 33-year-old Special Agent Edmundo Mireles Jr. (7-year veteran), with 48-year-old Special Agent John Hanlon (23-year veteran)
- 27-year-old Special Agent Gilbert Orrantia (4-year veteran), with 43-year-old Special Agent Ronald Risner (22-year veteran).

Of the agents involved, two had Remington 870 shotguns in their vehicles (McNeill and Mireles), three were armed with Smith & Wesson Model 459 9mm semi-automatic pistols (Dove, Grogan, and Risner), and the rest were armed with Smith & Wesson revolvers; two had .357 Magnums and five had .38 Specials. Two of the agents had backup .38 Special revolvers (Hanlon and Risner), which they both used during the shootout.

At around 9:30 a.m., agents Grogan and Dove were staking out a bank at the Barnett Shopping Center when they spotted the Monte Carlo, driven by Matix, and began to follow it after confirming that it was Collazo's vehicle. Two other unmarked cars, driven by Hanlon and Manauzzi, joined them. The agents attempted to conduct a traffic stop after the vehicles turned onto Southwest 82nd Avenue in the then-unincorporated village of Pinecrest.

Grogan pulled ahead of the Monte Carlo as it drove south, while Hanlon moved up alongside in an attempt to force Matix to pull over. Matix sped up and began slamming his car against Hanlon's. Manauzzi then rammed the Monte Carlo from behind, causing Matix to lose control of the vehicle, which spun around to face the opposite direction of travel. Hanlon, meanwhile, had crashed into the wall of a substation due to the damage his car had sustained from the Monte Carlo.

Now facing north, Matix tried to drive away, but was again rammed by Manauzzi. This collision sent the Monte Carlo nose first into a tree in a small parking area at 12201 Southwest 82nd Avenue. It was pinned between a parked Oldsmobile Cutlass on its passenger side and Manauzzi's car on the driver side.

Prior to ramming the Monte Carlo, Manauzzi had pulled out his service revolver and placed it on the seat in anticipation of a shootout. However, the collision had flung open the vehicle's door, and, reportedly, Manauzzi's gun either went flying out the door or was thrown to the floor. Hanlon also lost his .357 Magnum service revolver when his vehicle crashed, and had to resort to his Smith & Wesson Model 36 backup weapon. In addition, Grogan lost his glasses during this time, and there is speculation that, in the subsequent firefight, his vision may have been impaired enough to limit his aim and accuracy. This claim was disputed by the FBI's medical director, who stated that Grogan's vision was "not that bad".

=== Shootout ===
Platt, in the passenger seat of the Monte Carlo, brought up a Ruger Mini-14 semi-automatic rifle and opened fire at Manauzzi's car. Manauzzi was wounded in the head and back by bullet fragments as he stumbled out of his car. He was unable to recover his revolver and took cover behind a nearby wall for the remainder of the gunfight.

McNeill had turned around to catch up with the other agents; he arrived and began firing over the hood of Manauzzi's car.

Platt pulled back from the Monte Carlo's window, giving Matix opportunity to fire. Due to the collision damage, Matix could only partially open his door; he fired one blast of his Smith & Wesson Model 3000 shotgun at Grogan and Dove, striking their vehicle. Matix was shot in the right forearm, a hit credited to Grogan. As Matix pulled back, McNeill returned fire, hitting Matix with two rounds in the head and neck. Matix was apparently knocked unconscious by McNeill's hits and fired no more rounds. McNeill was shot in the hand by Platt. His wound and blood in his revolver's chambers prevented him from reloading.

At this point, Hanlon and Mireles ran across the street to join the fight, with Hanlon aiding Grogan, and Mireles moving to support McNeill. Quickly Platt fired at Mireles, severely wounding the agent in his left forearm and head and leaving him largely incapacitated.

Platt climbed out of the passenger side car window, and over the hood of the Cutlass that the Monte Carlo was pinned against. As he did so, one of Dove's bullets passed through his right upper arm and struck his chest, stopping an inch away from his heart. The autopsy found that Platt's right lung had collapsed and his chest cavity contained 1.3 liters of blood, suggesting damage to the main blood vessels of the right lung. Of his many gunshot wounds, this wound was the primary one responsible for Platt's eventual death. Platt was then shot twice more, in the right thigh and left foot respectively. These bullets are also believed to have been fired by Dove. (Note: After Platt crawled out the window and was rolling off the front hood of the Cutlass, he likely was hit twice more. (This was asserted by Dr. Anderson based on his later forensic analysis.) Around this time, Risner and Orrantia arrived and began providing covering fire for the other agents.

Platt took cover by the passenger side front fender of the Cutlass. After shooting a .357 Magnum revolver at Risner and Orrantia, he was wounded a fourth time when turning to fire at Hanlon, Dove, and Grogan. Orrantia's bullet penetrated Platt's right forearm, fractured the radius bone, and exited the forearm. This wound caused Platt to drop his revolver. It is estimated that Platt was quickly shot a fifth time, by Risner. The bullet penetrated Platt's right upper arm, exited below the armpit and entered his torso, stopping below his shoulder blade. The wound was not serious.

Platt fired one round from his Ruger Mini-14 at Risner's and Orrantia's position, wounding Orrantia in the left shoulder with shrapnel created by the bullet's passage, and two rounds at McNeill. One round hit McNeill in the neck, causing him to collapse and leaving him paralyzed for several hours. Platt apparently positioned the Mini-14 against his shoulder and, using his uninjured left hand, continued firing.

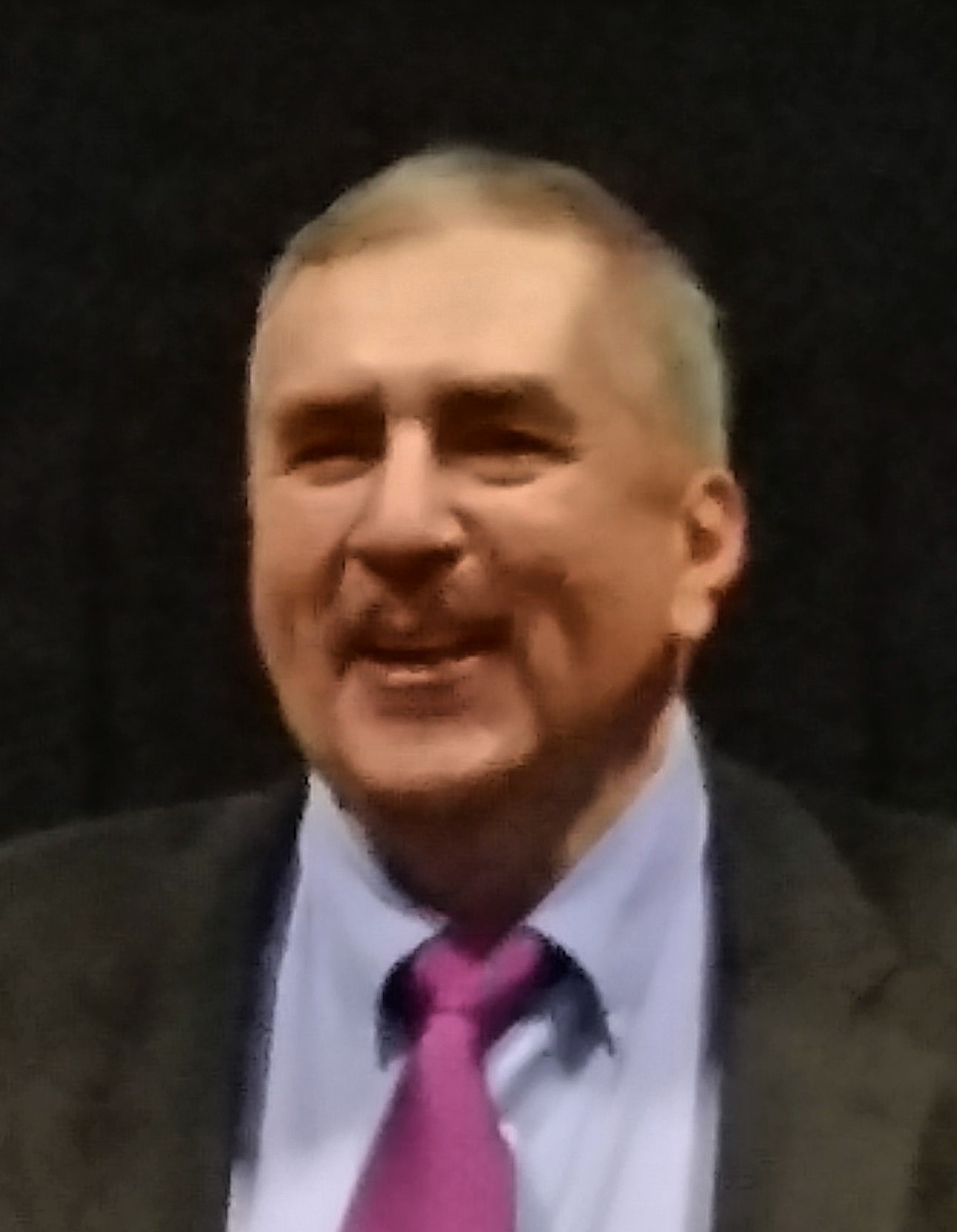
Edmundo Mireles Jr. earned the FBI Medal of Valor for killing both suspects while badly injured

Dove's 9 mm pistol was rendered inoperative after being hit by one of Platt's bullets, while Hanlon was shot in the hand while reloading. Grogan and Dove took position kneeling alongside the driver's side of their car. Both were preoccupied with getting Dove's weapon working and did not detect that Platt was aggressively advancing upon them. Platt rounded the rear of their car and killed Grogan with a shot to the chest, shot Hanlon in the groin area, and then killed Dove with two shots to the head.

Platt got into Grogan and Dove's car in an apparent attempt to flee the scene. At this point in the gunfight, Dove had relocated from behind the passenger side door of his car. As he did so, Mireles fired the first of five rounds from his shotgun, wounding Platt in both feet. He was wounded and could use only one arm.

Matix had regained consciousness and joined Platt in the FBI unmarked car. Mireles fired four more rounds at Platt and Matix, but hit neither.

Around this time, Metro-Dade police officers Rick Frye, Leonard Figueroa, and Martin Heckman arrived. Heckman covered McNeill's paralyzed body with his own, while Frye assisted Hanlon. None of the officers fired any shots.

Platt's actions at this moment in the fight have been debated. A civilian witness described Platt leaving the car, walking almost 20 feet and firing at Mireles three times at close range. Mireles does not remember this happening, nor do Heckman, Risner, and Orrantia, who were observing from the other side of the street. But it is known that Platt pulled Matix's Dan Wesson revolver at some point and fired three rounds with it.

As Platt attempted to start Grogan and Dove's car, Mireles drew his .357 Magnum revolver, moved parallel to the street, and directly toward Platt and Matix. Mireles fired six rounds at the suspects. The first round missed, hitting the back of the front seat. The second hit the driver's side window post and fragmented, with one small piece hitting Platt in the scalp. Bullets three, four, and five all hit Matix in the face. Bullet three fragmented in two, neither piece causing a serious wound. Bullet four struck beside Matix's right eye socket, travelling downward through the facial bones into the neck, where it entered the spinal column and severed the spinal cord. Bullet five penetrated Matix's jawbone and neck, coming to rest by the spinal column. Mireles reached the driver's side door, extended his revolver through the window, and fired his sixth and last shot at Platt. The bullet penetrated Platt's chest and bruised the spinal cord. These shots fatally injured both Matix and Platt, ending the gunfight.

The shootout involved ten people: two suspects and eight FBI agents. Of the ten, only Special Agent Manauzzi did not fire any shots (having lost his firearm in the initial collision), and only Special Agent Risner survived unscathed. The incident lasted less than five minutes, during which time approximately 145 shots were exchanged.

Toxicology tests suggested that Platt and Matix had fought through multiple traumatic gunshot wounds purely on adrenaline; both were drug-free at the time of their deaths.

== Weaponry and wounds ==
=== Agents ===
==== Killed ====
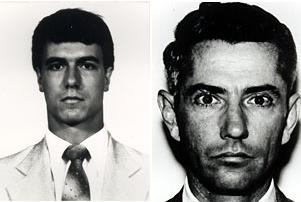
Jerry Dove (left) and Benjamin Grogan (right), the two FBI agents killed in the shootout

- Benjamin Grogan: Smith & Wesson Model 459 9 mm semi-automatic pistol, nine rounds fired. Killed by a .223 gunshot wound to the chest.
- Jerry Dove: Smith & Wesson Model 459 9mm semi-automatic pistol, 20+ rounds fired. Killed by two .223 gunshot wounds to the head.

==== Wounded ====
- Richard Manauzzi: lost control of weapon in the initial vehicle collision, no shots fired. Minor wounds from bullet fragments.
- Gordon McNeill: Smith & Wesson Model 19 .357 Magnum revolver (not FBI issue, but personally owned .357's and .38's could be approved for carry by supervisors, same applies with Mireles's Smith & Wesson Model 686), six rounds .38 Special +P fired. Seriously wounded by .223 gunshot wounds to the right hand and neck.
- Edmundo Mireles: Remington 870 12-gauge pump-action shotgun, five rounds of 00 buckshot fired; .357 Magnum revolver; Smith & Wesson Model 686, six rounds .38 Special +P fired. Seriously wounded by .223 gunshot wounds to the left forearm and head.
- Gilbert Orrantia: Smith & Wesson (model unknown, likely a Smith & Wesson Model 13, as it was an issued weapon at the time) .357 Magnum revolver, 12 rounds .38 Special +P fired. Wounded by shrapnel and debris produced by a .223 bullet near miss.
- John Hanlon: Smith & Wesson Model 36 .38 Special revolver, five rounds .38 Special +P fired. Seriously wounded by .223 gunshot wounds to the right hand and groin.

==== Uninjured ====
- Ronald Risner: Smith & Wesson Model 459 9 mm pistol, 14 rounds fired, Smith & Wesson Model 60 .38 Special revolver, one round .38 Special +P fired.

=== Perpetrators ===
- William Matix: Smith & Wesson Model 3000 12-gauge pump shotgun, one round of #6 shot fired. Killed after being shot six times.
- Michael Platt: Ruger Mini-14 .223 Remington semi-automatic rifle, at least 42 rounds fired, Smith & Wesson Model 586 .357 Magnum revolver, three rounds fired, Dan Wesson .357 Magnum revolver, three rounds fired. Killed after being shot 12 times.

== Aftermath ==
A subsequent FBI investigation placed partial blame for the agents' deaths on the lack of stopping power exhibited by their service handguns. While some agents were equipped with 9 mm semi-automatic pistols, most had revolvers, which made up the majority of the weapons used in the fight. The FBI soon began a search for a more powerful cartridge to issue to all agents. Noting the difficulties of reloading a revolver while under fire, the FBI specified that agents should be armed with box magazine-fed semi-automatic pistols. This incident contributed to the increasing trend for law enforcement agencies to switch from revolvers to semi-automatics across the United States.

In the aftermath, the FBI collaborated with Smith & Wesson to develop the S&W Model 1076 chambered for the 10mm Auto round. There is a persistent myth that the 10mm's sharp recoil proved too much for most agents to control effectively, and a special reduced velocity loading was developed; commonly called the "10 mm Lite" or "10 mm FBI". However, the FBI developed its reduced velocity 10mm cartridge before the 1076 pistol was developed to fire it. No agents were ever issued full power 10mm ammunition, because the reduced velocity ammunition was developed before the FBI selected the 10mm cartridge. Soon afterwards Smith & Wesson developed a shorter cased cartridge based on the 10 mm, the .40 S&W. (Note: The 10 mm and .40 S&W are identical in projectile diameter, both using a 0.400" caliber bullet.)

Other issues were brought up in the aftermath of the shooting. Although the field agents were on the lookout for two violent suspects known to use firearms during their crimes, only two of the FBI vehicles contained shotguns (in addition to Mireles, McNeill had a shotgun in his car, but was unable to reach it before or during the shootout), and none of the agents was armed with a rifle. In addition, only two of the agents were wearing bulletproof vests. Their 'armor' was standard light body armor, designed to protect against handgun rounds, not the .223 Remington rounds fired by Platt's Mini-14 rifle.

The other six agents involved in the stakeout in six vehicles had additional weaponry, including Remington shotguns, Heckler & Koch MP5 submachine guns, and M16 rifles. But they did not reach the shootout in time to participate.

Ronald Risner died on June 14, 2002, and Gordon McNeill died on January 1, 2004.

=== Lawsuit ===
After the shootout, the families of agents Jerry Dove and Benjamin Grogan sued the estates of Platt and Matix under the RICO statute for damages. The lawsuit was dismissed, because the families did not allege the "kind of recovery that RICO was designed to afford."

=== Memorial ===
In 2001, the Village of Pinecrest, Florida, which incorporated in 1996, honored the two fallen agents by co-designating a portion of Southwest 82nd Avenue as Agent Benjamin Grogan Avenue and Agent Jerry Dove Avenue. Street signs and a historical marker commemorate the naming of the roadway in Grogan and Dove's honor.

Dove, a West Virginia native, had Jerry Dove Drive named after him in Bridgeport, West Virginia, leading to Clarksburg, West Virginia where the FBI Criminal Justice Information Services Division is located. He had earned degrees from both West Virginia University and Marshall University.

In 2014, the FBI Miami field office moved to new quarters in Miramar, Florida. The two towers of the new office space were dedicated in memory of Dove and Grogan in a ceremony in April 2015. The first floor contains a memorial to Dove and Grogan. Every year on April 11, the FBI Miami office holds a fallen agent ceremony in honor of Dove, Grogan, and all FBI agents killed in the line of duty.

== Media adaptations ==
- In 1988, NBC produced the made-for-television movie In the Line of Duty: The F.B.I. Murders depicting the circumstances leading up to and including the shootout, one of several films in the In the Line of Duty series produced during the 1980s and 1990s. Michael Gross portrayed William Matix and David Soul portrayed Michael Platt. Ronny Cox portrayed Ben Grogan, and Jerry Dove was portrayed by Bruce Greenwood.
- An episode of the short-lived TV series FBI: The Untold Stories featured a portrayal of the shootout.
- The event is the subject of an episode of the Discovery Channel's series The FBI Files sub-titled "Firefight", originally aired: March 2000.
- In 2012, Investigation Discovery aired an episode of Real Vice Miami that recounts the shootout in detail. Rey Hernandez portrayed William Matix and Nestor Lao portrayed Michael Platt. Robb Erwin portrayed Ben Grogan and Jerry Dove was portrayed by Alexis Aguilar. The program includes first-person commentary by retired FBI Special Agents Gil Orrantia and John Hanlon, who both survived the gunfight.

== See also ==
- Newhall incident
- North Hollywood shootout
- Norco shootout
- 2021 Sunrise, Florida shootout
- The Battle of Barrington
- List of serial killers in the United States
