= Peter Norton (British Army officer) =

Recipient of the George Cross

Major Peter Norton GC
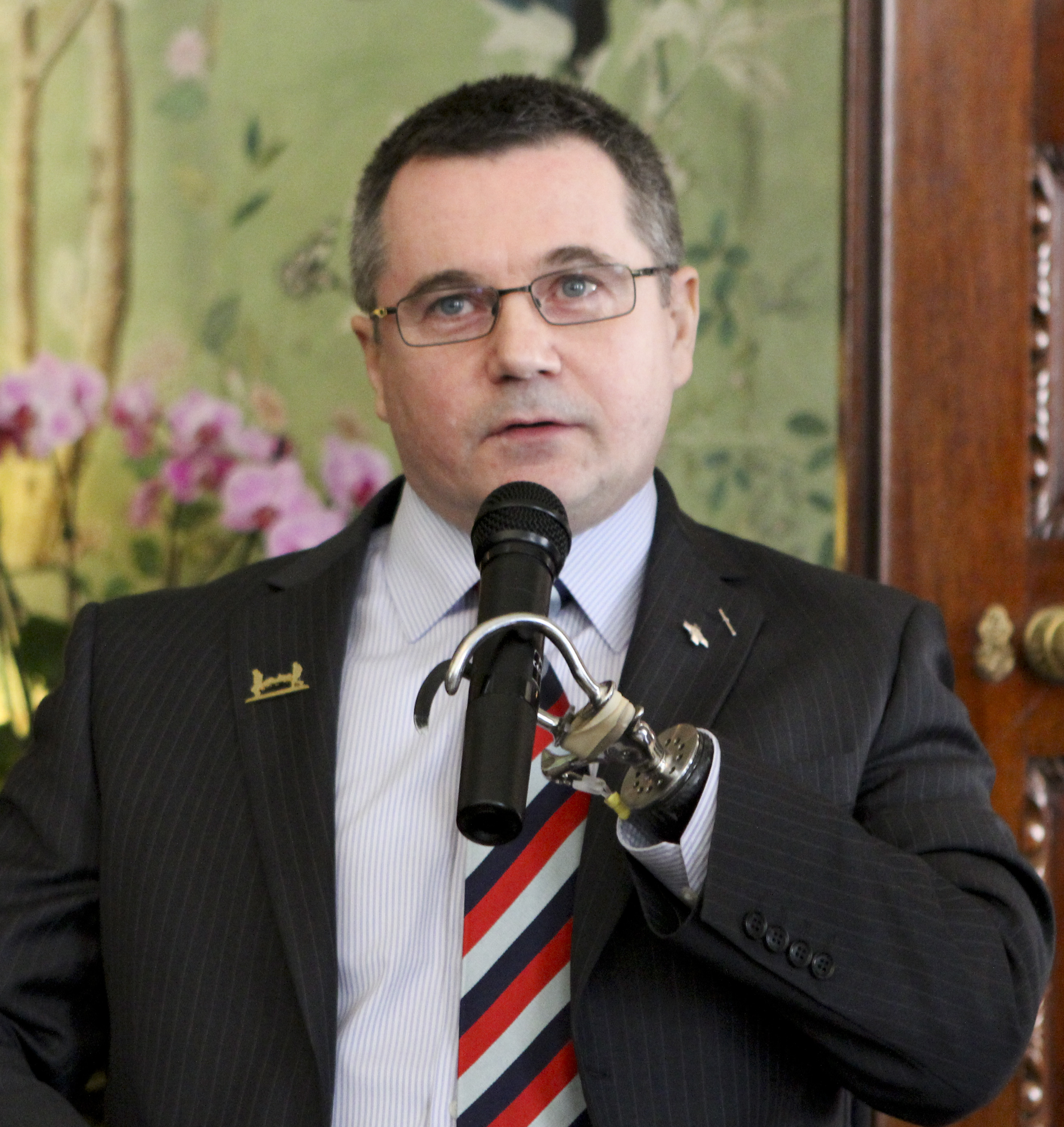
- Peter Norton in March 2013
- Born: 10 December 1962 (age 63); Edmonton, London
- Military career
- Allegiance: United Kingdom
- Branch: British Army
- Service years: 1983–2013
- Rank: Major
- Service number: 24592939; 557344 (after commission)
- Unit: Royal Logistic Corps
- Conflicts: The Troubles; Iraq War
- Awards: George Cross; FBI Star (United States)

Major Peter Allen Norton, GC (born 10 December 1962) is a retired ammunition technical officer with the British Army's Royal Logistic Corps who was awarded the George Cross for his service in Iraq.

== Early life ==
Norton was born in Edmonton, London, but grew up in Margate, Kent.

== Military career ==
Norton joined the Royal Army Ordnance Corps (which later amalgamated into the Royal Logistic Corps) as a private in 1983. He reached the rank of warrant officer class 1 and was appointed a conductor, the most senior non-commissioned appointment in the British Army, before being commissioned as a captain on 8 July 2002.

=== George Cross ===
Norton deployed to Iraq in 2005, where he was second-in-command of the American Combined Explosives Exploitation Cell (CEXC) based in the outskirts of Baghdad. Going to the aid of a United States Army patrol that had been attacked by an improvised explosive device (IED) on 24 July 2005, he was checking for the presence of further devices when a secondary victim-operated IED exploded. He lost his left leg and part of his left arm, and he sustained serious injuries to his other leg and lower back. Despite his injuries, he continued to give instructions to his team, suspecting that further devices might be in the vicinity. He refused to be evacuated until he was certain that all personnel on the ground were aware of the danger. A third device was subsequently located and dealt with the following day.

Norton was awarded the George Cross for his actions. The announcement for the medal was gazetted in a supplement to the London Gazette of 24 March 2006. Since his team contained two special agents of the FBI, Christopher Rigopoulos and Nicholas Boshears, Norton was also awarded the FBI Star on 27 March 2009.

=== Later service ===
Norton was promoted to major on 31 July 2008. After a 30-year career, he retired from the army on 1 August 2013 on medical grounds.

== Honours ==
Norton received the FBI Star from the Federal Bureau of Investigation on 27 March 2009, and the United States Army Commendation Medal. He was also awarded the Thornton Medal by the Institute of Materials, Minerals and Mining in May 2013, and an Honorary Doctorate by Canterbury Christ Church University in January 2017.
