= Edmundo Mireles Jr. =

American federal law enforcement officer

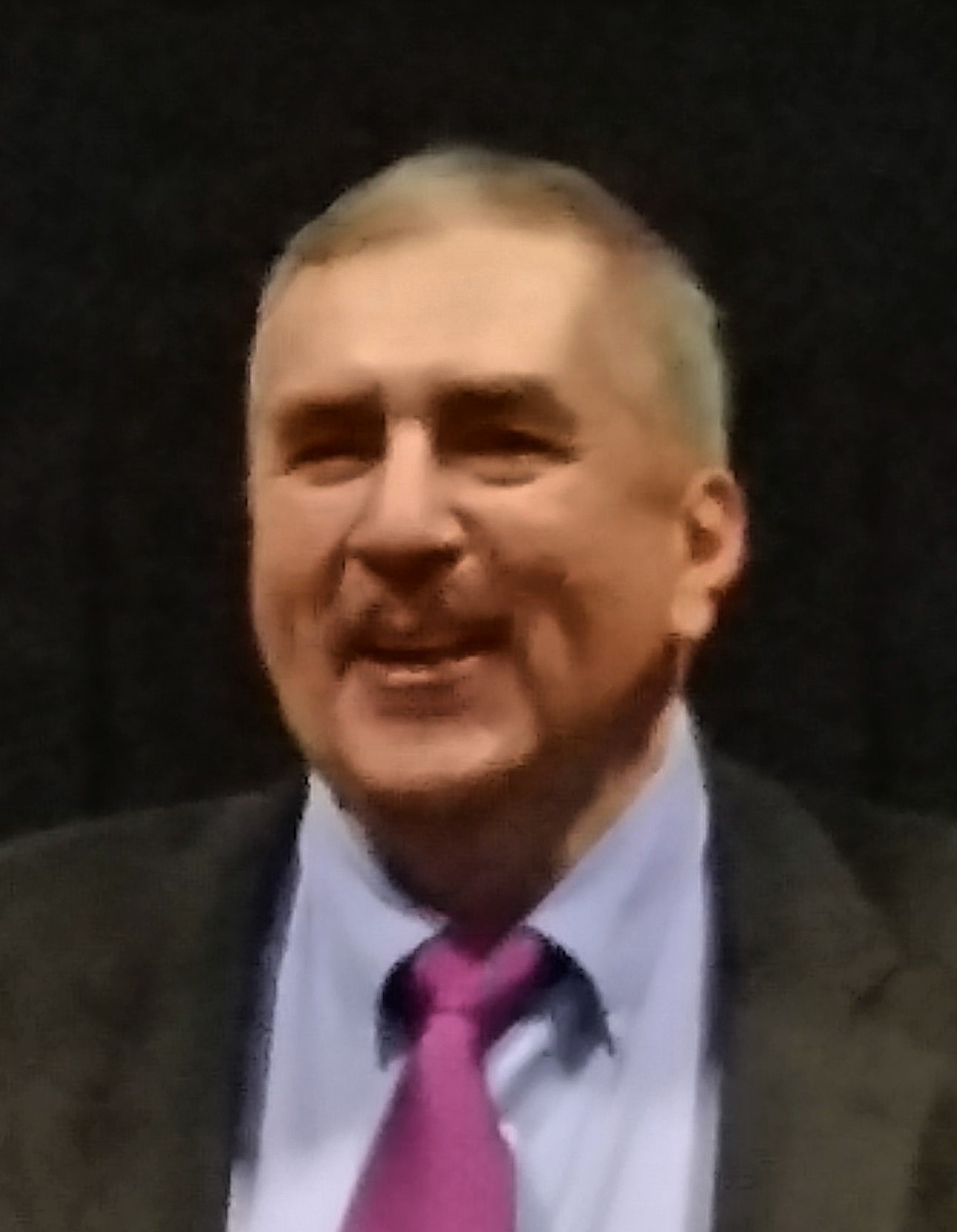
- Mireles in 2016
- Born: March 4, 1953 (age 73); Alice, Texas, U.S.
- Education: University of Maryland
- Employer: Federal Bureau of Investigation
- Children: 3
- Awards: FBI Medal of Valor

Edmundo "Ed" Mireles Jr. (born March 4, 1953) is an American former special agent of the Federal Bureau of Investigation (FBI), known for his part in the 1986 FBI Miami shootout. He was awarded the Medal of Valor (FBI Medal of Valor), and elected the Police Officer of the Year.

== Life and early career ==
Edmundo Mireles was born in Alice and grew up in Beeville, Texas. He served in the United States Marine Corps from 1971 to 1973 and fought in two tours in the Vietnam War, then graduated with a Bachelor of Business Administration from the University of Maryland in January 1979, and joined the FBI in September of the same year.

After an initial posting in the FBI in Washington, D.C., he was transferred in 1985 to Miami. He married fellow FBI agent Elizabeth "Liz" Mireles with whom he has two sons. He has one son from a previous marriage.

== Shootout ==
In late 1985 and early 1986 two armed men had robbed a series of banks, and killed a number of people in Florida. The FBI assembled a stakeout team searching for the car they were believed to be travelling in.

On April 11, 1986, the two suspects were sighted and forced off the road. Immediately, fierce shooting broke out between the two suspects and the eight FBI agents. Within minutes, Special Agents Jerry Dove and Benjamin P. Grogan were killed and five others were seriously injured. Edmundo Mireles was hit in his left arm, but fired back at them with a shotgun while lying wounded on the floor, hitting one of the perpetrators in the feet, and was himself wounded again. After the two had gotten into a police vehicle, Mireles stood up, went towards them and shot the two of them dead at short range with his personal .357 Magnum S&W Model 686 revolver.

He collapsed shortly thereafter and was sent to the South Miami Hospital. His left arm remained impaired, but he returned to the service after a year of recovery and became an instructor at the FBI Academy in Quantico, Virginia. Later, he returned to his former Miami office and also served in the Omaha, Nebraska, Field Office.

== Discrimination suit ==
Along with more than half the agency's Hispanic staff, he was involved in a 1988 discrimination suit against the FBI.

== Aftermath ==
Mireles and his wife continued their work with the FBI until their retirement in March 2004.

== Awards ==
- On April 10, 1990, he was the first agent ever to be honored with the Medal of Valor (FBI Medal of Valor); he received the award from FBI Director William S. Sessions.
- On October 7, 1986, he was voted Police Officer of the Year by the International Association of Chiefs of Police
