= Smith & Wesson Model 59 =

- Smith & Wesson Model 59 at the Imatra Border Museum
- Type: Semi-automatic pistol
- Place of origin: United States

Service history
- Used by: United States

Production history
- Manufacturer: Smith & Wesson
- Produced: 1971–1982

Specifications
- Mass: 30 oz / 1.84 lb (0.840 kg)
- Length: 7.55 in (192 mm)
- Barrel length: 4 in (102 mm)
- Cartridge: 9×19mm Parabellum, 7.65×21mm Parabellum
- Action: DA/SA
- Rate of fire: Semi-automatic
- Feed system: 14-round double column, detachable box magazine (20-round factory magazines were available)
- Sights: Fixed iron sights, optional adjustable

The Smith & Wesson Model 59 is a double-action pistol produced from 1971 to 1982. It was developed by Smith & Wesson from the earlier Smith & Wesson Model 39 by adapting a 14-round capacity stagger-stack magazine.

== History and users ==
The Model 59 was designed for the U.S. Navy as a large-capacity version of the S&W Model 39, the basis of their Mark 22 "Mark 22 Hush Puppy" suppressed pistol. In 1965, the U.S. Navy commissioned a version of the S&W Model 39 that could take the 13-round magazine of the Browning Hi-Power. In early 1970, a dozen experimental all-stainless-steel prototypes were made and were issued to Navy SEAL commandos for evaluation in the field, but it was not adopted.

The Model 59 went on the market in 1971. It went out of production a decade later in 1982 when the improved second generation series was introduced (the Model 459). All total, approximately 231,841 M59s were produced.

== Design ==
The Model 59 was manufactured in 9×19mm Parabellum caliber with a wider anodized aluminum frame, a straight backstrap, a magazine disconnect (the pistol will not fire unless a magazine is in place), and a blued carbon steel slide that carries the manual safety. The grip consists of three pieces made of two nylon plastic panels joined by a metal backstrap. It uses a magazine release located to the rear of the trigger guard, similar to the M1911A1.

== Magazine ==
The magazine for the Model 59 is similar to that of the Browning Hi-Power. Initially introduced with a capacity of 14 rounds, this was later increased to 15 rounds for future variants. Smith & Wesson also made an extended 20-round version. Many firearms have been introduced to use this pattern of magazine including the Marlin Camp carbine as well as the Kel-Tec P11, and Sub2000.

== Model 459 ==
The Smith & Wesson Model 459 was an updated version of the Model 59 with adjustable sights and checkered nylon grips. This model was discontinued in 1988. 803 units were produced in a brush finish with special grips made to FBI specifications.

== Users ==
- United States
  - Salt Lake City Police Department Carried until switched to the Smith & Wesson Model 66 revolver.
  - Federal Bureau of Investigation About 800 Smith & Wesson 459s issued to Agents.
