= Smith & Wesson Model 686 =

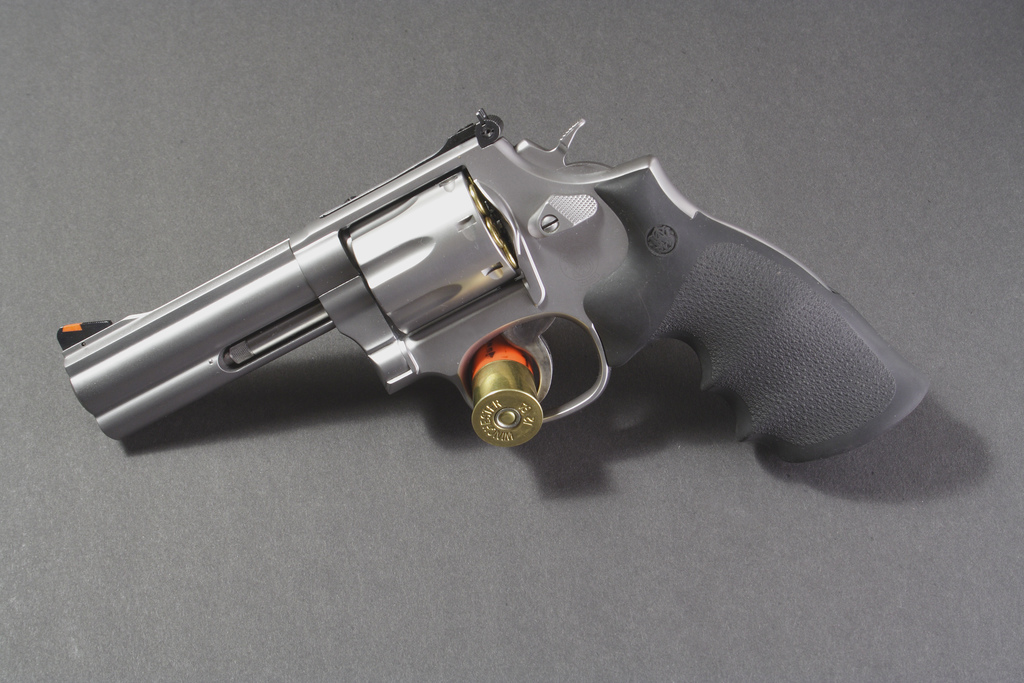
- A Smith & Wesson Model 686, with a 100 mm (4 in) barrel.
- Type: Revolver
- Place of origin: United States

Service history
- Used by: See Users

Production history
- Designed: 1980
- Produced: 1981–present
- Variants: 686-(1 through 7); 686P (Plus); 686PP (PowerPort)

Specifications
- Mass: 1.25 kg (2.8 lb)
- Length: 305 mm (12.0 in)
- Barrel length: 64 mm (2.5 in); 76 mm (3 in); 100 mm (4 in); 150 mm (6 in); 211.5 mm (8.325 in)
- Cartridge: .357 Magnum; .38 Special
- Caliber: .38/.357
- Action: Double action and single action
- Feed system: 6-round (686) or 7-round (686 Plus) cylinder

The Smith & Wesson Model 686 is a six- or seven-shot double-action revolver manufactured by Smith & Wesson and chambered for the .357 Magnum cartridge; it will also chamber and fire .38 Special cartridges. Smith & Wesson introduced the Model 686 in 1981. It is the stainless steel version of the Model 586, which features a blued steel finish. They are available ported and unported with a choice of 6- or 7-round cylinders.

The Model 686 is based on S&W's L (medium) revolver frame. During the 1980s, Smith & Wesson developed its L-Frame line of .357 Magnums: the Model 581, Model 586, Model 681 and Model 686. The Models 581 and 681 have fixed sights, whereas the 586 and 686 use adjustable sights.

== Variants ==
The 686 has been available with 2.5, 3, 4, 5, 6, 7 and 8 inch barrel lengths as standard models and other barrel lengths either by special order from S&W's Performance Center custom shop, or acquired from or built by after-market gunsmiths. The Performance Center made a limited number of Model 686s chambered for .38 Super cartridges for competitive shooters.

The 686 features a 6-round cylinder. The 686P variant, marketed as the Model 686 Plus, has a 7-round cylinder. The 686PP variant, with PP designating PowerPort, has an integral compensator (also known as a muzzle brake).

The 686 has been made with pistol grips having a squared or rounded end (colloquially, "square butt" or "round butt"). The grips on the pistol can be changed, and multiple after-market options are available.

The Model 686 has an adjustable rear sight, and until 1992, the 152 and 211 mm (6 and 8.325 in) versions had the option of an adjustable front sight. They had gonçalo alves hardwood grips until 1994, when the grip was replaced by a rubber Hogue grip.

Through the years, there have been several variations on the Model 686. The Model 686 Classic Hunter was introduced in 1988 and has a 150 mm (6 in) barrel and a non-fluted cylinder; the Model 686 Black Stainless was introduced in 1989 and has either a 100 or 150 mm (4 or 6 in) barrel with a black finish, with production limited to 5000; the Model 686 National Security Special was introduced in 1992 and has a 76 or 102 mm (3 or 4 in) barrel; the Model 686 Target Champion was introduced in 1992 and has a 150 mm (6 in) match-grade barrel, adjustable trigger stop, and walnut grips; the Model 686 Power Port was introduced in 1994 and has a ported 150 mm (6 in) barrel; the Model 686 Plus was introduced in 1996 and has a 64, 76, 102, or 152 mm (2.5, 3, 4, or 6 in) barrel, adjustable sights, 7-shot cylinder, and Hogue rubber grips. As with all current Smith & Wesson revolvers, the 686 Plus now has a key lock integral to the frame of the gun.

Variant	Caliber	Weight	Capacity	Year	Notes
S&W 686 Classic Hunter; 150 mm (6 in) barrel	.357 Magnum /; .38 Special	1.30 kg (45.8 oz)	6 rounds	1988	Unfluted cylinder
S&W 686-3 Midnight Black; 100 or 150 mm (4 or 6 in) barrel	.357 Magnum /; .38 Special	1.19 kg (42 oz)	6 rounds	1989	Black finish over stainless, 5000 produced
S&W 686; 64 mm (2.5 in) barrel	.357 Magnum /; .38 Special	1.15 kg (40.5 oz)	6 rounds	1988	
S&W 686; 100 mm (4 in) barrel	.357 Magnum /; .38 Special	1.19 kg (42 oz)	6 rounds	1988	
S&W 686; 150 mm (6 in) barrel	.357 Magnum /; .38 Special	1.30 kg (45.8 oz)	6 rounds	1988	
S&W 686; 211 mm (8.325 in) barrel	.357 Magnum /; .38 Special	1.37 kg (48.3 oz)	6 rounds	1988	
S&W 686 CS-1	.357 Magnum /; .38 Special	Unknown			Made for United States Customs Service
S&W 686 National Security; 76 mm (3 in) barrel	.357 Magnum /; .38 Special	1.17 kg (41.2 oz)	6 rounds	1992	Black finish
S&W 686 National Security; 100 mm (4 in) barrel	.357 Magnum /; .38 Special	1.19 kg (42 oz)	6 rounds	1992	Black finish
S&W 686 Target Champion; 150 mm (6 in) match-grade barrel	.357 Magnum /; .38 Special	1.31 kg (46.2 oz)	6 rounds	1992	Full lug
S&W 686 Power Port; 150 mm (6 in) ported barrel	.357 Magnum /; .38 Special	1.30 kg (46 oz)	6 rounds	1994	Ported
S&W 686P; 64 mm (2.5 in) barrel	.357 Magnum /; .38 Special	1.16 kg (41 oz)	7 rounds	1996	Lockable with key
S&W 686P; 100 mm (4 in) barrel	.357 Magnum /; .38 Special	1.20 kg (42.3 oz)	7 rounds	1996	Lockable with key
S&W 686P; 150 mm (6 in) barrel	.357 Magnum /; .38 Special	1.31 kg (46.2 oz)	7 rounds	1996	Lockable with key
S&W 686P; 130 mm (5 in) barrel	.357 Magnum /; .38 Special	1.15 kg (40.5 oz)	7 rounds	2004	Half-lug barrel, HiViz front sight
S&W 686 "The Presidents"; 150 mm (6 in) barrel	.357 Magnum /; .38 Special	1.31 kg (46.2 oz)	6 rounds	2003	Brushed gold finish with finger hardwood grips
S&W 686PP; 150 mm (6 in) barrel	.357 Magnum /; .38 Special	1.31 kg (46.2 oz)	6 rounds		Integral Compensator, lockable with key
S&W 686 Performance Center; 150 mm (6 in) barrel (weighted)	.357 Magnum /; .38 Special	1.50 kg (52.9 oz)	6 rounds	2007	Weighted barrel, Weaver/Picatinny rail on barrel, adjustable/removable weights, ball-bearing cylinder lock, forged hammer and trigger, traditional old school pinned sear, PC aluminum case or gun rug, lockable with key

== Engineering and production changes ==
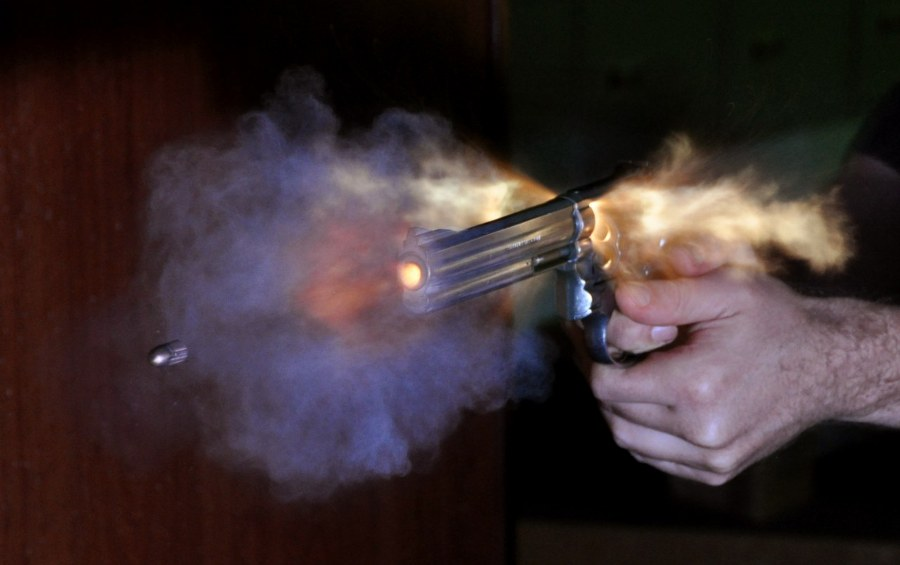
Photo of a Smith & Wesson 686 firing a .38 Special round, taken with an ultra high-speed flash (air-gap flash)

- 686 (no dash), 1981 Introduction model
- 686-1, 1986 radius stud package, floating hand
- 686-2, 1987 changed hammer nose, bushing and associated parts
- 686-3, 1988 new yoke retention system
- 686-4, 1993 change rear sight leaf, drill and tap frame, change extractor, Hogue grips
- 686-5, 1997 change frame design to eliminate cylinder stop stud, eliminate serrated tangs, MIM hammer and trigger, change internal lock.
- 686-6, 2001 internal lock
- 686-7, 2003 Performance Center .38 Super, 6-Shot unfluted cylinder, 4" barrel, Stainless Steel, 250 Made

== Gallery ==
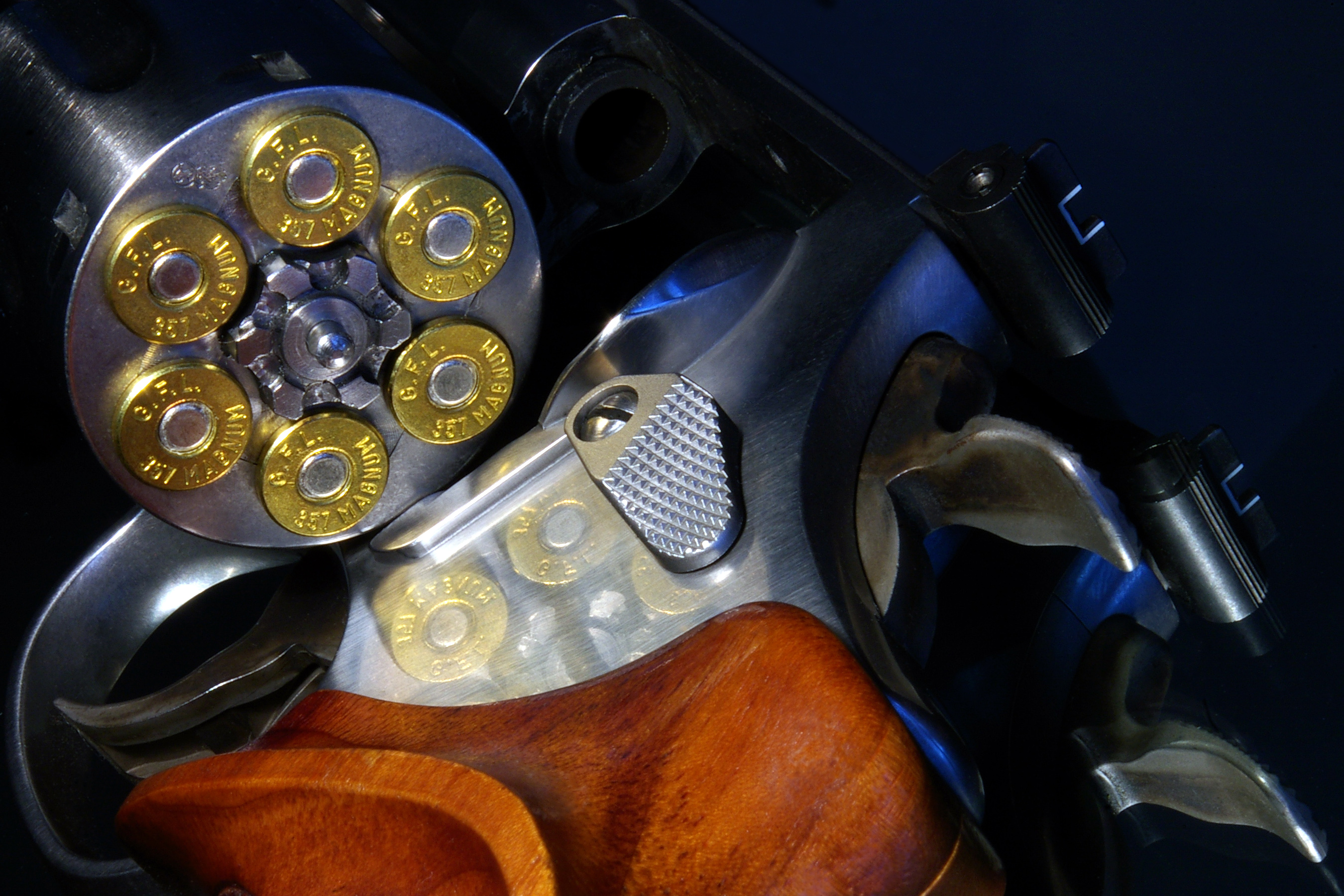

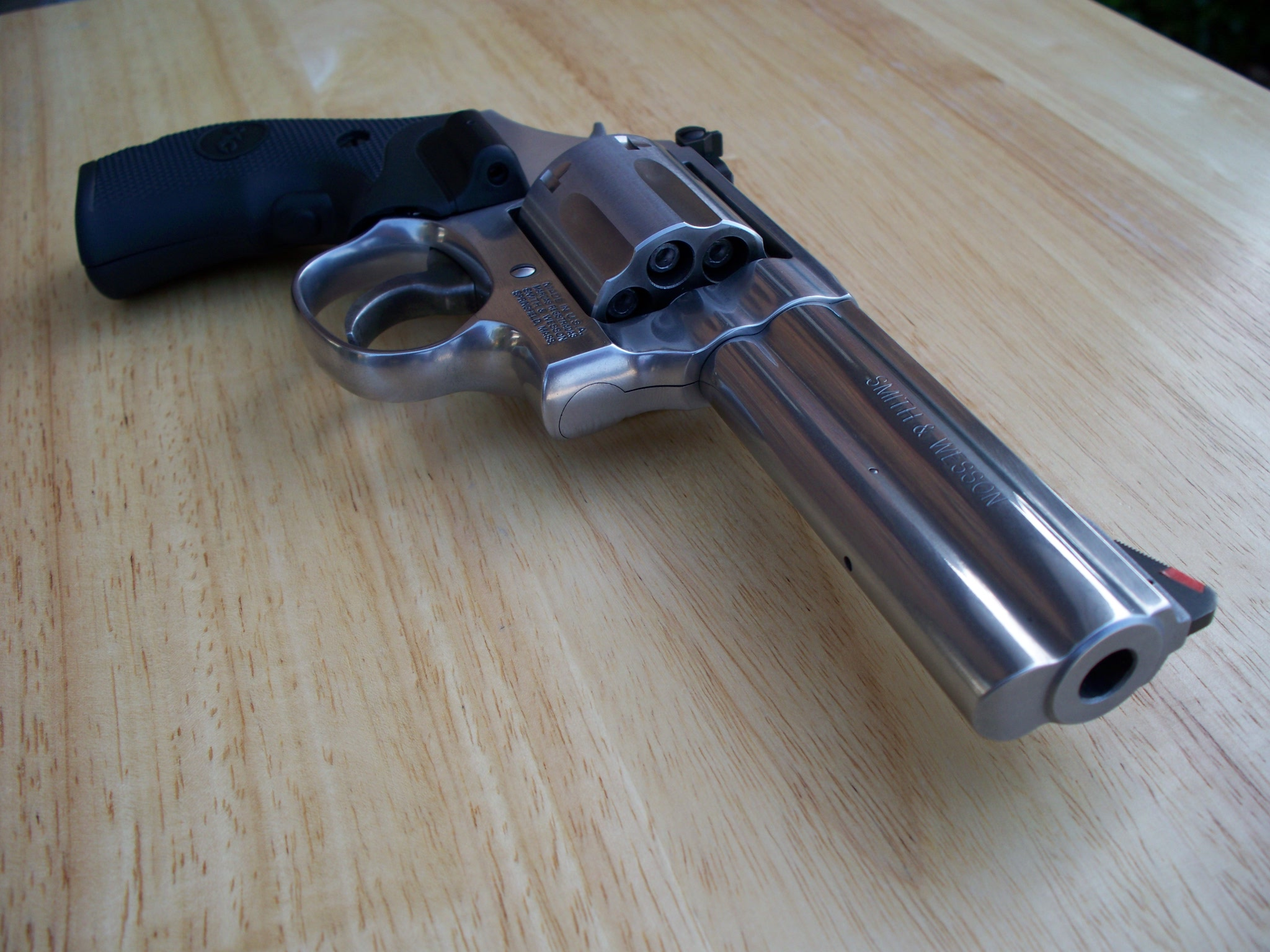

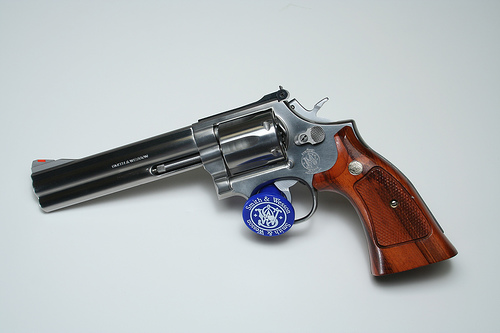

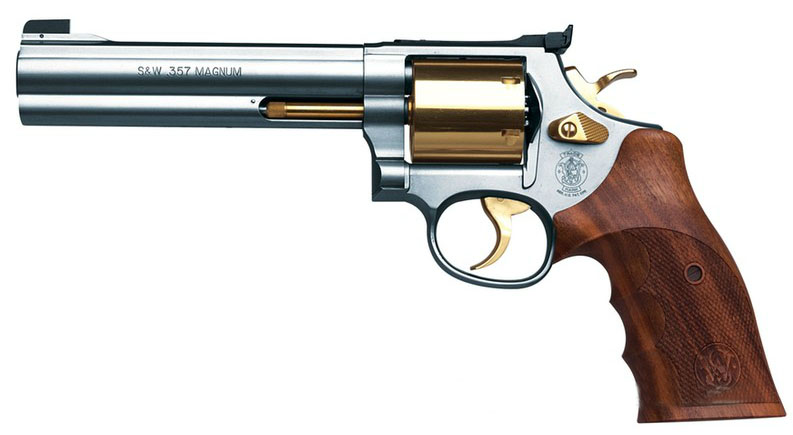

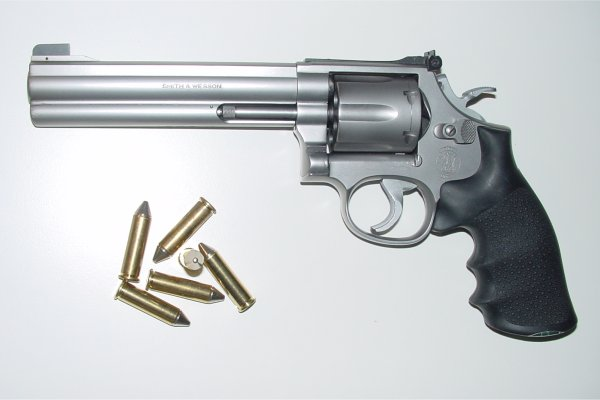

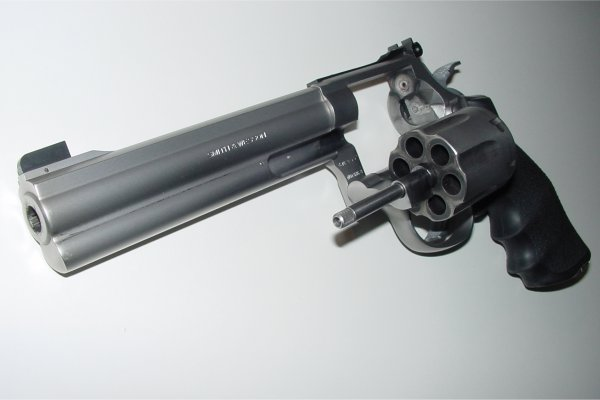

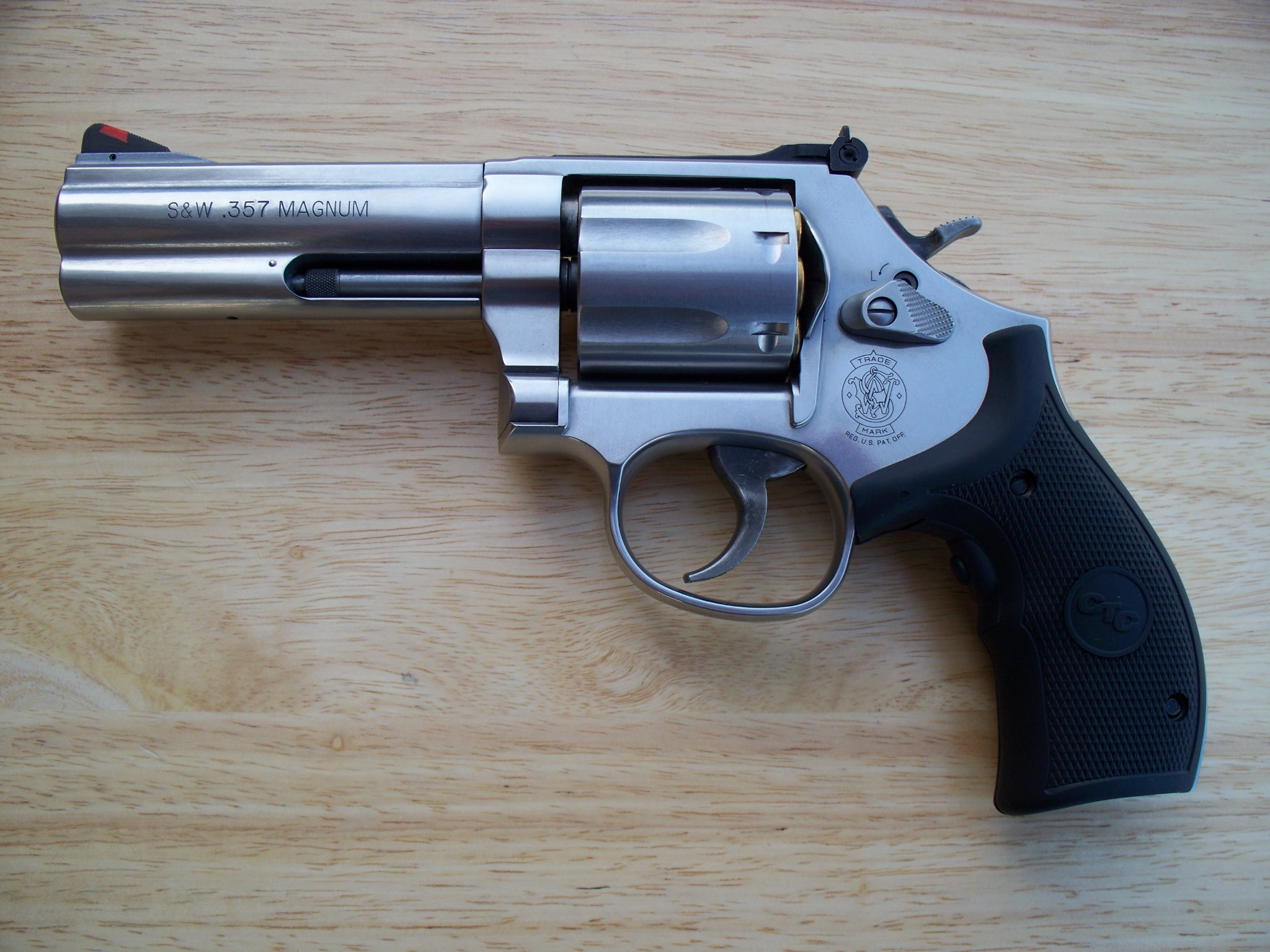

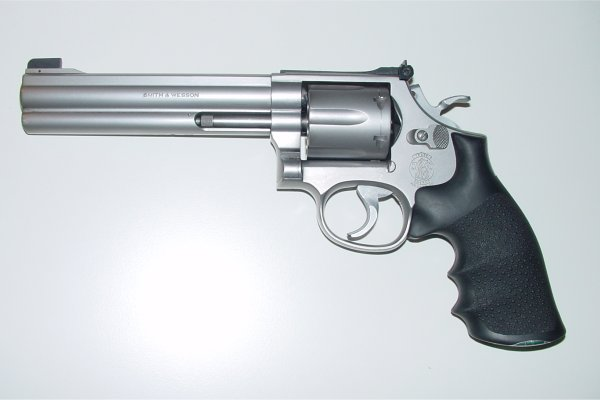

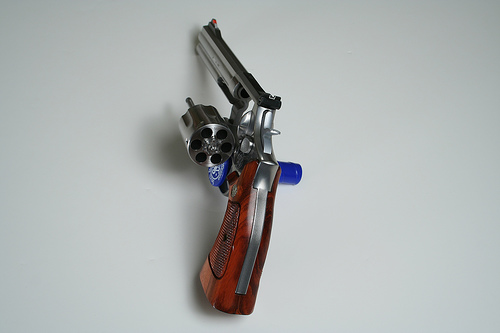

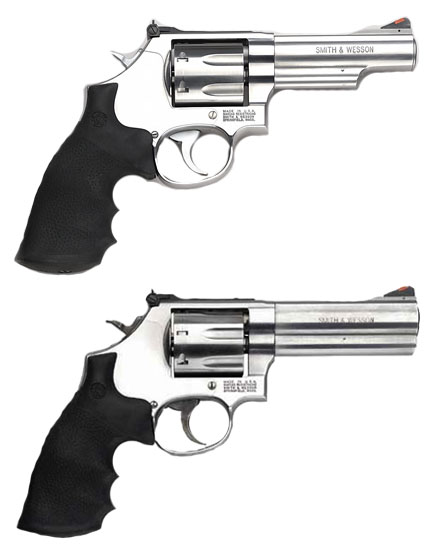

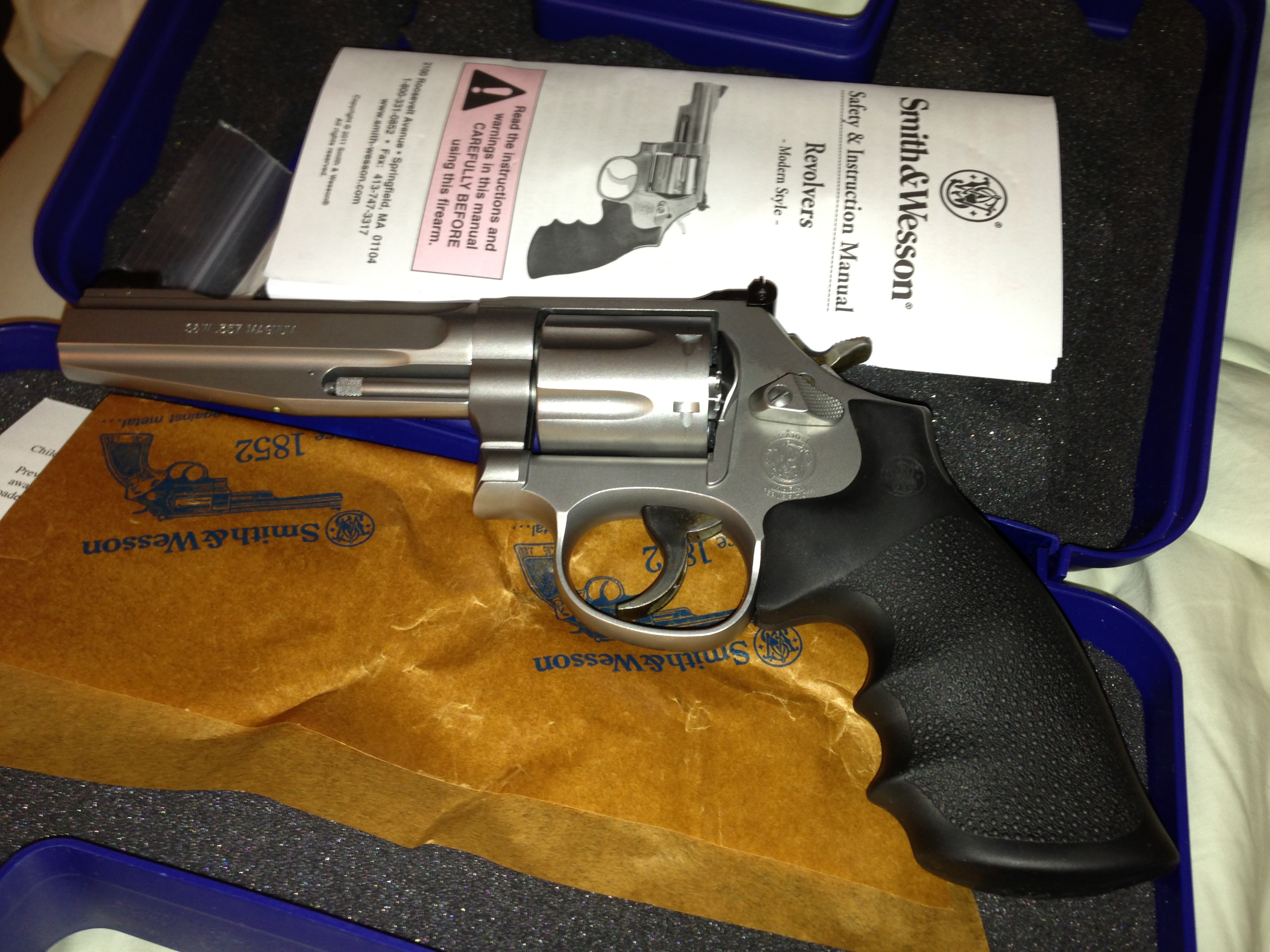

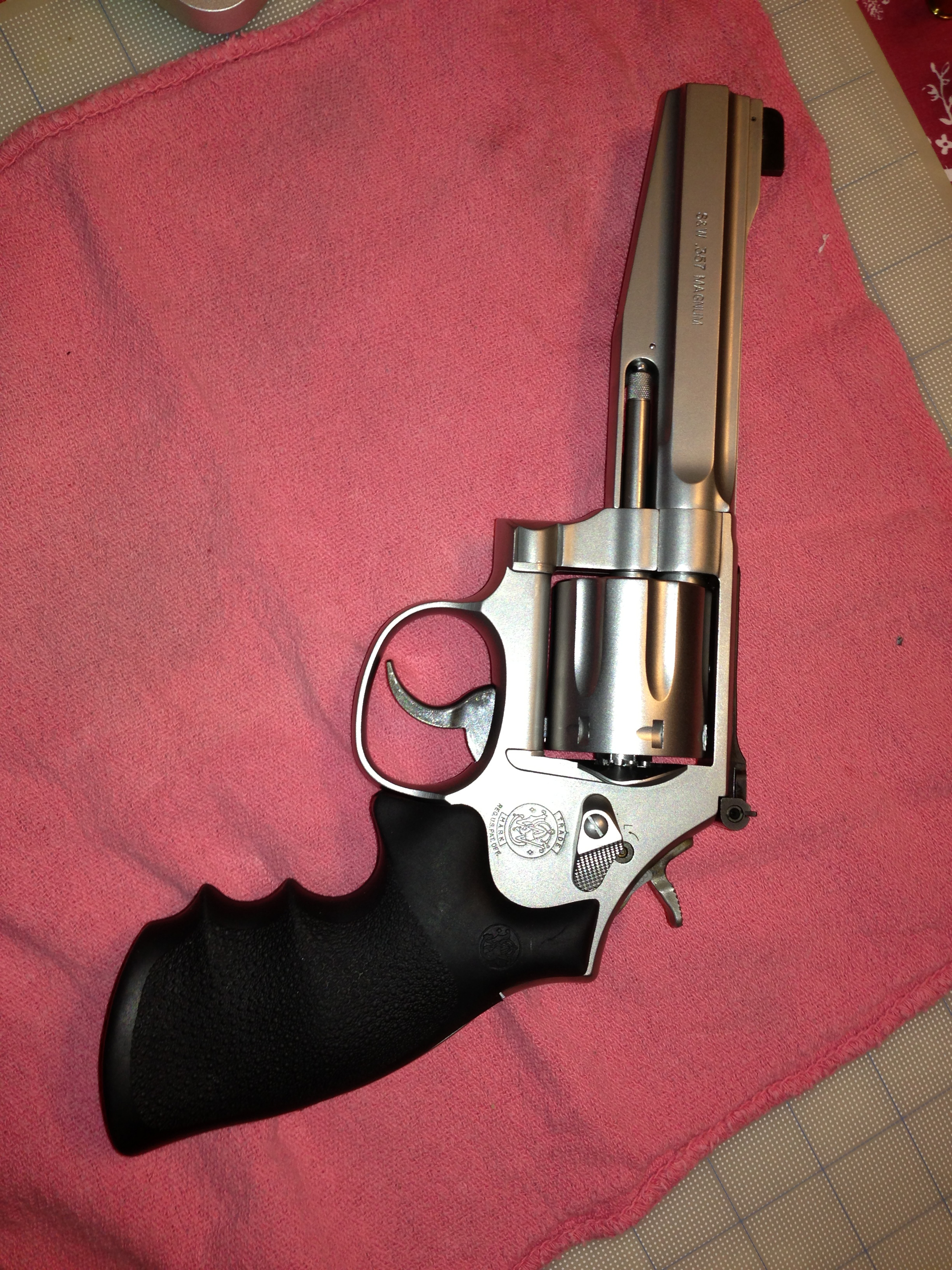

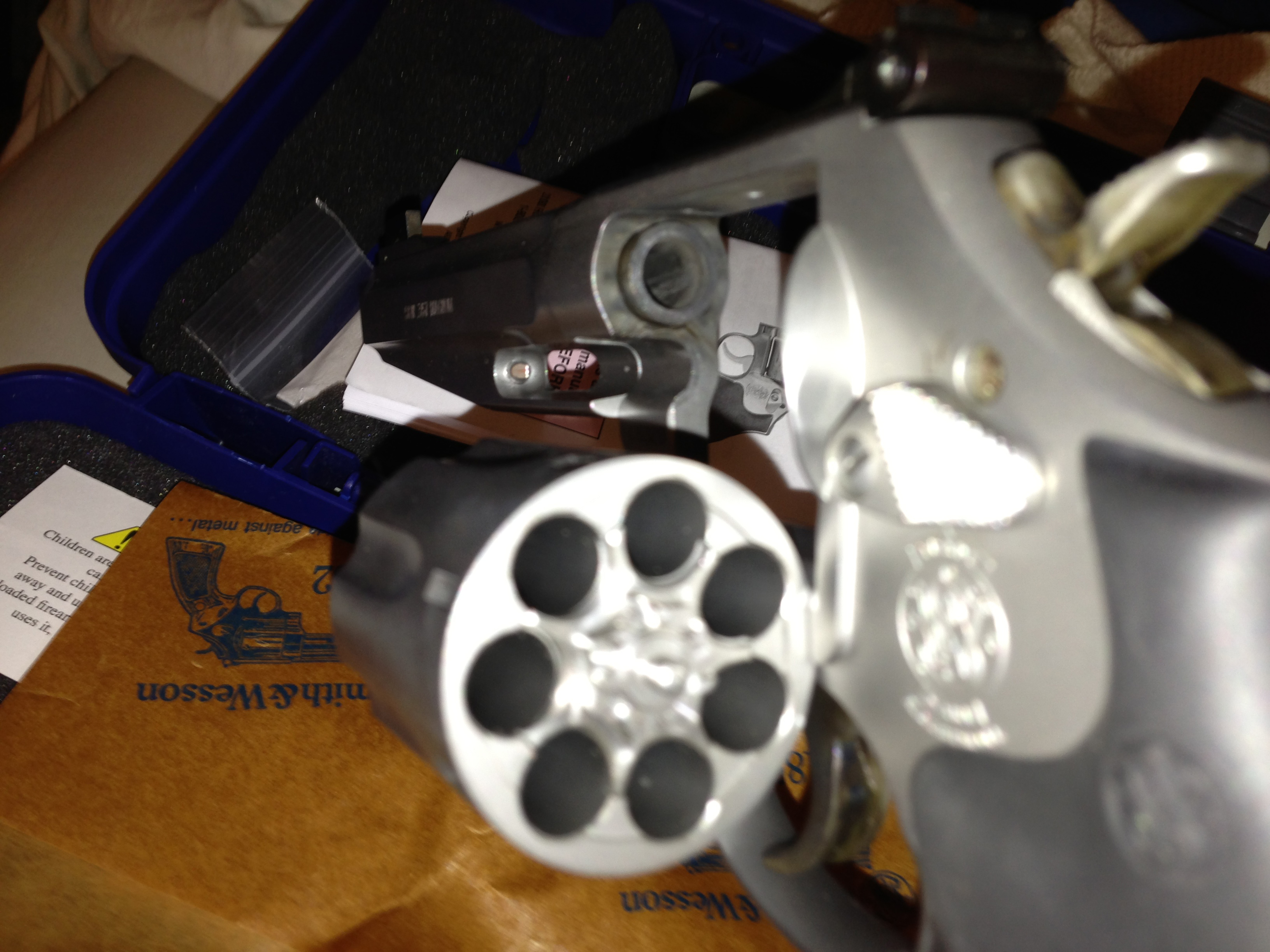

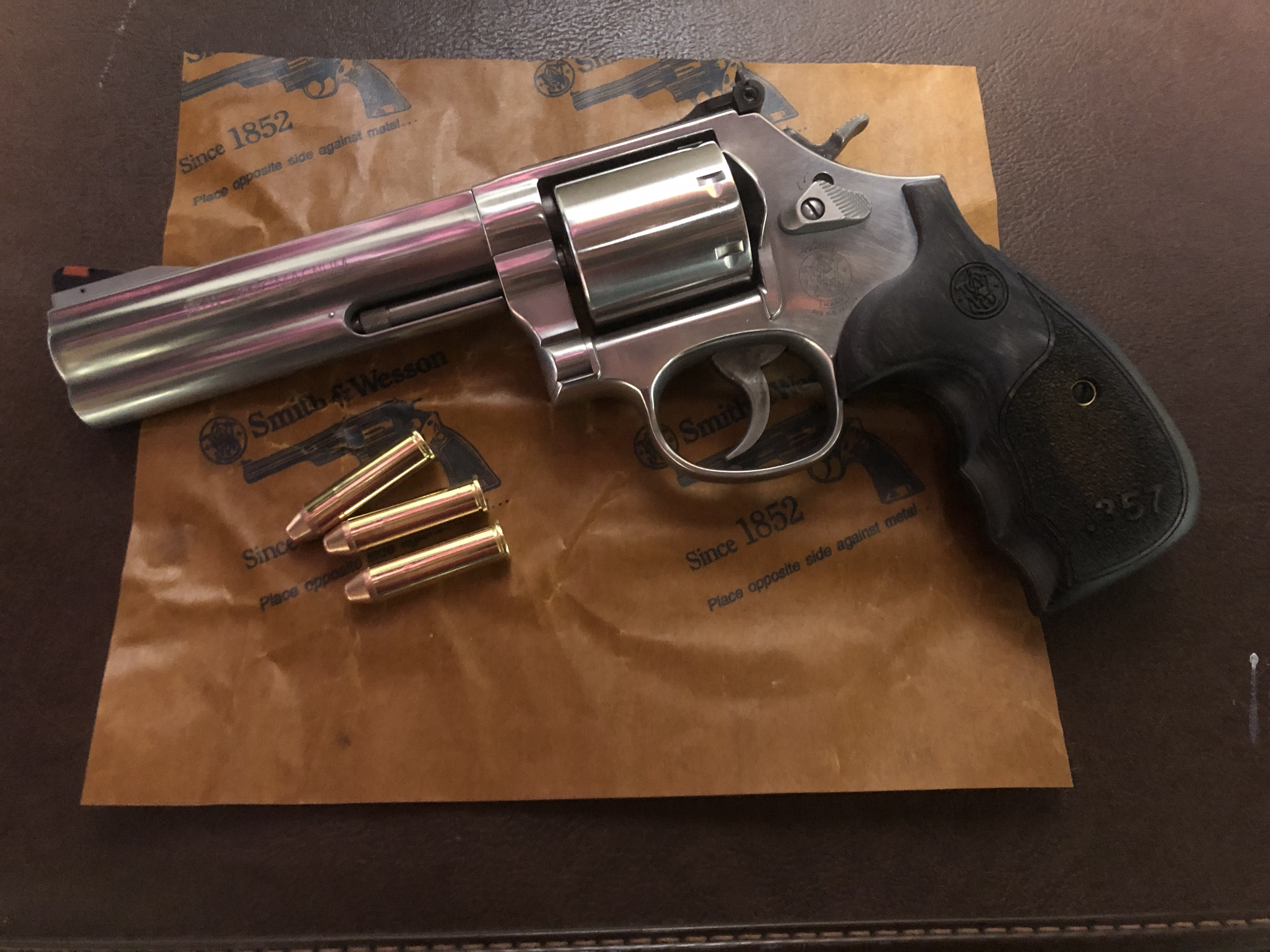

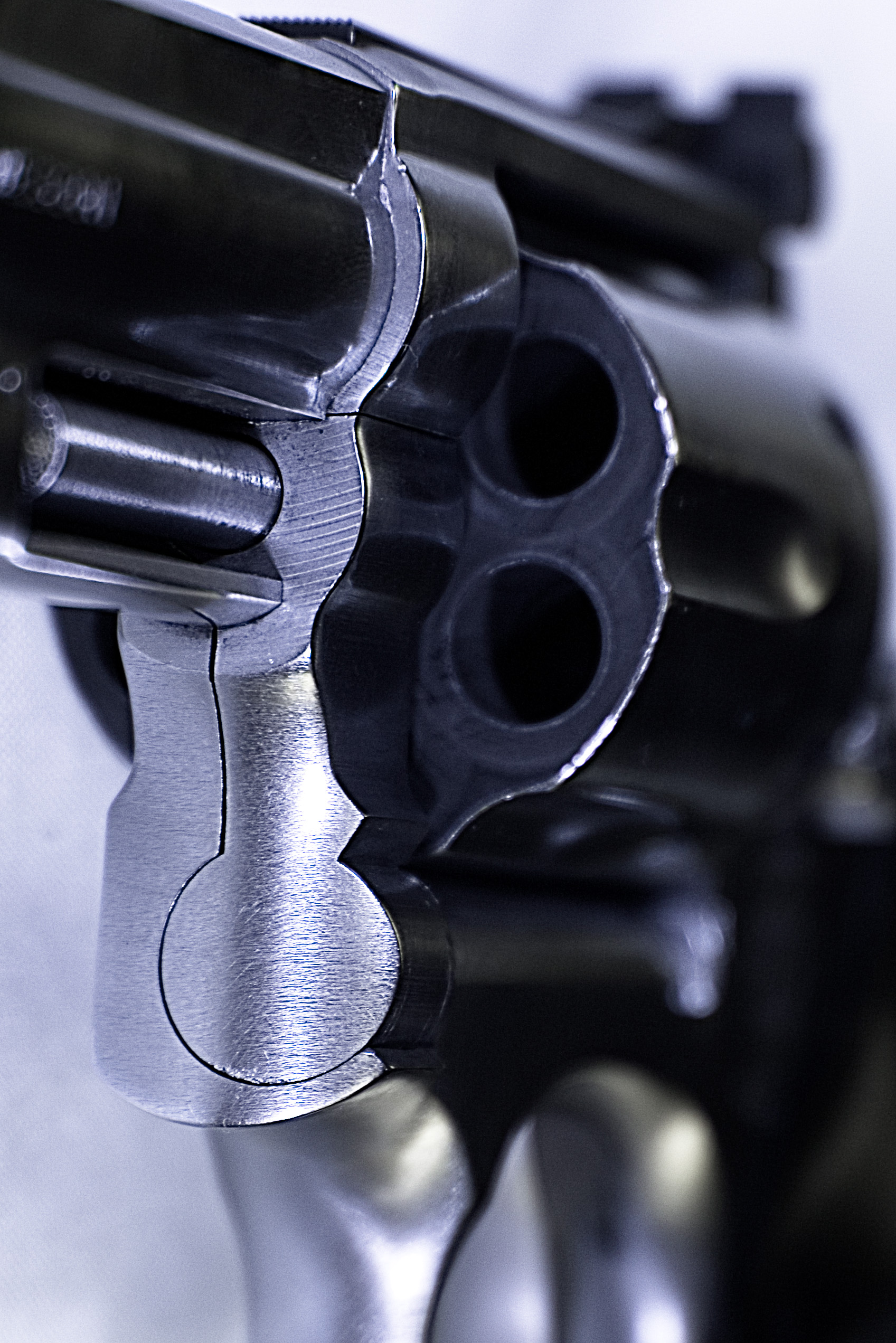

== Users ==
- France
  - GIGN during amphibious operations.
- Norway
  - The 3"-barreled version with gonçalo alves hardwood-grip was used as a sidearm in the alien immigrant-branches of the Norwegian Police Service by individual plainclothes officers during the early 1990s.
- United States
  - U.S. Border Patrol.
  - U.S. Customs Service.
  - Immigration and Naturalization Service
  - U.S. Navy SEALs during waterborne missions.
  - Federal Bureau of Investigation FBI agents carried personally owned S&W 686s along with other .357 magnum revolvers with supervisor approval. Notably carried by agents during the 1986 FBI Miami shootout.
  - Used by some smaller police departments and by individual officers in larger departments, especially in marine environments.
- Luxembourg
  - Grand Ducal Police as duty weapon from the 1980s through 2017 when it was replaced by the HK VP9.

== Recall ==
In 1987, seven years after the release of the Model 686, there were reports of cylinder binding with some types of standard .357 Magnum ammunition for L-frame revolvers manufactured before August 1987. S&W put out a product warning and authorized a no-charge upgrade to make modifications to the revolver. All recalled and reworked guns were stamped with an M marking, signifying that they had been recalled and fixed; thus it is known as the M modification for all 686, 686–1, 586–1, and 586-2 revolvers.
