= Smith & Wesson Model 586 =

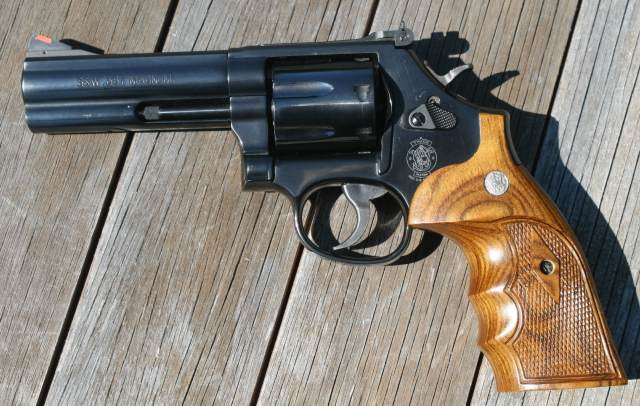
- 586-7 Revolver with 7-round capacity and factory wood grips and hammer lock
- Type: Revolver
- Place of origin: United States

Production history
- Manufacturer: Smith & Wesson
- Produced: 1981–1999; 2012–present
- Variants: 586-(1 through 8); 686 (stainless steel)

Specifications
- Cartridge: .357 Magnum.38 Special
- Action: Double action and single action
- Feed system: 6-round or 7-round cylinder
- Sights: Adjustable rear open sights

The Smith & Wesson Model 586 is a six- or seven-shot double-action revolver chambered for the .357 Magnum cartridge; it will also chamber and fire .38 Special cartridges. The Model 586 has a carbon steel construction and is available in a blued or nickel finish; it is essentially the same firearm as the Model 686, which has stainless steel construction. It is also known as the Distinguished Combat Magnum.

== Description ==
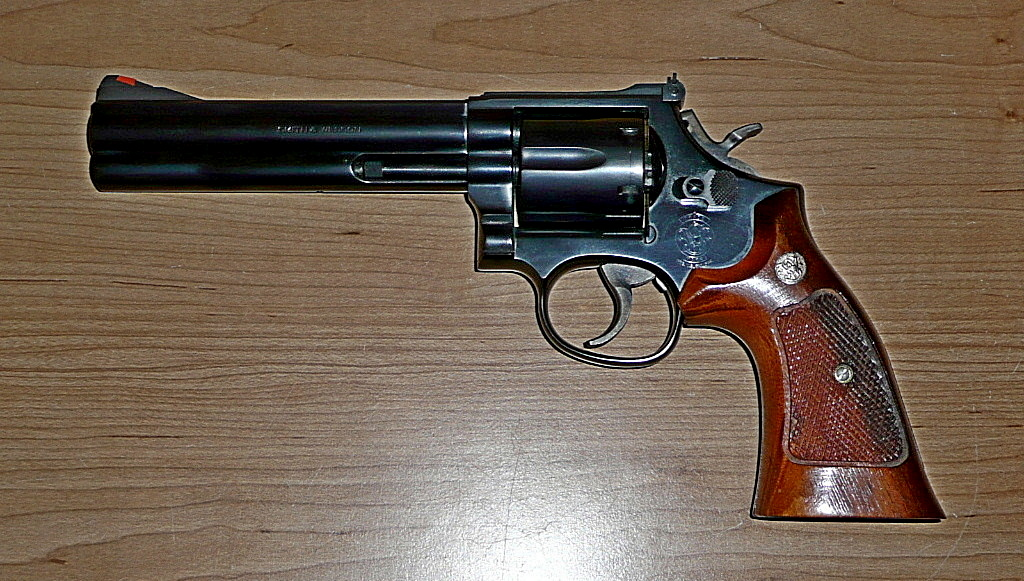
Smith & Wesson 586-1 with 6 inch barrel

In addition to being able to chamber and fire .357 Magnum cartridges, the 586 will chamber and fire .38 Special cartridges as well as .38 Special +P (overpressure ammunition). The 586 has been available with 2 1/2, 3, 4, 6, and 8 3/8 in (64, 76, 102, 153, and 214 mm) barrel lengths as standard models and other barrel lengths either by special order from S&W's Performance Center custom shop, or acquired from or built by after-market gunsmiths.

The Model 586 uses S&W's 'L' (medium) revolver frame, with a K-frame-sized grip mated to a larger diameter cylinder. During the 1980s, Smith & Wesson developed its L-frame line of .357 Magnums: the Smith & Wesson Model 581, Model 586, Smith & Wesson Model 681, and Model 686. The Model 581 had a fixed notch type rear sight, whereas the 586 used a target style adjustable rear sight. These handguns had a major effect on both law enforcement and sporting markets. The 586 was introduced in 1980, while the 581 was discontinued in 1988.

The K-frame guns, though popular with police departments, were felt to be too light for full-power .357 ammunition, and a heavier and more durable gun was desired, in the same frame size. (This would avoid the complaints attaching to the larger, heavier N-frame Model 29 and Model 58.) Designed with input from official S&W historian Roy Jinks, the L-frame was the result, and it quickly gained praise from policemen and hunters.

The 586 was discontinued in 1999. After a 13-year absence, it was reintroduced in 2012 with the aforementioned safety modifications, plus an improved yoke, as the 586-8 variant. These are produced with 4-inch (100 mm) and 6-inch (150 mm) barrel lengths, as part of Smith & Wesson's Classic line of revolvers.

Controversy rose when Smith & Wesson cooperated with the Clinton administration to modify their line of revolvers with an internal locking mechanism, colloquially dubbed the "Hillary Hole", and other changes. That agreement resulted in a boycott by many firearms enthusiasts, which led to a dramatic drop in stock price, and nearly bankrupted the company. Smith & Wesson was sold to Saf-T-Hammer for a fraction of its true value.

== Engineering and production changes ==
Model	Year	Modifications
586	1981	Introduction.
586-1	1986	Radius stud package, floating hand
586-M	1987	Product warning by S&W: M over stamped to signify a modification by factory or warranty station for 586 and 586-1
586-2	1987	Changed hammer nose, bushing and associated parts
586-3	1988	New yoke retention system
586-4	1993	Change rear sight leaf, drill and tap frame, change extractor, Hogue grips
586-5	1997	Delete 8 3/8" barrel/change to MIM thumbpiece/Ship with Master trigger locks
586-6	1997	Change frame design to eliminate cylinder stop stud, eliminate serrated tangs, MIM hammer and trigger, change to internal lock
586-6	1999	Model 586 Discontinued
586-7	2004	Seven shot with internal lock. Also Performance Center .38 Super, 6-Shot unfluted cylinder, 4 in (100 mm) barrel, Stainless Steel, 250 made.
586-8	2012	Reintroduction as a Classic Series with internal lock 6-shot 4" and 6" RR, WO TS SB

== Recall ==
In 1987, seven years after the release of the Model 686, there were reports of cylinder binding with some types of standard .357 Magnum ammunition for L-frame revolvers manufactured before August 1987. S&W published a product warning and authorized free modification to the revolver. All affected revolvers repaired for this recall were stamped with an M on the yoke near the model number. Thus it is known as the M modification for all 686, 686-1, 586, and 586-1 revolvers.
