= Smith & Wesson 459 =

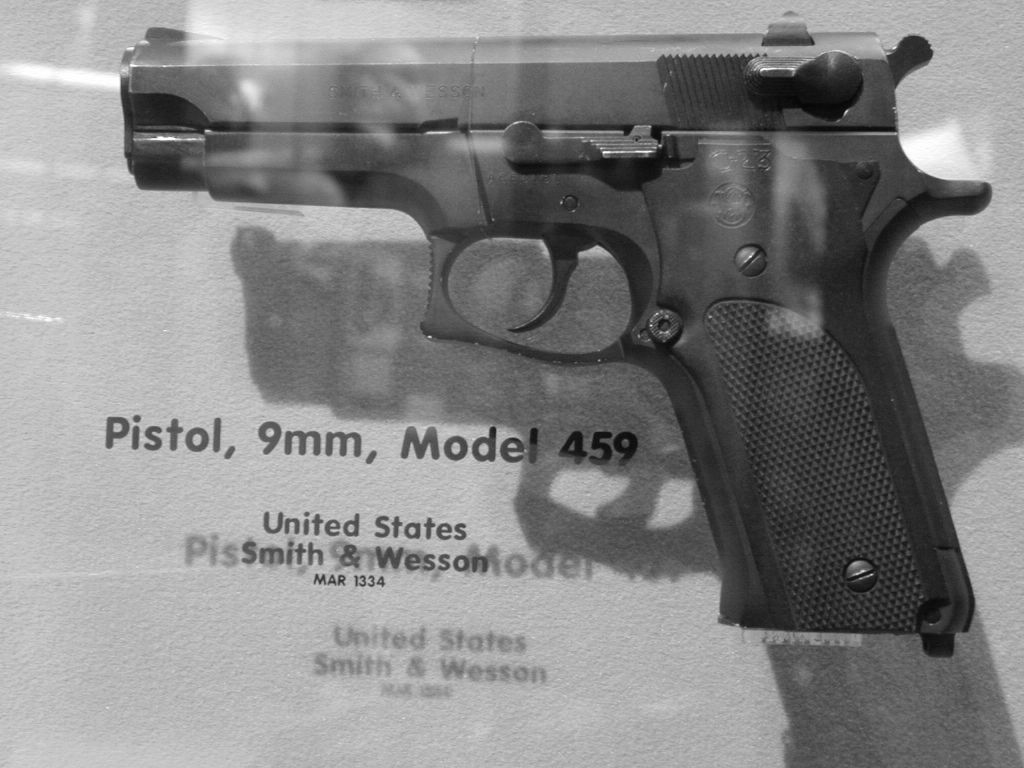
- A S&W 459 in the museum at Aberdeen Proving Ground, Aberdeen, MD
- Place of origin: United States

Production history
- Designer: Smith & Wesson
- Designed: 1984–1988
- Manufacturer: Smith & Wesson

Specifications
- Cartridge: 9 x 19mm Parabellum
- Action: Short recoil, locked breech
- Feed system: 14-round box magazine

The Smith & Wesson 459 is a 9mm double/single action pistol with locked breech short recoil action. It is an updated version of the Model 59 with adjustable sights and checkered nylon grips. The gun was created for the US XM9 Pistol trials.

This handgun did not complete the test and so was not considered. Testing procedures are discussed in the book Future Weapons. and also at Firearms Radio Network Handgun Radio XM9 Testing

This model was discontinued in 1988. 803 units were produced in a brush finish with special grips made to FBI specifications.

== Users ==
- United States
  - Federal Bureau of Investigation About 800 handguns issued to Agents.
