= 2022 IPSC Handgun World Shoot =

International shooting tournament

Coordinates: 12.8512°N 101.0364°E

- Venue: THPSA Shooting Range
- Location: Pattaya, Thailand
- Dates: Opening Ceremony: November 26; Main Match: November 27 - December 2 Shoot-Off: December 3 Awards: December 3
- Competitors: 1345 from 76 nations

Medalists
gold medal	Production (Largest Division) (France) Eric Grauffel
silver medal	(Argentina) German Romitelli
bronze medal	(Philippines) Aeron Jhon Lanuza

The 2022 IPSC Handgun World Shoot XIX was held in Thailand from November 27 to December 3. The match consisted of 30 stages over 5 areas, and the main-match sponsor was CZ firearms. The match had a capacity of 1600 competitors, and 1345 competitors from 73 countries completed. It was the first World Shoot featuring the popular Production Optics divisions, and was the nineteenth IPSC Handgun World Shoot.

== History ==
The championship was originally scheduled for 2020. Due to the COVID-19 pandemic, the match was initially postponed to November/December 2021, but due to the unpredictableness of the COVID situation, the match was finally postponed once more until 2022, coinciding with the completion of the kingdom's full reopening.

== Venue and climate ==
The match venue was at newly constructed the THPSA Shooting Range. The city of Pattaya is the resort capital of Thailand, and the shooting range is located about 30 km from the Pattaya Beach, which is one of Asia's largest beach resorts. The match was set to the end of November and start of December, which is the start of the cool season in Thailand which is relatively hot and dry, with expected daily mean temperatures around 26 °C and relative humidity around 70-75%.

== Results ==
=== Production ===
The Production division had the largest match participation with 341 shooters (25.4%). It was won by the frenchman Eric Grauffel who thereby took his eighth world championship title in the overall category. Reigning Production world champion Ben Stoeger did not compete in the championship.

Individual

Overall	Competitor	Points	Match percent	
Gold	(France) Eric Grauffel	2504.3244	100.00%	
Silver	(Argentina) German Romitelli	2387.2423	95.32%	
Bronze	(Philippines) Aeron Jhon Lanuza	2339.8913	93.43%	
4	(Czech Republic) Michal Stepan	2335.9179	93.28%	
5	(Italy) Valerio Passalia	2329.2379	93.01%	
6	(United States) Mason Lane	2294.5737	91.62%	
7	(Spain) Eduardo de Cobos Abreu	2277.0004	90.92%	
8	(Serbia) Ljubisa Momcilovic	2276.0266	90.88%	
9	(Italy) Francesco Perazzoli	2221.1044	88.69%	
10	(United States) Casey Reed	2219.6828	88.63%	
Lady	Competitor	Points	Category percent	Overall percent
Gold	(Italy) Camilla Almici	1788.8888	100.00%	71.43%
Silver	(France) Cyrielle Vivo	1781.8609	99.61%	71.15%
Bronze	(Italy) Chiara Neviani	1757.8724	98.27%	70.19%
Super Junior	Competitor	Points	Category percent	Overall percent
Gold	(Thailand) Peerawut Thamma	2012.1117	100.00%	80.35%
Silver	(Slovakia) Samuel Scepko	1971.1699	97.97%	78.71%
Bronze	(United Kingdom) Sasha Mikhailov	1794.5067	89.19%	71.66%
Junior	Competitor	Points	Category percent	Overall percent
Gold	(Philippines) Aeron Jhon Lanuza	2339.8913	100.00%	93.43%
Silver	(Argentina) Juan Pablo Duran	2165.2286	92.54%	86.46%
Bronze	(Australia) James Phegan	2103.0508	89.88%	83.98%
Senior	Competitor	Points	Category percent	Overall percent
Gold	(Serbia) Ljubisa Momcilovic	2276.0266	100.00%	90.88%
Silver	(Slovakia) Marian Vysny	1912.3368	84.02%	76.36%
Bronze	(Italy) Giovanni Zuccolo	1901.6018	83.55%	75.93%
Super Senior	Competitor	Points	Category percent	Overall percent
Gold	(Czech Republic) Zdenek Nemecek	1609.6033	100.00%	64.27%
Silver	(Israel) Michael Hollander Hacohen	1584.5369	98.44%	63.27%
Bronze	(Philippines) Arnel Ariate	1462.7085	90.87%	58.41%

=== Open ===
The Open division had the second largest match participation with 333 competitors (24.8%).

Individual

Overall	Competitor	Points	Match percent	
Gold	(United States) Christian Sailer	2474.3181	100.00%	
Silver	(Philippines) Edcel John Gino	2459.2095	99.39%	
Bronze	(United States) Chris Tilley	2430.2759	98.22%	
4	(United States) KC Eusebio	2424.0049	97.97%	
5	(Czech Republic) Robin Sebo	2390.3698	96.61%	
6	(Australia) Brodie McIntosh	2358.9903	95.34%	
7	(Australia) Scott Miller	2349.9507	94.97%	
8	(Brazil) Jaime Saldanha Jr	2338.0925	94.49%	
9	(France) Emile Obriot	2334.8425	94.36%	
10	(United States) John Vlieger	2308.7593	93.31%	
Lady	Competitor	Points	Category percent	Overall percent
Gold	(Indonesia) Sarah Ayu Tamaela	2026.1816	100.00%	81.89%
Silver	(United States) Jessie Harrison	1966.2889	97.04%	79.47%
Bronze	(Philippines) Jessica Tampoco	1914.7844	94.5%	77.39%
Super Junior	Competitor	Points	Category percent	Overall percent
Gold	(Thailand) Siraphob Hemmala	2080.6820	100.00%	84.09%
Silver	(Indonesia) Prabu Rakyan Raka Nalyandra	1915.3338	92.05%	77.41%
Bronze	(Philippines) Luisito Miguel de Guzman	1775.3399	85.32%	71.75%
Junior	Competitor	Points	Category percent	Overall percent
Gold	(Poland) Dawid Chojnowski	2271.3042	100.00%	91.80%
Silver	(Thailand) Veeravit Jarukiatpongsa	2168.0328	95.45%	87.62%
Bronze	(Poland) Adrian Samson	2160.6366	95.13%	87.32%
Senior	Competitor	Points	Category percent	Overall percent
Gold	(Finland) Raine Peltokoski	2242.701	100.00%	90.64%
Silver	(Australia) David Mcconachie	2135.6406	95.23%	86.31%
Bronze	(Australia) Gareth Graham	2121.8301	94.61%	85.75%
Super Senior	Competitor	Points	Category percent	Overall percent
Gold	(South Africa) Hubert Montgomery	1766.5852	100.00%	71.40%
Silver	(United States) William Paolino	1733.4523	98.12%	70.06%
Bronze	(Thailand) Vorapol Kulchairattana	1732.7148	98.08%	70.03%

=== Standard ===
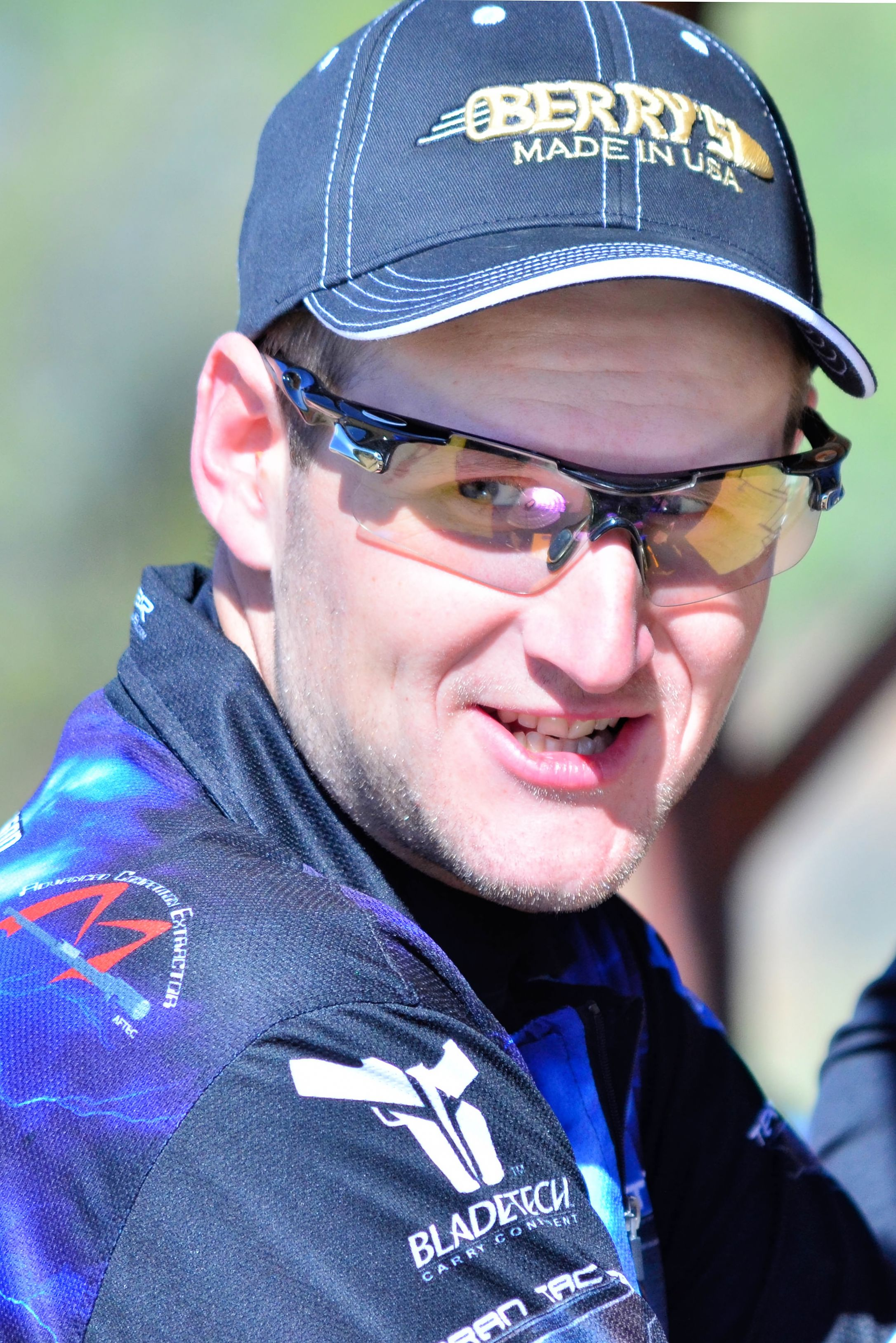
Nils Jonasson (USA) took the bronze medal in the Standard division.

The Standard division had the third largest match participation with 234 competitors (17.4%).

Individual

Overall	Competitor	Points	Match percent	
Gold	(Philippines) Kahlil Adrian Viray	2501.6773	100.00%	
Silver	(Philippines) Rolly Nathaniel Tecson	2446.0685	97.78%	
Bronze	(United States) Nils Jonasson	2366.3165	94.59%	
4	(Italy) Giacomo Bolzoni	2261.4417	90.40%	
5	(United States) Blake Miguez	2218.7082	88.69%	
6	(Philippines) Joseph Jr Bernabe	2178.9600	87.10%	
7	(Czech Republic) Zdenek Liehne	2169.1444	86.71%	
8	(Argentina) Gaston Quindi Vallerga	2070.4493	82.76%	
9	(Philippines) Akeem Adrian Viray	2067.2563	82.63%	
10	(Italy) Daniele Antoniotti	2054.1252	82.11%	
Lady	Competitor	Points	Category percent	Overall percent
Gold	(Philippines) Genesis Pible	1724.2112	100.00%	68.92%
Silver	(France) Margaux Nycz	1707.1964	99.01%	68.24%
Bronze	(Denmark) Sissal Skaale	1702.5649	98.74%	68.06%
Junior	Competitor	Points	Category percent	Overall percent
Gold	(Philippines) Kahlil Adrian Viray	2501.6773	100.00%	100.00%
Silver	(Philippines) Rolly Nathaniel Tecson	2446.0685	97.78%	97.78%
Bronze	(Philippines) Akeem Adrian Viray	2067.2563	82.63%	82.63%
Senior	Competitor	Points	Category percent	Overall percent
Gold	(Italy) Adriano Ciro Santarcangelo	1932.1893	100.00%	77.24%
Silver	(United States) Emanuel Bragg	1838.0207	95.13%	73.47%
Bronze	(Hungary) Ciesielski Marcin	1804.5459	93.39%	72.13%
Super Senior	Competitor	Points	Category percent	Overall percent
Gold	(Slovenia) Franci Zdesar	1575.7832	100.00%	62.99%
Silver	(Brazil) Lucimar Domingues de Oliveira	1570.9492	99.69%	62.80%
Bronze	(Philippines) Robert Po	1486.6154	94.34%	59.42%

=== Production Optics ===
The Production Optics division had the fourth largest match participation with 207 competitors (15.4%).

Individual

Overall	Competitor	Points	Match percent	
Gold	(United States) Simon Racaza	2527.2682	100.00%	
Silver	(Thailand) Pollc Hassana Wijitpatima	2455.6455	97.17%	
Bronze	(Czech Republic) Martin Kamenicek	2436.6844	96.42%	
4	(Thailand) Chanakit Kullanansiri	2383.3465	94.31%	
5	(Indonesia) Vincentius Djajadingrat	2315.2196	91.61%	
6	(Thailand) Kachen Jeakkhachorn	2259.9889	89.42%	
7	(Poland) Piotr Sienkiewicz	2253.8990	89.18%	
8	(Finland) Jani Kössi	2227.6266	88.14%	
9	(United States) Hwansik Kim	2223.1558	87.97%	
10	(Czech Republic) Miroslav Zapletal	2214.4303	87.62%	
Lady	Competitor	Points	Category percent	Overall percent
Gold	(United States) Morgan Leonhardt	1996.95	100.00%	79.02%
Silver	(Thailand) Chanyanuch Perkyam	1954.567	97.88%	77.34%
Bronze	(Sweden) Cecilia Lindberg	1899.158	95.10%	75.15%
Super Junior	Competitor	Points	Category percent	Overall percent
Gold	(Thailand) Tanut Ittisupornrat	1999.165	100.00%	79.10%
Silver	(Sweden) Hugo Rinaldo	1842.607	92.17%	72.91%
Bronze	(Thailand) Noppadon Namtapee	1763.39	88.21%	69.77%
Junior	Competitor	Points	Category percent	Overall percent
Gold	(Poland) Piotr Sienkiewicz	2253.899	100.00%	89.18%
Silver	(Indonesia) Khalil Gibran Harahap	2059.426	91.37%	81.49%
Bronze	(Thailand) Techawat Thongkham	2040.273	90.52%	80.73%
Senior	Competitor	Points	Category percent	Overall percent
Gold	(Philippines) Jerome Jovanne Morales	2174.331	100.00%	86.03%
Silver	(Thailand) Pathai Isarankura Na Ayudhya	2030.261	93.37%	80.33%
Bronze	(Italy) Fedele Dangiolillo	2022.458	93.02%	80.03%
Super Senior	Competitor	Points	Category percent	Overall percent
Gold	(Sweden) Stefan Ekstedt	1853.774	100.00%	73.35%
Silver	(Spain) Diego Cruz Menbrivez	1630.232	87.94%	64.51%
Bronze	(Germany) Rolf Dieter Reich	1623.753	87.59%	64.25%

=== Classic ===
The Classic division had the fifth largest match participation with 126 competitors (9.4%).

Individual

Overall	Competitor	Points	Match percent	
Gold	(Philippines) Jeufro Emil Lejano	2371.4653		
Silver	(Poland) Bartosz Szczesny	2359.6141		
Bronze	(Philippines) Alfredo Catalan Jr	2323.8105		
4	(Philippines) Lenard Lopez	2294.3301		
5	(Slovenia) Robert Cernigoj	2276.0380		
6	(Czech Republic) Jakub Marx	2250.7024		
7	(Philippines) Edrick Eliseo Chan	2244.3253		
8	(Philippines) Vincent Thomas R de Luzuriaga	2228.1846		
9	(Philippines) Jethro Dionisio	2188.0092		
10	(Thailand) Saditkorn Chomrit	2142.6356		
Lady	Competitor	Points	Category percent	Overall percent
Gold	(Thailand) Patcharin Innhom	1813.9972	100.00%	76.49%
Silver	(Philippines) Marly Martir	1689.0419	93.11%	71.22%
Bronze	(Thailand) Andrea Gail Calupig	1610.7503	88.80%	67.92%
Junior	Competitor	Points	Category percent	Overall percent
Gold	(Italy) Vincenzo Mundo	1892.9388	100.00%	79.82%
Silver	(Philippines) Carlos R de Luzuriaga	1869.2381	98.75%	78.82%
Bronze	(Australia) Jordan Vainer	1713.4048	90.52%	72.25%
Senior	Competitor	Points	Category percent	Overall percent
Gold	(Philippines) Jethro Dionisio	2188.0092	100.00%	92.26%
Silver	(New Zealand) Ramel Maligro	1816.1116	83.00%	76.58%
Bronze	(Philippines) James Quing	1805.1116	82.50%	76.12%
Super Senior	Competitor	Points	Category percent	Overall percent
Gold	(Italy) Marco Tiberi	1631.8772	100.00%	68.81%
Silver	(Canada) Anatoli Korobkin	1519.2874	93.10%	64.07%
Bronze	(Philippines) Alex Lao	1432.8944	87.81%	60.42%

=== Production Optics Light ===
The Production Optics Light division had the second smallest match participation with 58 competitors (4.3%).

Individual

Overall	Competitor	Points	Match percent	
Gold	(United States) Xuefeng Cao	2465.1320	100.00%	
Silver	(Thailand) Phiranat Tanpairoh	2433.0250	98.70%	
Bronze	(United States) Max Michel Jr	2364.5510	95.92%	
4	(United States) Joonkee Kim	2352.5260	95.43%	
5	(Brazil) Marcio Roberto Arendola	2299.0230	93.26%	
6	(Philippines) Paulo Paulino	2265.4530	91.90%	
7	(United States) Kevin Leonhardt	2234.2290	90.63%	
8	(Brazil) Thiago Henriques Ferreira	2205.4810	89.47%	
9	(United States) Matt Hopkins	2162.0290	87.70%	
10	(Slovakia) Ernest Nagy	2089.7810	84.77%	
Lady	Competitor	Points	Category percent	Overall percent
Gold	(Thailand) Nahathai Maleipan	1728.1250	100.00%	70.10%
Silver	(Hungary) Nikolett Hollosi	1460.4490	84.51%	59.24%
Bronze	(Philippines) Lydia Cuyong	1443.9340	83.55%	58.57%
Senior	Competitor	Points	Category percent	Overall percent
Gold	(Slovakia) Ernest Nagy	2089.7810	100.00%	84.77%
Silver	(Philippines) Johann Abanilla	1897.7820	90.81%	76.99%
Bronze	(Germany) Michael Schutz	1856.4410	88.83%	75.31%
Super Senior	Competitor	Points	Category percent	Overall percent
Gold	(Norway) Rune Vikeby	1709.0600	100.00%	69.33%
Silver	(Australia) David Owen	1644.5610	96.23%	66.71%
Bronze	(Brazil) Eurico Auler	1500.0720	87.77%	60.85%

=== Revolver ===
The Revolver division had the smallest match participation with 46 competitors (3.4%).

Individual

Overall	Competitor	Points	Match percent	
Gold	(Austria) Gerald Reiter	2482.3445	100.00%	
Silver	(Indonesia) Sonny Prabowo	2419.9655	97.49%	
Bronze	(Thailand) Kabin Susiwa	2407.8675	97.00%	
4	(Thailand) Siriroj Ploysutti	2350.6449	94.69%	
5	(Brazil) Moacir de Azevedo	2248.676	90.59%	
6	(Thailand) Siwa Khanti	2222.8087	89.54%	
7	(Thailand) Siri Poothong	2215.8257	89.26%	
8	(Thailand) Kanchit Ostasat	2190.5421	88.24%	
9	(Thailand) Norasaed Chatratthapong	2184.9563	88.02%	
10	(Philippines) Phillipp Chua	2180.3744	87.84%	
Lady	Competitor	Points	Category percent	Overall percent
Gold	(Thailand) Nicha Srinakarin	2025.7822	100.00%	81.61%
Silver	(Laos) Kongkham Bouasengphachanh	1763.3844	87.05%	71.04%
Bronze	(Thailand) Parichart Booranasri	1487.8717	73.45%	59.94%
Senior	Competitor	Points	Category percent	Overall percent
Gold	(Austria) Gerald Reiter	2482.3445	100.00%	100.00%
Silver	(Brazil) Moacir de Azevedo	2248.676	90.59%	90.59%
Bronze	(Thailand) Siri Poothong	2215.8257	89.26%	89.26%
Super Senior	Competitor	Points	Category percent	Overall percent
Gold	(United States) John Koppi	1924.2237	100.00%	77.52%
Silver	(Thailand) Tavesak Singsomboon	1757.9612	91.36%	70.82%
Bronze	(Netherlands) David Landeweer	1496.7145	77.78%	60.29%

== See also ==
- IPSC Rifle World Shoots
- IPSC Shotgun World Shoots
- IPSC Action Air World Shoot
