= 1999 IPSC Handgun World Shoot =

International shooting tournament

1999 IPSC Handgun World Shoot XII
- Official logo
- Location: Cebu, Philippines
- Dates: Sunday 31. October to Saturday 6. November 1999
- Competitors: 685 from 48 nations

Medalists
gold medal	Open (Largest Division) (France) Eric Grauffel
silver medal	(United States) Todd Jarrett
bronze medal	(Philippines) Jethro Dionisio

The 1999 IPSC Handgun World Shoot XII held in Cebu, Philippines was the 12th IPSC Handgun World Shoot. Eric Grauffel of France became Open World Champion, Pavel Jasansky of the Czech Republic became Modified World Champion and Michael Voigt of the United States took the Standard World Champion title.

== Champions ==
=== Open ===
The Open division had the largest match participation with 362 competitors (52.8 %).

Individual

Overall	Competitor	Points	Overall Match Percent	
Gold	(France) Eric Grauffel	1882.1396	100.00%	
Silver	(United States) Todd Jarrett	1813.7624	96.37%	
Bronze	(Philippines) Jethro Dionisio	1784.1558	94.79%	
4th	(United States) Jerry Barnhart	1759.6352	93.49%	
5th	(Spain) Angus Hobdell	1744.1951	92.67%	
6th	(Philippines) Jeufro Lejano	1719.1204	91.34%	
7th	(Australia) Errol Thomas	1718.7439	91.32%	
8th	(Philippines) Patrick Marvin Sanchez	1716.0989	91.18%	
9th	(United States) Rob Leatham	1704.5984	90.57%	
10th	(Spain) Eduardo de Cobos	1689.6534	89.77%	
Lady	Competitor	Points	Overall percent	Category percent
Gold	(Philippines) Athena Lee	1451.8350	77.14%	100.00%
Silver	(Philippines) Mary Grace Tan	1430.2978	75.99%	98.52%
Bronze	(South Africa) Chantal Tam	1366.3836	72.60%	94.11%
Junior	Competitor	Points	Overall percent	Category percent
Gold	(France) Eric Grauffel	1882.1396	100.00%	100.00%
Silver	(United States) Max Michel	1627.3877	86.46%	86.46%
Bronze	(Philippines) Stephen Hinojales	1607.9078	85.43%	85.43%
Senior	Competitor	Points	Overall percent	Category percent
Gold	(United States) Allan Zitta	1357.1082	72.10%	100.00%
Silver	(United States) Joe de Simone	1342.3222	71.32%	98.91%
Bronze	(France) Alain Tarrade	1324.2151	70.36%	97.58%
Super Senior	Competitor	Points	Overall percent	Category percent
Gold	(United States) Matt Burkett	1473.5364	78.29%	100.00%
Silver	(South Africa) Pierre Wrogemann	1392.6749	73.99%	94.51%
Bronze	(Philippines) Jomini Abaya	1337.9344	71.09%	90.80%

Teams

Overall	Country	Points	Percent	Team members
Gold	Philippines	5219.3751	100.00%	Jethro Dionisio, Jeufro Lejano, Patrick Marvin Sanchez, Jerome Morales
Silver	United States	5161.1184	98.88%	Todd Jarrett, Robert Leatham, Tawn Argeris, Jose Claudio Vidanes
Bronze	Australia	4695.3288	89.95%	Errol Thomas, Brodie McIntosh, Alan Shortall, Ivan Rehlichi
Lady	Country	Points	Percent	Team members
Gold	Philippines	4161.7827	100.00%	Athena Lee, Mary Grace Tan, Jannete Gonzaga, Jean Eeguerra
Silver	United States	3901.8905	93.75%	Sheila Brey, Kay Clark-Miculek, Sharon Edington, Kim Stroud
Bronze	South Africa	3790.8765	91.08%	Chantal Tam, Leani Henn, Susan van der Walt, Hanlie Montgomery

=== Modified ===
The Modified division had the third largest match participation with 74 competitors (10.8 %).

Individual

Overall	Competitor	Points	Overall Match Percent	
Gold	(Czech Republic) Pavel Jasansky	1809.1244	100.00%	
Silver	(Philippines) Enrico Papa	1723.8575	95.29%	
Bronze	(Philippines) Luis Lee	1684.9701	93.14%	
4th	(Philippines) Roland Tan	1673.1054	92.48%	
5th	(Italy) Roberto Vezzoli	1667.0658	92.15%	
6th	(Brazil) Hugo Ribeiro	1646.0779	90.99%	
7th	(Philippines) Rosendo Castro	1645.8096	90.97%	
8th	(Czech Republic) Jiri Lelic	1629.7845	90.09%	
9th	(Philippines) Efren Legaspi	1607.4676	88.85%	
10th	(Philippines) Gilbert Ng	1596.1552	88.23%	
Senior	Competitor	Points	Overall percent	Category percent
Gold	(Spain) Rawas Kheir Holo	1250.1574	69.10%	100.00%
Silver	(Italy) Vladimiro Montagni	944.1943	52.19%	75.53%
Bronze	(Czech Republic) Milan Trkulja	805.6085	44.53%	64.44%

Teams

Overall	Country	Points	Percent	Team members
Gold	Philippines	5081.9330	100.00%	Enrico Papa, Luis Lee, Roland Tan, Efren Legaspi
Silver	Czech Republic	4952.6326	97.45%	Pavel Jasansky, Jiri Lelic, Zdenek Nemecek, Josef Rakusan
Bronze	Italy	4537.6268	89.28%	Mario Rillo, Giorgio Patria, Gavino Mura, Piero Gasparini

=== Standard ===
The Standard division had the second largest match participation with 249 competitors (36.4 %).

Individual

Overall	Competitor	Points	Overall Match Percent	
Gold	(United States) Michael Voigt	1771.0359	100.00%	
Silver	(United States) Frank William Garcia	1763.0764	99.55%	
Bronze	(Italy) Adriano Santarcangelo	1742.5546	98.39%	
4th	(Guatemala) Estuardo Gomez	1696.4309	95.79%	
5th	(Sweden) Robert Söderström	1669.5510	94.27%	
6th	(United States) Angelo Spagnoli	1665.8707	94.06%	
7th	(Philippines) Daniel Torrevillas	1657.8931	93.61%	
8th	(South Africa) Nick du Plessis	1644.8322	92.87%	
9th	(United States) Brian Enos	1641.3754	92.68%	
10th	(Italy) Esterino Magli	1633.4055	92.23%	
Lady	Competitor	Points	Overall percent	Category percent
Gold	(United States) Debbie Keehart Ross	1011.9222	57.14%	100.00%
Silver	(Italy) Roberta Gardelli	1004.6202	56.73%	99.28%
Bronze	(Germany) Smed Raija	876.3737	49.48%	86.60%
Senior	Competitor	Points	Overall percent	Category percent
Gold	(Germany) Max Wiegand	1550.4150	87.54%	100.00%
Silver	(Philippines) Robert Kahler	1268.3859	71.62%	81.81%
Bronze	(Argentina) Roberto Casavecchia	1103.5595	62.31%	71.18%

Teams

Overall	Country	Points	Percent	Team members
Gold	United States	5199.9830	100.00%	Michael Voigt, Frank William Garcia, Angelo Spagnoli, Brian Enos
Silver	Italy	5000.3143	96.16%	Adriano Santarcangelo, Esterino Magli, Valter Tranquilli, Edoardo Buticchi
Bronze	South Africa	4744.6518	91.24%	Nick du Plessis, Deon de Lange, Colin Amm

== See also ==
- IPSC Rifle World Shoots
- IPSC Shotgun World Shoot
- IPSC Action Air World Shoot
