= 1996 IPSC Handgun World Shoot =

International shooting tournament

1996 IPSC Handgun World Shoot XI
- Official logo of the 1996 IPSC Handgun World Shoot
- Location: Brazilian Army Barracks, Brasília, Brazil
- Dates: 6 to 12 October 1996
- Competitors: 609

Medalists
gold medal	Open (Largest Division) (United States) Todd Jarrett
silver medal	(United States) Jerry Barnhart
bronze medal	(United States) Rob Leatham

The 1996 IPSC Handgun World Shoot XI held in Brazilian Army Barracks, Brasília, Brazil was the 11th IPSC Handgun World Shoot. The event had 609 competitors, teams from 31 nations and consisted of 35 stages. The Open division was won by Todd Jarrett, while the Standard division once again was won by Ted Bonnet of USA. Todd Jarret from Virginia had established himself as a major player before the event, having placed in the top four of the US Nationals every year since 1990 except one. According to himself he had trained well before the World Shoot in Brazil, and was quoted saying "It's really amazing, the harder I work, the luckier I get."

== Rulebook used ==
The 12th edition of the Rules of International Practical Shooting Confederation was used under the championship and one of the major changes compared to the current rules are the team rules where national team consisted of a maximum of six members. Ladies teams consisted of a maximum four members.

== Champions ==
=== Open ===
The Open division had the largest match participation with 398 competitors (65.4 %),

Individual

Overall	Competitor	Points	Overall Match Percent	
Gold	(United States) Todd Jarrett	1894.6349	100.00%	
Silver	(United States) Jerry Barnhart	1875.2104	98.97%	
Bronze	(United States) Rob Leatham	1865.8339	98.48%	
4th	(Australia) Errol Ron Thomas	1840.6546	97.15%	
5th	(Philippines) Jethro Dionisio	1828.8244	96.53%	
6th	(United States) Merle Edington	1785.9386	94.26%	
7th	(United States) Douglas Koenig	1774.1573	93.64%	
8th	(Australia) Craig Lawrence Ginger	1768.2249	93.33%	
9th	(United States) Jose Claudio Vidanes	1766.0796	93.21%	
10th	(United Kingdom) Angus Hobdell	1756.6531	92.72%	
Lady	Competitor	Points	Overall percent	Category percent
Gold	(United States) Kay Clark-Miculek	1414.9287	74.68%	100.00%
Silver	(Philippines) Mary Tan	1382.6770	72.98%	97.72%
Bronze	(South Africa) Chantal Accone	1371.5408	72.39%	96.93%
Junior	Competitor	Points	Overall percent	Category percent
Gold	(Philippines) Jeufro Lejano	1734.7564	91.56%	100.00%
Silver	(France) Eric Grauffel	1672.5632	88.28%	96.41%
Bronze	(Philippines) Roger Dy	1534.9023	81.01%	88.48%
Senior	Competitor	Points	Overall percent	Category percent
Gold	(United States) Allan Zitta	1427.2141	75.33%	100.00%
Silver	(South Africa) Paul Bromfield	1287.9867	85.90%	90.24%
Bronze	(United Kingdom) Martyn Speirs	1276.6696	67.38%	89.45%

Teams

Overall	Country	Points	Percent	Team members
Gold	United States	9175.9161	100.00%	Todd Jarrett, Jerry Barnhart, Rob Leatham, Douglas Koenig, Jose Claudio Vidanes and Tawn Argeris
Silver	Australia	8459.2113	92,18%	Errol Ron Thomas, Craig Lawrence Ginger, Ross Gregory Newell, Brodie McIntosh, Damien John Fitzgerald and Alan Shortall
Bronze	Philippines	8432.5657	91,89%	Jethro Dionisio, Jeufro Lejano, Jomini Manuel Abaya, Lyndon Biraogo, Jerome Morales and Daniel Torrevillas
Lady	Country	Points	Percent	Team members
Gold	United States	4146.3159	100%	Kay Clark-Miculek, Sheila Brey, Kippi Boykin and Sharon Edington
Silver	Philippines	3978.0670	95,94%	Mary Tan, Athena Lee, Valerie Levanza and Catherine Levanza
Bronze	Australia	3887.5448	93,75%	Robyn Joyce Estreich, Susan Patricia Ballantyne, Michelele Noe. Knee and Bonny Thomas

=== Modified ===
The Modified division had 11 competitors.

Individual

Overall	Competitor	Points	Overall Match Percent
Gold	(United States) Fred Craig	1407.3898	100.00%
Silver	(Philippines) Richard Daniel Kahler	1363.0039	96.85%
Bronze	(Philippines) Richard Kahler	1147.3321	81.52%
4th	(United Kingdom) Robert Chittleborough	1102.6358	78.35%
5th	(Brazil) Maria Jos	1083.6267	77.00%
6th	(Germany) Jorg Haben	978.5173	69.53%
7th	(United States) Kerby C. Smith	975.1011	69.28%
8th	(Brazil) Zenaldo Feuser	875.6240	62.22%
9th	(Germany) Klaus-Dieter Broesche	829.7651	58.96%
10th	(Cambodia) Thomas Bovet	713.1019	50.67%

=== Standard ===
The Standard division had the second largest match participation with 200 competitors (32.8 %),

Individual

Overall	Competitor	Points	Overall Match Percent	
Gold	(United States) Ted Bonnet	1499.3586	100.00%	
Silver	(United States) Frank Garcia	1489.1114	99.32%	
Bronze	(United States) Jay Christy	1466.9173	97.84%	
4th	(United States) Ron Avery	1460.2712	97.39%	
5th	(United States) James L. Wall	1433.7340	95.62%	
6th	(United States) Bruce E. Gray	1418.4954	94.61%	
7th	(United States) Larry L. Brown	1415.1323	94.38%	
8th	(United States) Armando Valdes	1412.2623	94.19%	
9th	(United States) Larry Steuerwald	1403.0543	93.58%	
10th	(South Africa) Gustave De Blanche	1372.2191	91.52%	
Senior	Competitor	Points	Overall percent	Category percent
Gold	(South Africa) Paul R. Bromfield	1287.9867	85,90%	100.00%
Silver	(Germany) Max Wiegand	1253.6723	83,61%	97.34%
Bronze	(United States) Salim S. Dominguez	1152.1968	76,84%	89.46%

Teams

Overall	Country	Points	Percent	Team members
Gold	United States	7202.9579	100.00%	Ted Bonnet, Harold Christy, Bruce E. Gray, Larry L. Brown, Larry Steuerwald and Brian Enos
Silver	South Africa	6604.6457	91,69%	Gustave De Blanche, Eugene B. Lurie, Sean Michael O'Donovan, Jonathan M. Fouche, Paul R. Bromfield and Clint Rafferty
Bronze	Brazil	6311.2515	87,62%	Hugo R. Ribeiro, Vitor Matos, Nilton A. Fior, Luiz (Tatai) Horta, Eduardo Lartigau, Iwar Mattos Jr.

== See also ==
- IPSC Rifle World Shoots
- IPSC Shotgun World Shoot
- IPSC Action Air World Shoot
