= 1977 IPSC Handgun World Shoot =

International shooting tournament

1977 IPSC Handgun World Shoot III
- Location: Salisbury, Rhodesia (now Zimbabwe)

Medalists
gold medal	(Rhodesia) David Westerhout
silver medal	(Rhodesia) Peter Maunder
bronze medal	(United States) Raul Walters

The 1977 IPSC Handgun World Shoot III was held in Salisbury, Rhodesia (now Zimbabwe) at the end of August, and was the third IPSC Handgun World Shoot, and was won by Dave Westerhout in front of his Rhodesian teammate and second-place winner Peter Maunder by 116.403 points and third-place winner Raul Walters of United States with further 41.741 points.

After the World Shoot, Westerhout was also honoured as the Rhodesian Sportsman of the Year for 1977 and was awarded the John Hopley Memorial Trophy.

Up till 1977 the World Shoots had been held once a year, but subsequent championships were to be held once every two years.

== Equipment ==
Dave Westerhout shot minor power factor using a double stack Browning Hi-Power in 9×19mm equipped with an aluminum Bomar sight rib and a stock 13 round capacity. Silver winner Peter Maunder of Rhodesia also shot 9×19mm minor using a Hi-power, while bronze winner Raul Walters of USA shot a 7-round capacity 1911 in major caliber .45 ACP. Fourth place Vidar Nakling from Norway used an 8-round capacity SIG P210 in 9×19mm minor. Fifth place Tommy Campbell of USA and sixth place Ray Chapman of USA both used major 7 round capacity 1911's in major .45 ACP like the bronze winner Raul Walters.

== Champions ==
Individual

Both Ray Chapman and David Westerhout was highly seeded before the match. Dave had already represented both Great Britain and Rhodesia in international competitions, and later also represented Zimbabwe at the 1980 Summer Olympics in Rapid Fire Pistol.

Overall	Competitor	Points	Percent
Gold	(Rhodesia) David Westerhout	1960.433	100.00%
Silver	(Rhodesia) Peter Maunder	1844.030	94.06%
Bronze	(United States) Raul Walters	1802.289	91.93%
4th	(Norway) Vidar Nakling	1802.272	91.93%
5th	(United States) Tom Campbell	1793.337	91.48%
6th	(United States) Ray Chapman	1778.371	90.71%
7th	(Rhodesia) Lionel Smith	1776.675	90.63%
8th	(United States) Jerry Usher	1741.721	88.84%
9th	(United States) Ron Lerch	1731.898	88.34%
10th	(United States) Leonard Knight	1719.523	87.71%

Teams

After six days of shooting the Rhodesian team claimed its second World Championship win in a row with the small margin of 41.010 points to the U.S. team. During the match there was never many points separating the two teams and the lead was traded throughout the match. Finally the results had to checked with a computer, and it wasn't until some time after the shooting was over that the Rhodesian team was declared as winners. South Africa came in third followed by Great Britain, West Germany and Belgium.

Overall	Country	Points	Percent	Team members
Gold	Rhodesia	8776.064	100.00%	Dave Westerhout (Team Captain), Lionel Smith, Alex du Plessis, Andy Langley and Peter Boniface
Silver	United States	8735.054	99.53%	
Bronze	South Africa	7808.542	88.98%	
4th	Great Britain	7437.616	73.67%	
5th	West Germany	6941.581	79.10%	
6th	Belgium	6465.203	73.67%	

(Other teams: Australia, Norway, and Switzerland.)

== See also ==
- IPSC Rifle World Shoots
- IPSC Shotgun World Shoot
- IPSC Action Air World Shoot
