= 2008 IPSC Handgun World Shoot =

International shooting tournament

2008 IPSC Handgun World Shoot XV
- Official logo of the 2008 IPSC Handgun World Shoot
- Location: Bali, Indonesia
- Dates: Wednesday 22. October to Saturday 1. November 2008
- Competitors: 1028

Medalists
gold medal	Open (Largest Division) (France) Eric Grauffel
silver medal	(United States) KC Eusebio
bronze medal	(United States) Max Michel

The 2008 IPSC Handgun World Shoot XV held in Bali, Indonesia, was the 15th IPSC Handgun World Shoot.

== Champions ==
=== Open ===
The Open division had the largest match participation with 353 competitors (34.3 %).

Individual

Overall	Competitor	Points	Overall Match Percent	
Gold	(France) Eric Grauffel	2643.9610	100.00%	
Silver	(United States) KC Eusebio	2508.1734	94.86%	
Bronze	(United States) Max Michel	2488.4818	94.12%	
4th	(Philippines) Jethro T. Dionisio	2480.7264	93.83%	
5th	(Philippines) Jeufro Emil Roe Lejano	2435.1801	92.10%	
6th	(Australia) Brodie McIntosh	2424.6960	91.71%	
7th	(Netherlands) Saul Kirsch	2423.3899	91.66%	
8th	(United States) Brad Balsley	2421.0126	91.57%	
9th	(United States) Chris Tilley	2416.1602	91.38%	
10th	(Spain) Jorge Ballesteros	2406.3240	91.01%	
Lady	Competitor	Points	Overall percent	Category percent
Gold	(United States) Athena Lee	1866.2329	70.58%	100.00%
Silver	(Austria) Gabriele Kraushofer	1859.5804	99.64%	70.33%
Bronze	(Czech Republic) Katerina Sustrova	1839.1670	98.55%	69.56%
Junior	Competitor	Points	Overall percent	Category percent
Gold	(United States) KC Eusebio	2508.1734	94.86%	100.00%
Silver	(United States) Brad Balsley	2421.0126	96.52%	91.57%
Bronze	(United States) Shane Coley	2215.5877	88.33%	83.80%
Senior	Competitor	Points	Overall percent	Category percent
Gold	(Italy) Mario Riillo	2081.1264	78.71%	100.00%
Silver	(Czech Republic) Miroslav Kamenicek	1975.2078	94.91%	74.71%
Bronze	(France) Thierry Obriot	1882.9393	90.48%	71.22%
Super Senior	Competitor	Points	Overall percent	Category percent
Gold	(France) Philippe Gibert	1832.2562	69.30%	100.00%
Silver	(France) Alain Tarrade	1762.4235	96.19%	66.66%
Bronze	(South Africa) Carlo Belletti	1710.0892	93.33%	64.68%

Teams

Place	Country	Points	Percent	Team members
Gold	United States	7412.00	100.00%	KC Eusebio, Max Michel, Chris Tilley, BJ Norris
Silver	Philippines	7174.00	96.79%	Jethro T. Dionisio, Jeufro Emil Roe Lejano, Stephen John V. Hinojales, Jerome Jovanne Morales
Bronze	France	7048.00	95.09%	Eric Grauffel, Emile Obriot, Remy Deville, William Joly

=== Modified ===
The Modified division had 50 competitors (4.9 %).

Individual

Overall	Competitor	Points	Overall Match Percent	
Gold	(United States) Jojo Vidanes	2564.3187	100.00%	
Silver	(Czech Republic) Zdenek Henes	2537.6644	98.96%	
Bronze	(United States) Michael Voigt	2513.2490	98.01%	
4th	(Philippines) Christopher D. Panganiban	2393.5401	93.34%	
5th	(Italy) Giuseppe Todaro	2361.9558	92.11%	
6th	(Italy) Davide Cerrato	2325.2693	90.68%	
7th	(Ecuador) Nicolas Taramelli	2251.1322	87.79%	
8th	(United States) James Ong	2249.8410	87.74%	
9th	(Philippines) Harold Paylago	2233.8600	87.11%	
10th	(Philippines) Bernardo Mari I Alejandro	2169.5276	84.60%	
Senior	Competitor	Points	Overall percent	Category percent
Gold	(Italy) Gavino Mura	1895.9348	73.94%	100.00%
Silver	(Hong Kong) Kwok Kwong Tong	1886.4656	73.57%	99.50%
Bronze	(Spain) Antonio Gracia Infante	1884.3596	73.48%	99.39%

Teams

Place	Country	Points	Percent	Team members
Gold	United States	7327.00	100.00%	Jojo Vidanes, Michael Voigt, James Ong, Barry Dueck
Silver	Philippines	6795.00	92.74%	Christopher D. Panganiban, Harold Paylago, Enrico Papa, Joel A. Tan
Bronze	Italy	6790.00	92.67%	Giuseppe Todaro, Davide Cerrato, Bruno La Bruna, Giorgio Patria

=== Standard ===
The Standard division had the second largest match participation with 309 competitors (30.1 %).

Individual

Overall	Competitor	Points	Overall Match Percent	
Gold	(United States) Travis Tomasie	2466.3816	100.00%	
Silver	(United States) Blake J. Miguez	2436.2544	98.78%	
Bronze	(United States) Shannon Smith	2420.4368	98.14%	
4th	(Czech Republic) Petr Znamenacek	2378.8803	96.45%	
5th	(Spain) Juan Carlos Jaime Diaz	2365.6483	95.92%	
6th	(Germany) Gregory Midgley	2339.7858	94.87%	
7th	(Italy) Adriano Santarcangelo	2332.4544	94.57%	
8th	(United States) Taran Butler	2286.4867	92.71%	
9th	(United States) Emanuel Bragg	2284.3192	92.62%	
10th	(Hungary) Gyorgy Batki	2256.8218	91.50%	
Lady	Competitor	Points	Overall percent	Category percent
Gold	(Australia) Claire Giles	1655.4699	67.12%	100.00%
Silver	(Philippines) Jannette Gonzaga	1646.7232	66.77%	99.47%
Bronze	(Austria) Birgit Gruber	1574.6317	63.84%	95.12%
Senior	Competitor	Points	Overall percent	Category percent
Gold	(Italy) Esterino Magli	2212.8031	89.72%	100.00%
Silver	(Brazil) Lucimar Oliveira	2075.0971	84.14%	93.78%
Bronze	(Philippines) Marlon G. Valencia	1949.0470	79.02%	88.08%
Super Senior	Competitor	Points	Overall percent	Category percent
Gold	(Germany) Max Sen. Wiegand	1721.7386	69.81%	100.00%
Silver	(Brazil) Antonio Vaghi	1625.7782	65.92%	94.43%
Bronze	(United States) Paul Clark	1372.5099	55.65%	79.72%

Teams

Place	Country	Points	Percent	Team members
Gold	United States	7173.00	100.00%	Travis Tomasie, Shannon Smith, Taran Butler, Emanuel Bragg
Silver	Italy	6739.00	93.95%	Adriano Santarcangelo, Esterino Magli, Leonardo Bettoni, Fabio Davoli
Bronze	Czech Republic	6659.00	92.83%	Petr Znamenacek, Zdenek Liehne, Roman Podlesak, Jaroslav Vaclavik

=== Production ===
The Production division had the third largest match participation with 282 competitors (27.4 %).

Individual

Overall	Competitor	Points	Overall Match Percent	
Gold	(Czech Republic) Adam Tyc	2506.8199	100.00%	
Silver	(United States) Matthew Mink	2371.9580	94.62%	
Bronze	(United States) Bob Vogel	2368.0915	94.47%	
4th	(United States) Daniel Horner	2325.5642	92.77%	
5th	(United States) Angus Hobdell	2310.7898	92.18%	
6th	(Spain) Eduardo de Cobos	2279.5476	90.93%	
7th	(Czech Republic) Vaclav Vinduska	2226.9555	88.84%	
8th	(Slovakia) Marian Vysny	2222.7145	88.67%	
9th	(Ecuador) Galo Moreira Icaza	2191.1119	87.41%	
10th	(Argentina) Gustavo Liwko	2158.3764	86.10%	
Lady	Competitor	Points	Overall percent	Category percent
Gold	(Philippines) Ma. Inez F. Jorge	1561.0948	62.27%	100.00%
Silver	(Thailand) Oryza Shelley De Leon	1492.2466	59.53%	95.59%
Bronze	(Philippines) Andrea Gasic	1464.5957	58.42%	93.82%
Junior	Competitor	Points	Overall percent	Category percent
Gold	(Ecuador) Galo Moreira Icaza	2191.1119	87.41%	100.00%
Silver	(Argentina) Gustavo Liwko	2158.3764	86.10%	98.51%
Bronze	(Slovakia) Andrej Hrnciarik	1996.6672	79.65%	91.13%
Senior	Competitor	Points	Overall percent	Category percent
Gold	(Philippines) Wilfredo Div Anglo	1894.6547	75.58%	100.00%
Silver	(Philippines) Daniel Torrevillas	1870.1455	74.60%	98.71%
Bronze	(South Africa) Robert Hopper	1869.7746	74.59%	98.69%

Teams

Place	Country	Points	Percent	Team members
Gold	United States	7050.00	100.00%	Matthew Mink, Robert Gordon Vogel, Angus Hobdell, David Olhasso
Silver	Czech Republic	6819.00	96.72%	Adam Tyc, Vaclav Vinduska, Michael Stryc, Jan Liehne
Bronze	Slovak Republic	6521.00	92.50%	Marian Vysny, Jan Palka, Ernest Nagy, Anton Penov

=== Revolver ===
The Revolver division had 34 competitors (3.3 %).

Individual

Overall	Competitor	Points	Overall Match Percent
Gold	(Ecuador) Ricardo López Tugendhat	2596.9062	100.00%
Silver	(Italy) Andrea Todeschini	2450.1457	94.35%
Bronze	(Philippines) Phillipp A. Chua	2376.9501	91.53%
4th	(Italy) Igor Rosa Brusin	2370.3966	91.28%
5th	(Czech Republic) Zdenek Nemecek	2342.2673	90.19%
6th	(Indonesia) Sonny Prabowo	2261.7306	87.09%
7th	(Switzerland) Markus Meichtry	2181.7730	84.01%
8th	(Philippines) Christopher Panes	2091.8594	80.55%
9th	(Italy) Luca Ricciardi	2067.3150	79.61%
10th	(Philippines) Hubert S. Sio	2030.1765	78.18%

Teams

Place	Country	Points	Percent	Team members
Gold	Italy	6887.00	100.00%	Andrea Todeschini, Igor Rosa Brusin, Luca Ricciardi, Claudio Zambonin
Silver	Philippines	6498.00	94.35%	Phillipp A. Chua, Christopher Panes, Hubert S. Sio
Bronze	Switzerland	5848.00	84.91%	Markus Meichtry, Rolf-Dieter Reich, Marwan Itany, Roger Ditzler

== See also ==
- IPSC Rifle World Shoots
- IPSC Shotgun World Shoot
- IPSC Action Air World Shoot
