= 1981 IPSC Handgun World Shoot =

International shooting tournament

1981 IPSC Handgun World Shoot V
- Location: Johannesburg, South Africa

Medalists
gold medal	(United States) Ross Seyfried
silver medal	(United States) John Shaw
bronze medal	(United States) Mike Plaxco

The 1981 IPSC Handgun World Shoot V held in Johannesburg, South Africa, was the fifth IPSC Handgun World Shoot, and was won by Ross Seyfried of United States, using a relatively stock firearm compared to the highly tuned firearms of many other shooters. Well known in the U.S., Ross had previously won the 1978 U.S. National Championship, and was member of the US National Team who placed second in the previous 1979 World Shoot. The 1981 championship showed the Americans return with a vengeance when both Ross Seyfried took the individual World Title and the US National Team took gold in the team classification.

== Equipment ==
Ross' victory in the 1981 World Shoot with his very plain 1911 in .45 ACP was the last for a very long time someone won a World Shoot title using a major single-stack handgun in .45 ACP. Equipment in IPSC had started to change drastically, and the following World Shoot in 1983 was won by Rob Leatham using a major 1911 in .38 Super. Competitors had started adding barrel mounted extended sights and compensators, and the .45 ACP came at disadvantage against compensated .38 Super's with less recoil and higher magazine capacity. Further, in the 90's, 2011 wide-frame double-stack handguns with even higher magazine capacity started to dominate both the Open and Standard division, making single-stack handguns like the 1911 and SIG P210 obsolete, until the 2014 IPSC Handgun World Shoot when an own Classic division for uncompensated single-stack 1911 handguns had been introduced. The 2014 IPSC Classic World Champion title went to Rob Leatham of USA, again using a 1911 in .45 ACP.

== Champions ==
Individual

Overall	Competitor	Points	Percent
Gold	(United States) Ross Seyfried		100.00%
Silver	(United States) John Shaw		%
Bronze	(United States) Mike Plaxco		%
4th			%
5th			%
6th			%
7th			%
8th			%
9th			%
10th			%

Teams

Overall	Country	Points	Percent	Team members
Gold	United States		100.00%	
Silver			%	
Bronze			%	
4th			%	
5th			%	
6th			%	

== See also ==
- IPSC Rifle World Shoots
- IPSC Shotgun World Shoot
- IPSC Action Air World Shoot
