= 1991 IPSC Individual Handgun World Championship =

International shooting tournament

Medalists
gold medal	(United States) John Dixon
silver medal	(South Africa) Johnny Ioannou
bronze medal	(South Africa) Jimmy von Sorgenfrei

The 1991 Individual World Championship was held in Johannesburg, South Africa, which was won by John Dixon of USA. The championship was boycotted by several shooters and not widely publicized. There were no team awards, and the championship was called an Individual Championship in distinction to the regular IPSC World Shoot title.

== Individual champions ==
Overall	Competitor	Points	Overall Match Percent	
Gold	(United States) John Dixon		100.00%	
Silver	(South Africa) Johnny Ioannou		97.60%	
Bronze	(South Africa) Jimmy von Sorgenfrei		97.46%	
4th	(South Africa) C Anderson		96.70%	
5th	(United States) Mike Yorke		96.56%	
6th	(South Africa) Nick Du Plessis		95.62%	
7th	(South Africa) Clint Rafferty		95.58%	
8th	(South Africa) W Richards		94.76%	
9th	(South Africa) Colin Amm		94.60%	
10th	(South Africa) Steve Chlup		93.95%	
Lady	Competitor	Points	Category percent	Overall percent
Gold	(United Kingdom) Collette Barnes		100.00%	%
Silver	(South Africa) Chanatel Accone		97.50%	%
Bronze	(South Africa) Ursula Lund		97.47%	%
4th	(South Africa) Riana Joubert		95.89%	%
5th	(United States) Shirley Hamilton		95.75%	%
6th	(United States) Tammy Madigan		89.25%	%

== See also ==
- IPSC Rifle World Shoots
- IPSC Shotgun World Shoot
- IPSC Action Air World Shoot
