= Adam Tyc =

Czech sport shooter

Personal information
- National team: Czech Republic
Medal record
IPSC
Representing Czech Republic
IPSC Handgun World Shoot
Gold medal – first place	2005 Guayaquil	Production
Gold medal – first place	2005 Guayaquil	Junior Production
Gold medal – first place	2008 Bali	Production
IPSC European Handgun Championship
Gold medal – first place	2004 Tábor	Production
Gold medal – first place	2007 Cheval Blanc	Production
IPSC Czech Handgun Championship
Gold medal – first place	2003	Standard
Gold medal – first place	2003	Junior Standard
Gold medal – first place	2004	Production
Silver medal – second place	2005	Production
Gold medal – first place	2006	Production

Adam Tyc (born 5 September 1986) is a Czech sport shooter with two gold medals in the IPSC Production division from the 2005 and 2008 IPSC Handgun World Shoots. At the 2005 World Shoot he was only 18 years old and also became Junior World Champion. He is also two time European champion (2004 and 2007), and has several IPSC Czech Handgun Championship titles. Adam is a member of CZ Shooting Team
