= 2025 IPSC Handgun World Shoot =

Handgun competition

Coordinates: 26.7932°S 26.8173°E

- Venue: Frontier Shooting Range
- Location: Matlosana, South Africa
- Dates: Opening Ceremony: 21 Sep; Main Match: 22-27 Sep; Shoot-Off: 28 Sep; Closing Ceremony: 28 Sep
- Competitors: 1622 from 86 nations

Medalists
gold medal	Production Optics (Largest Division) (France) Eric Grauffel
silver medal	(France) Emile Obriot
bronze medal	(United States) Jacob Hetherington

The 2025 IPSC Handgun World Shoot XX was held at Frontier Shooting Range, Stilfontein, near Matlosana, South Africa between 22 and 27 September. This year's edition is a six-day event, consisting of more than 1600 competitors shooting a total of 30 stages, making each competitor prove their skills are fast and accurate with nearly 600 rounds.

Eric Grauffel (FRA) won the largest division (Production Optics). Emile Obriot (FRA) won silver and Jacob Hetherington (USA) bronze.

== Results ==
=== Standard ===
The Standard division had 280 participants. Philippines bagged the gold and silver with Rolly Tecson scoring 100.00% Overall and Kahlil Adrian Viray scoring 99.93%. The USA got bronze with Scott Brown scoring 95.30%.

Overall

Overall	Competitor	Points	Overall Match Percent
Gold	(Philippines) Rolly Tecson	2647.3006	100.00%
Silver	(Philippines) Kahlil Adrian Viray	2645.4314	99.93%
Bronze	(United States) Scott Brown	2522.8785	95.30%

Junior

Junior	Competitor	Points	Category Match Percent	Overall Match Percent
Gold	(Slovakia) Ryan Hladík	2217.3331	100.00%	77.86%
Silver	(Austria) Kilian Molitor	1681.3100	81.57%	63.51%
Bronze	(Thailand) Naruethon Jarupianlert	1639.6200	79.54%	61.94%

Lady

Lady	Competitor	Points	Category Match Percent	Overall Match Percent
Gold	(France) Margaux Nycz	2005.0300	100.00%	75.74%
Silver	(Thailand) Kanyanat Prasertcharoensuk	1632.7000	81.43%	61.67%
Bronze	(Thailand) Pattharathida Makaew	1617.6400	80.68%	61.11%

Lady Senior

Lady Senior	Competitor	Points	Category Match Percent	Overall Match Percent
Gold	(South Africa) Eurika Du Plooy	1335.5300	100.00%	50.45%
Silver	(Portugal) Elsa Joaquim	1308.0400	97.94%	49.41%
Bronze	(Slovakia) Zuzana Botková	1287.2800	96.39%	48.63%

Senior

Senior	Competitor	Points	Category Match Percent	Overall Match Percent
Gold	(Czech Republic) Josef Rakusan	2217.3331	100.00%	83.76%
Silver	(Czech Republic) Petr Znamenacek	2077.9008	93.71%	78.49%
Bronze	(Serbia) Slavko Obradović	2011.9587	90.74%	76.00%

Super Senior

S.Senior	Competitor	Points	Category Match Percent	Overall Match Percent
Gold	(Italy) Adriano Ciro Santarcangelo	1949.1100	100.00%	73.63%
Silver	(Spain) Jesus Ferreiro Rodriguez	1846.8900	94.76%	69.76%
Bronze	(Montenegro) Ilya Gubin	1776.1500	91.13%	67.09%

Grand Senior

Grand Senior	Competitor	Points	Category Match Percent	Overall Match Percent
Gold	(Italy) Esterino Magli	1692.0300	100.00%	63.92%
Silver	(Germany) Dietmar Rauer	1430.6900	84.55%	54.04%
Bronze	(South Africa) Slavek Kurczewski	1355.4900	80.11%	51.20%

Teams

Teams	Members	Points
Overall
Gold	(Philippines) Rolly Tecson, Kahlil Adrian Viray, Joseph Jr Bernabe, Akeem Adrian Viray	7496.7014
Silver	(United States) Scott Brown, Gianni Giordano, Joseph Sauerland, Robert Krogh	7275.6379
Bronze	(Czech Republic) Zdenek Liehne, Martin Krejčí, Josef Rakusan, Petr Znamenacek	6775.8730
Senior
Gold	(Italy) Adriano Ciro Santarcangelo, Giulio Del Rosario, Paolo Paoletti, Leonardo Bettoni	5774.8269
Silver	(Spain) Jesus Ferreiro Rodriguez, Jose Vicente Turiegano Lacarte, Juan Jose Rojas Rodriguez, Antonio Comeche Martínez	5341.8858
Bronze	(South Africa) Jose Antero Cardoso, Jean Engelbrecht, Matthew Da Silva, Maciek Michalski	5313.4160

=== Classic ===
Classic division was the second smallest division with 142 competitors. There was a close race for the third place with four competitors being in 0.73 percent of each other

Overall

Overall	Competitor	Points	Overall Match Percent
Gold	(Slovenia) Robert Černigoj	2597.9894	100.00%
Silver	(United States) Jeffrey Cawthon	2499.4743	96.21%
Bronze	(Czech Republic) Jakub Marx	2487.2600	95.74%

Lady

Lady	Competitor	Points	Category Match Percent	Overall Match Percent
Gold	(United States) Jalise Williams	2315.0417	100.00%	89.11%
Silver	(Thailand) Nannalin Luangprasert	1693.3254	73.14%	65.18%
Bronze	(Philippines) Lenn lie Grace Onahon	1619.4403	69.95%	62.33%

Senior

Senior	Competitor	Points	Category Match Percent	Overall Match Percent
Gold	(Hungary) György Batki	2327.6883	100.00%	89.60%
Silver	(Philippines) Jethro Dionisio	1816.6255	98.88%	88.59%
Bronze	(Philippines) Daryl Gascon	1801.8980	93.55%	83.82%

Super Senior

S. Senior	Competitor	Points	Category Match Percent	Overall Match Percent
Gold	(Italy) Nicola Domenico Pedroli	1968.5099	100.00%	75.77%
Silver	(Italy) Valter Tranquilli	1904.9112	96.77%	73.32%
Bronze	(Spain) Antonio Cases	1819.4016	92.43%	70.03%

Grand Senior

Grand Senior	Competitor	Points	Category Match Percent	Overall Match Percent
Gold	(Brazil) Carlos Bicalho	1633.8933	100.00%	62.89%
Silver	(South Africa) Andre Van Straaten	1412.6887	86.46%	54.38%
Bronze	(France) Joel Gerard	1355.7435	82.98%	52.18%

Teams

Teams	Members	Points
Overall
Gold	(United States) Jeffrey Cawthon, Jeremy Reid, Tim Herron, Jalise Williams	7214.8558
Silver	(Philippines) Lenard Lopez, Vincent Thomas R de Luzuriaga, Alfredo Jr. Catalan, Jeufro Lejano	7207.3433
Bronze	(Italy) Vincenzo Mundo, Francesco Losi, Vittorio Anesa, Lorenzo Masieri	6792.1394
Senior
Gold	(Hungary) György Batki, Marcin Ciesielski, Gyula Miglecz, Mihaly Bobaly	6415.6973
Silver	(Philippines) Jethro Dionisio, Daryl Gascon, Reginald Dimayuga, Hermenegildo Jr. Junio	6286.3284
Bronze	(Italy) Antonio Sciurpi, Nicola Domenico Pedroli, Marcello Baldelli, Filippo Peruccacci	6062.5443

=== Revolver ===
The Revolver division was the smallest division in this World Shoot with only 37 competitors. Jay Slater secured the third place with only 0,04 percent ahead of Alex Bakken who finished fourth.

Overall

Overall	Competitor	Points	Overall Match Percent
Gold	(United States) Michael Poggie	2617.1949	100.00%
Silver	(United States) Rich Wolfe	2504.4075	95.69%
Bronze	(United States) Jay Slater	2452.6563	93.71%

Senior

Senior	Competitor	Points	Category Match Percent	Overall Match Percent
Gold	(Austria) Gerald Reiter	2252.0272	100.00%	86.05%
Silver	(Brazil) Moacir Azevedo	2112.6084	93.81%	80.72%
Bronze	(Thailand) Norasaed Chatratthapong	2034.7276	90.35%	77.74%

Teams

Teams	Members	Points
Overall
Gold	(United States) Michael Poggie, Rich Wolfe, Jay Slater, Alex Bakken	7574.2587
Silver	(Thailand) Phirun Leelasuntalert, Siwa Khanti, Kabin Susiwa, Norasaed Chatratthapong	7007.1443
Bronze	(Austria) Nikolaus Stelzmueller, Gerald Reiter, Robert Kroiss, Andreas Gruber	6717.2712

=== Production Optics ===
Eric Grauffel managed to win the largest division (430 competitors) with a lead of 4.14% over the second place.

Overall

Overall	Competitor	Points	Overall Match Percent
Gold	(France) Eric Grauffel	2641.400	100.00%
Silver	(France) Emile Obriot	2532.0742	95.86%
Bronze	(United States) Jacob Hetherington	2507.9225	94.95%

Super Junior

Super Junior	Competitor	Points	Category Match Percent	Overall Match Percent
Gold	(South Africa) Olebile Sefolo	1540.0400	100.00%	58.30%
Silver	(Norway) Adelén Sollyst	1488.9300	96.68%	56.37%
Bronze	(South Africa) Lea Brits	1168.5900	75.88%	44.24%

Junior

Junior	Competitor	Points	Category Match Percent	Overall Match Percent
Gold	(France) Robin Grauffel	2402.8448	100.00%	90.97%
Silver	(South Africa) Lehan Potgieter	2274.3600	94.65%	86.10%
Bronze	(Indonesia) Prabu Rakyan Nalyndra	2266.6500	94,33%	85.81%

Lady

Lady	Competitor	Points	Category Match Percent	Overall Match Percent
Gold	(United States) Justine Williams	2102.9200	100.00%	79.61%
Silver	(Sweden) Cecilia Lindberg	2015.1700	95.83%	76.29%
Bronze	(Australia) Naomi Phegan	2007.5400	95.46%	76.00%

Lady Senior

Lady Senior	Competitor	Points	Category Match Percent	Overall Match Percent
Gold	(Italy) Barbara Balestrini	1622.3600	100.00%	61.42%
Silver	(Germany) Claudia Remek-Lentz	1585.4600	97.73%	60.02%
Bronze	(South Africa) Janita Kruger	1399.3300	86.25%	52.98%

Senior

Senior	Competitor	Points	Category Match Percent	Overall Match Percent
Gold	(Australia) Paul Phegan	2197.2100	100.00%	83.18%
Silver	(Philippines) Jerome Morales	2174.0000	98.94%	82.30%
Bronze	(Czech Republic) Miroslav Zapletal	2148.2200	97.77%	81.33%

Super Senior

S. Senior	Competitor	Points	Category Match Percent	Overall Match Percent
Gold	(Sweden) Niclas Dal	1943.8300	100.00%	73.59%
Silver	(Spain) Jose Zanón	1898.3100	97.66%	71.87%
Bronze	(Canada) James Smith	1748.8100	89.97%	66.21%

Grand Senior

Grand Senior	Competitor	Points	Category Match Percent	Overall Match Percent
Gold	(Jamaica) Anthony Johnson	1439.0000	100.00%	54.48%
Silver	(Brazil) Thompson Mauro	1315.5800	91.42%	49.81%
Bronze	(South Africa) Stephanus Weyers	1181.0700	82.08%	44.71%

Teams

Teams	Members	Points
Overall
Gold	(France) Eric Grauffel, Emile Obriot, Robin Grauffel,Patrick Renaud	7576.3143
Silver	(United States) Jacob Hetherington, Jay Beal, Simon JJ Racaza, Tom Castro	7372.8850
Bronze	(Philippines) Edcel John Gino, Renbert Caesar Gustilo, Paul Bryant Yu, Jerome Morales	7290.8893
Lady
Gold	(United States) Justine Williams, Brennah Gaston, Kaylee Lane, Nicole Kolba	5701.0160
Silver	(Thailand) Mintra Pramote, Thanawadee Perkyam, Rayvadee Thupkham, Tanyalak Panyanantasit	5502.2945
Bronze	(South Africa) Madeline Muller, Sasha-Lee Du Plessis, Jennifer Timmer, Kirsty Bohler	5497.0817
Senior
Gold	(South Africa) Muhammed Ahmed Kolia, Austen Stockbridge, Alex Gogos, Neil Taylor	6202.6212
Silver	(Italy) Gianluca Mulazzani, Roberto Vezzoli, Francesco Cerniglia, Matteo Pellegris	6080.4699
Bronze	(United States) David Murphy, Ben Hardt, Samir Patel, Zuoming Zheng	6042.8376
Super Senior
Gold	(Sweden) Niclas Dal, Stefan Ekstedt, Kent Stangvik	5399.3644
Silver	(South Africa) Justin Naidoo, Hendrik Engelbrecht, Jonathan Fouche, Herman Schreiber	4943.1319
Bronze	(Norway) Rune Vikeby, Tony Østreng Tsigakis, Karl Jørgen Torkildsen, Lars Flugstad	4921.8667

=== Production ===
The second largest Division (421 competitors) was won by Mason Lane (USA). Argentina secured the second and third place with German Romitelli and Juan Pablo Duran

Overall

Overall	Competitor	Points	Overall Match Percent
Gold	(United States) Mason Lane	2584.7700	100.00%
Silver	(Argentina) German Romitelli	2563.2000	99.17%
Bronze	(Argentina) Juan Pablo Duran	2539.2900	98.24%

Junior

Junior	Competitor	Points	Category Match Percent	Overall Match Percent
Gold	(Panama) Julian Gonzalez	2319.4000	100.00%	89.73%
Silver	(Philippines) Acol Bullet Pascual	2282.2200	98.40%	88.29%
Bronze	(Slovakia) František Blaha	2235.5500	96.39%	86.49%

Lady

Lady	Competitor	Points	Category Match Percent	Overall Match Percent
Gold	(Italy) Camilla Almici	2178.6100	100.00%	84.29%
Silver	(Czech Republic) Petra Nemcova	2027.4400	93.06%	78.44%
Bronze	(Denmark) Sissal Skaale	2002.4400	91.91%	77.47%

Lady Senior

Lady Senior	Competitor	Points	Category Match Percent	Overall Match Percent
Gold	(Spain) Rosa Maria Domènech Mestres	1616.4600	100.00%	62.54%
Silver	(United States) Carina Randolph	1557.2100	96.33%	60.25%
Bronze	(Canada) Lise Mahoney	1490.3400	92.20%	57.66%

Senior

Senior	Competitor	Points	Category Match Percent	Overall Match Percent
Gold	(Spain) Eduardo De Cobos Abreu	2450.9900	100.00%	92.82%
Silver	(Serbia) Ljubiša Momčilović	2209.5700	90.15%	85.48%
Bronze	(Italy) Claudio Cozzella	2199.7400	89.75%	85.10%

Super Senior

S. Senior	Competitor	Points	Category Match Percent	Overall Match Percent
Gold	(Italy) Edoardo Roberto Buticchi	1956.9700	100.00%	75.71%
Silver	(Greece) Iosif Iosif	1923.9200	98.31%	74.43%
Bronze	(Argentina) Adrian Burgos	1876.0100	95.86%	72.58%

Teams

Teams	Members	Points
Overall
Gold	(Argentina) German Romitelli, Juan Pablo Duran, Gaston Quindi Vallerga, Franco Savarelli	7599.2256
Silver	(United States) Mason Lane, Nils Jonasson, Sal Luna, Casey Reed	7556.7793
Bronze	(Italy) Federico Trionfetti, Valerio Passalia, Mirko Carapacchi, Silvio Maria Perongini	7109.3977
Lady
Gold	(Italy) Camilla Almici, Chiara Neviani, Monica Rasi Caldogno, Virginia Sassu	5775.9042
Silver	(Spain) Alexandra Darias, Airi Rodríguez Domènech, Rosa Maria Domènech Mestres, Yuraima Díaz González	5529.9569
Bronze	(Thailand) Patcharin Innhom, Anda Johnmee, Manatsanun Ariyarattanahirun	5509.6525
Senior
Gold	(Italy) Claudio Cozzella, Gianluca Passalia, Giovanni Zuccolo, Andrea Iorfino	6390.0333
Silver	(Czech Republic) Ladislav Hanzlicek, Vaclav Vinduska, Michael Strýc, Zdeněk Němeček	6206.7920
Bronze	(Spain) Sergiy Oskoma, Buenaventura Darias Medina, Santiago Manuel del Pozo Burruecos, Jose ManuelL Rodríguez Conde	5821.3115
Super Senior
Gold	(South Africa) Thomas Grobler, Wayne Hammond, Andy Charalambous, Herman Steenkamp	4565.4375
Silver	(Norway) Folke Myrvang, Eindride Stien, Inger Skjold Bratli	4386.6674
Bronze	(Germany) Ludwig Bowakow, Reinhard Kelterbaum, Armin Terving	4240.7993

=== Open ===
All 3 medals in Open Overall were won by US Shooters. Christian Sailer came in first with Michael Hwang and Bryan Jones following on second and third place.

Overall

Overall	Competitor	Points	Overall Match Percent
Gold	(United States) Christian Sailer	2684.9400	100.00%
Silver	(United States) Michael Hwang	2548.4800	94.92%
Bronze	(United States) Bryan Jones	2505.1500	93.30%

Junior

Junior	Competitor	Points	Category Match Percent	Overall Match Percent
Gold	(Thailand) Siraphob Hemmala	2300.7800	100.00%	85.69%
Silver	(United States) Gian Gumagay	2264.8900	98.44%	84.36%
Bronze	(Philippines) Luisito Miguel De Guzman	2187.6200	95.08%	81.48%

Lady

Lady	Competitor	Points	Category Match Percent	Overall Match Percent
Gold	(Italy) Denny Rossetto	2128.2600	100.00%	79.27%
Silver	(Philippines) Erin Mattea Micor	2056.9500	96.65%	76.61%
Bronze	(Czech Republic) Martina Sera	2031.1800	95.44%	75.65%

Lady Senior

Lady Senior	Competitor	Points	Category Match Percent	Overall Match Percent
Gold	(Austria) Margit Steurer	1704.0400	100.00%	63.47%
Silver	(Italy) Carina Trevisani	1519.5600	89.17%	56.60%
Bronze	(Italy) Barbara Franchini	1515.4900	88.93%	56.44%

Senior

Senior	Competitor	Points	Category Match Percent	Overall Match Percent
Gold	(Australia) Brodie McIntosh	2473.5400	100.00%	92.13%
Silver	(Argentina) Daniel Horacio Minaglia	2405.5600	97.25%	89.59%
Bronze	(United States) Henning Wallgren	2227.8600	90.07%	82.98%

Super Senior

S. Senior	Competitor	Points	Category Match Percent	Overall Match Percent
Gold	(United States) Joe Draghi	2098.9100	100.00%	78.17%
Silver	(United States) Frank William Garcia	2021.3600	96.31%	75.29%
Bronze	(United States) Leighton Oosthuisen	1958.3300	93.30%	72.94%

Grand Senior

Grand Senior	Competitor	Points	Category Match Percent	Overall Match Percent
Gold	(Brazil) José Josias Lucena Ferreira	1635.5900	100.00%	60.92%
Silver	(Brazil) Jaime Roberto Maia Saldanha	1572.1400	96.12%	58.55%
Bronze	(South Africa) Carlo Belletti	1570.9800	96.05%	58.51%

Teams

Teams	Members	Points
Overall
Gold	(United States) Christian Sailer, Bryan Jones, John Vlieger, Aaron Eddins	7652.4436
Silver	(Czech Republic) Robin Šebo, Miroslav Havlíček, Marek Neumann, Martin Navrátil	7061.5593
Bronze	(Brazil) Jaime Saldanha Jr, Joao Carlos Stevenson Carvalho, Marcio Gabriel Caplan de Araujo, Nicolas Fiorini Oechsler	7032.5839
Lady
Gold	(Philippines) Erin Mattea Micor, Andreana Lorine Yacat, Knelma Grace Mateo, Noriko Jann Okamoto	5937.3340
Silver	(United States) Meghan Smiley, Anna McCarthy, Lynda Danyelle Turnbull, Jessica Jonasson	5685.5483
Bronze	(Czech Republic) Martina Šerá, Lenka Horejsi, Kateřina Šustrová	5598.9681
Senior
Gold	(United States) Henning Wallgren, Shannon Smith, Lee Nuguit, Joseph Draghi	6575.3542
Silver	(South Africa) Pierre Wrogemann, Mark Gogos, Pieter Bouwer, Mogamat Hishaam Ally	5953.4490
Bronze	(Thailand) Chalermpol Chomrit, Ranakorn Phathanasap, Sansern Samalapa, Peerapong Sonthiniwat	5844.4207
Super Senior
Gold	(United States) Frank William Garcia, Leighton Oosthuisen, Manuel Rodero, James Boone	5889.4019
Silver	(South Africa) Hubert Montgomery, David Coetzee, Eddie Smith, Kenny Van Der Merwe	5579.5205
Bronze	(Thailand) Vorapol Kulchairattana, Sasavat Sirison, Wat Srijinta-anggul	4985.3200

=== Family Teams ===
Family Teams consist of two members, one being a Junior and the other either a parent or grandparent of the Junior. It is not necessary that both members compete in the same division.

Teams	Members	Points
Gold	(France) Eric Grauffel, Robin Grauffel	5044.2401
Silver	(Germany) Leon Dauphin, Andreas Dauphin	4348.5233
Bronze	(Indonesia) Sonny Prabowo, Sultan Omar Ali	4282.5823

== See also ==
- IPSC Rifle World Shoots
- IPSC Shotgun World Shoot
- IPSC Handgun World Shoots
- IPSC Action Air World Shoot
