= Ron Avery =

American sport shooter and firearms instructor

Ronald E. Avery
Personal information
- National team: United States
- Born: September 22, 1956
- Died: February 23, 2019 (aged 62)
Medal record
IPSC
Representing United States
IPSC Handgun World Shoot
Bronze medal – third place	2002 Pietersburg	Standard
Bronze medal – third place	2014 Frostproof	Standard Senior
IPSC US Handgun Championship
Gold medal – first place	2013 Frostproof	Standard

Ronald E. Avery (September 22, 1956 – February 23, 2019) was an American sport shooter and firearms instructor who took bronze in the Standard division at the 2002 IPSC Handgun World Shoot and bronze in the Standard division Senior category at the 2014 IPSC Handgun World Shoot. He also took the Standard division title in the 2013 IPSC US Handgun Championship and the Limited-10 division title at the 2000 USPSA Handgun Nationals.

== Teaching ==
Ron focused most of his instruction on developing a doctrine for shooting called "Reactive Shooting Science", which he termed "the earliest way to get a hit and then do it again". He taught for various academies, for his own Practical Shooting Academy, and in 2013 founded the Tactical Performance Center as a destination training academy centered around developing and teaching Reactive Shooting. He and others at the school created numerous videos on the Tactical Performance Center YouTube channel that document the details of Reactive Shooting.

In 2007 Ron did a shooting seminar and practical course for the Bulgarian IPSC team, who was going to participate in the World Shoot France that same year.

== Death ==
Ron died on February 23, 2019, at the age of 62 from cancer, and was remembered at the 2019 USPSA National Championship in St. George, Utah, on September 24 2019.

== See also ==
- Rob Leatham
- Brian Enos
