= 1988 IPSC Handgun World Shoot =

International shooting tournament

1988 IPSC Handgun World Shoot VIII
- Location: Caracas, Venezuela

Medalists
| gold medal | (United States) Rob Leatham |
| silver medal | (United States) Chip McCormick |
| bronze medal | (United States) John Dixon |

The 1988 IPSC Handgun World Shoot VIII held in Caracas, Venezuela was the eighth IPSC Handgun World Shoot, and was won by Ross Seyfried of the United States.

== Champions ==
Individual

| Overall | Competitor | Points | Overall Match Percent | |
|---|---|---|---|---|
| Gold | (United States) Rob Leatham | | 100.00% | |
| Silver | (United States) Chip McCormick | | % | |
| Bronze | (United States) John Dixon | | % | |
| 4th | (United States) Jerry Barnhart | | % | |
| 5th | (United States) Frank Garcia | | % | |
| 6th | (United States) Gary Haltmann | | % | |
| 7th | (Norway) Arnt Magne Myhre | | % | |
| 8th | (United States) Jake Kempton | | % | |
| 9th | (United States) Doug Evantic | | % | |
| 10th | (United States) Brian Enos | | % | |
| Lady | Competitor | Points | Overall percent | Category percent |
| Gold | (United States) Debbie James | | % | 100.00% |
| Silver | (United States) Judy Smith | | % | % |
| Bronze | (South Africa) Inez Behrendt | | % | % |
| 4th | (United States) Christie Roger | | % | % |
| 5th | (Canada) Kerry Lathwell | | % | % |
| 6th | (United States) Roberta Geer | | % | % |
| 7th | (United States) Tammy Madigan | | % | % |
| 8th | (Canada) Lorna Pavelka | | % | % |

Teams

| Overall | Country | Points | Percent | Team members |
|---|---|---|---|---|
| Gold | United States | | 100.00% | J. Michael Plaxco, Rob Leatham, Jerry Barnhart, Tom Campbell, Chip McCormick, Brian Enos |
| Silver | Austria | | % | |
| Bronze | Great Britain | | % | |
| 4th | Philippines | | % | |
| 5th | Switzerland | | % | |
| 6th | Belgium | | % | |
| 7th | Venezuela | | % | |
| 8th | Germany | | % | |
| 9th | Australia | | % | |

== See also ==
- IPSC Rifle World Shoots
- IPSC Shotgun World Shoot
- IPSC Action Air World Shoot
