= 1979 IPSC Handgun World Shoot =

International shooting tournament

1979 IPSC Handgun World Shoot IV
- Location: Roodepoort, Johannesburg, South Africa
- Dates: 10. to 19. September 1970
- Competitors: 185 from 15 nations

Medalists
| gold medal | (South Africa) Jimmy Von Sorgenfrei |
| silver medal | (United States) Raul Walters |
| bronze medal | (United States) Ross Seyfried |

The 1979 IPSC Handgun World Shoot IV held in Johannesburg, South Africa was the fourth IPSC Handgun World Shoot, and was won by Jimmy Von Sorgenfrei, one of the top seeds before the championship. Leading up to the championship, the South African team had many good competitors, making the team selection tough. Seemingly out of nowhere Jimmy Von Sorgenfrei had appeared on the competition circuit, improving his performances consistently throughout the year before the championship, and was selected for the South African National Team of five men.

== Champions ==
Individual

| Overall | Competitor | Points | Percent |
|---|---|---|---|
| Gold | (South Africa) Jimmy von Sorgenfrei | 485.709 | 100.00% |
| Silver | (United States) Raul Walters | 480.001 | 98.82% |
| Bronze | (United States) Ross Seyfried | 470.814 | 96.93% |
| 4th | (South Africa) Gavin Carson | 454.348 | 93.4% |
| 5th | (United States) Bill Wilson | 453.446 | 93.35% |
| 6th | (United States) Mike Dalton | 446.331 | 91.89% |
| 7th | (Norway) Vidar Nakling | 425.435 | 87.59% |
| 8th | (United States) Craig Gifford | 424.108 | 87.31% |
| 9th | (United Kingdom) Bob Dunkley | 423.632 | 87.21% |
| 10th | (United States) Mickey Fowler | 409.251 | 84.25% |

Teams

| Overall | Country | Points | Percent | Team members |
|---|---|---|---|---|
| Gold | South Africa | 1897 points | 100.00% | A. Bress, C. Gavin Carson, A.J. Ellingsford, C.D. Guthrie, Jimmy H. von Sorgenfrei, F.P. Slack (reserve) |
| Silver | United States | 1881 points | % | Tom E. Campbell, L. Mickey Fowler, Ross J. Seyfried, G.D. Taylor, J.A. Usher, R. Lerch (reserve) |
| Bronze | Rhodesia | 1832 points | % | Peter Maunder, Lionel Smith, P. Bontface, A. Langley, Alex du Plessis, A. Weeks (reserve) |
| 4th | Norway | 1749 points | % | Vidar Nakling, Erik Andersen, Erik Braathen, Johnny Hoffmann, Per G. Høidal, Arnfinn Andersen (reserve) |
| 5th | United Kingdom | 1622 points | % | R. Stockenbridge, M.G. Baldock, R. Chittleborough, B. Hughes, J. Dodd, T.M. Morris (reserve) |
| 6th | South West Africa (Namibia) | 1397 points | % | A.W. Brendell, C.J. Bronkhorst, T.E. Smit, C.J. Thatcher, C.A. van der Staaten, W. Hlasek (reserve) |
| 7th | West Germany | 1342 points | % | J.M. Hennig, A. Lennert, A. Pauckner, G. Schiefke, M. Wiegand (reserve), R. Meyer (reserve) |
| ? th | Netherlands | ? points | % | A.C. Gobel, J.W.F. Haverkamp, R.L. Jansen, J.N. Pieterman, W.D.J. Vaags |
| ? th | Canada | ? points | % | R.E. Dunn, R.J. Fisher, R.A. Laycock, A.B. Page, R.A. Philipsen |
| ? th | Austria | ? points | % | F. Coirmann, H.R. Jelinek, R. Riedel, G. Gerschapsher, K.P.A. Herbort (reserve), H.A.W. Rofer (reserve) |

== See also ==
- IPSC Rifle World Shoots
- IPSC Shotgun World Shoot
- IPSC Action Air World Shoot
