= IPSC Handgun World Shoots =

World championship in handgun shooting

Practical handgun
- Formerly: Practical pistol
- Classification: ICS (IPSC Classification System)
- Sport: Practical shooting
- Founded: In the 1970s
- Motto: "Diligentia, Vis, Celeritas" (DVC), Latin for "precision, power, speed"
- No. of teams: National teams
- Country: Over 100
- Venue: Shooting ranges
- Confederation: African, Australasian, European and Pan-American Zones
- Most recent champion: (France) Eric Grauffel (2025)
- Most titles: (France) Eric Grauffel (9 times)
- Qualification: Region dependent number of slots. Regional selection procedures.
- Level on pyramid: 5
- Domestic cup: National championships
- Related competitions: IPSC Rifle, Shotgun and Action Air World Shoots
- Website: ipsc.org
- 2025 IPSC Handgun World Shoot

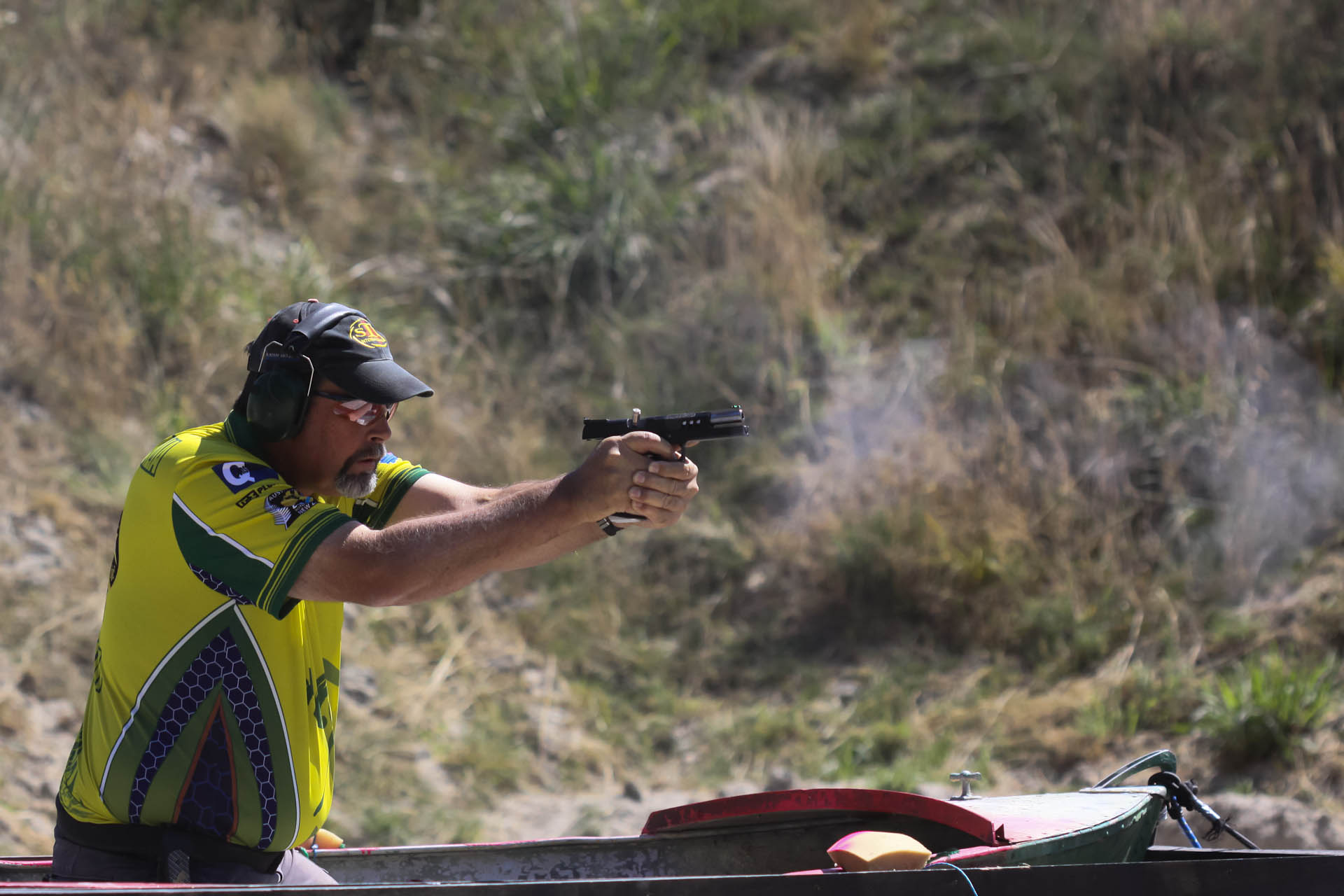
An Australian competitor firing his handgun from a seated position during the 2013 IPSC Australasia Handgun Championship.

The IPSC Handgun World Shoot is the highest level handgun match within the International Practical Shooting Confederation (IPSC) which consists of several days and at least 30 separate courses of fire. The Handgun World Shoots are held triennially on a rotational cycle with the other two main IPSC disciplines Rifle and Shotgun.

World Shoot main matches are held over six days with five days of shooting and one rest day, making the competition a shooting marathon where strategy and mental focus is of critical importance.

== History ==
The first IPSC World Shoot was held in 1975 in Zurich, and the two following were held with one year intervals. After 1977 the World Shoots were held at two year intervals until 1983 when the schedule was changed to the three year intervals used today.

Until and including 1991 there were no equipment divisions, but equipment had gradually become more and more specialized with extended front sights, compensators and even optical sights. At the 1991 Handgun World Shoot in Adelaide, Australia, Doug Koenig of USA became the first competitor to win the World Shoot using a red dot sight. In the following 1993 Handgun World Shoot competitors would be divided into divisions based on the equipment, thereof whether the firearm had an optical sight and compensator (Open or Modified division) or iron sights (Standard division). In 1999 the Revolver and Production divisions were introduced, and became recognized divisions from January 2000, making their first appearance in World Level competition at the 2002 Handgun World Shoot. In 2011 the Modified division was retired to make room for the Classic division, in commemoration of the 1911 single stack which historically had been so important for IPSC Handgun and handgun shooting sports in general for many years.

=== List of Handgun World Shoots ===
- 1975 Handgun World Shoot in Zurich, Switzerland
- 1976 Handgun World Shoot in Salzburg, Austria
- 1977 Handgun World Shoot in Salisbury, Rhodesia
- 1979 Handgun World Shoot in Roodepoort, Johannesburg, South Africa
- 1981 Handgun World Shoot in Johannesburg, South Africa
- 1983 Handgun World Shoot in Virginia, United States
- 1986 Handgun World Shoot in Florida, United States
- 1988 Handgun World Shoot in Caracas, Venezuela
- 1990 Handgun World Shoot in Adelaide, Australia
- 1991 Individual Handgun World Championship, Johannesburg, South Africa
- 1993 Handgun World Shoot at the National Shooting Centre at Bisley, Bisley, Surrey, England
- 1996 Handgun World Shoot in Brasília, Brazil
- 1999 Handgun World Shoot in Cebu, Philippines
- 2002 Handgun World Shoot in Pietersburg, South Africa
- 2005 Handgun World Shoot in Guayaquil, Ecuador
- 2008 Handgun World Shoot in Bali, Indonesia
- 2011 Handgun World Shoot in Rhodes, Greece
- 2014 Handgun World Shoot in Frostproof, Florida, United States
- 2017 Handgun World Shoot at the National Shooting Centre in Châteauroux, France
- 2022 Handgun World Shoot in Pattaya, Thailand
- 2025 Handgun World Shoot in Matlosana, South Africa

== Individual Champions ==
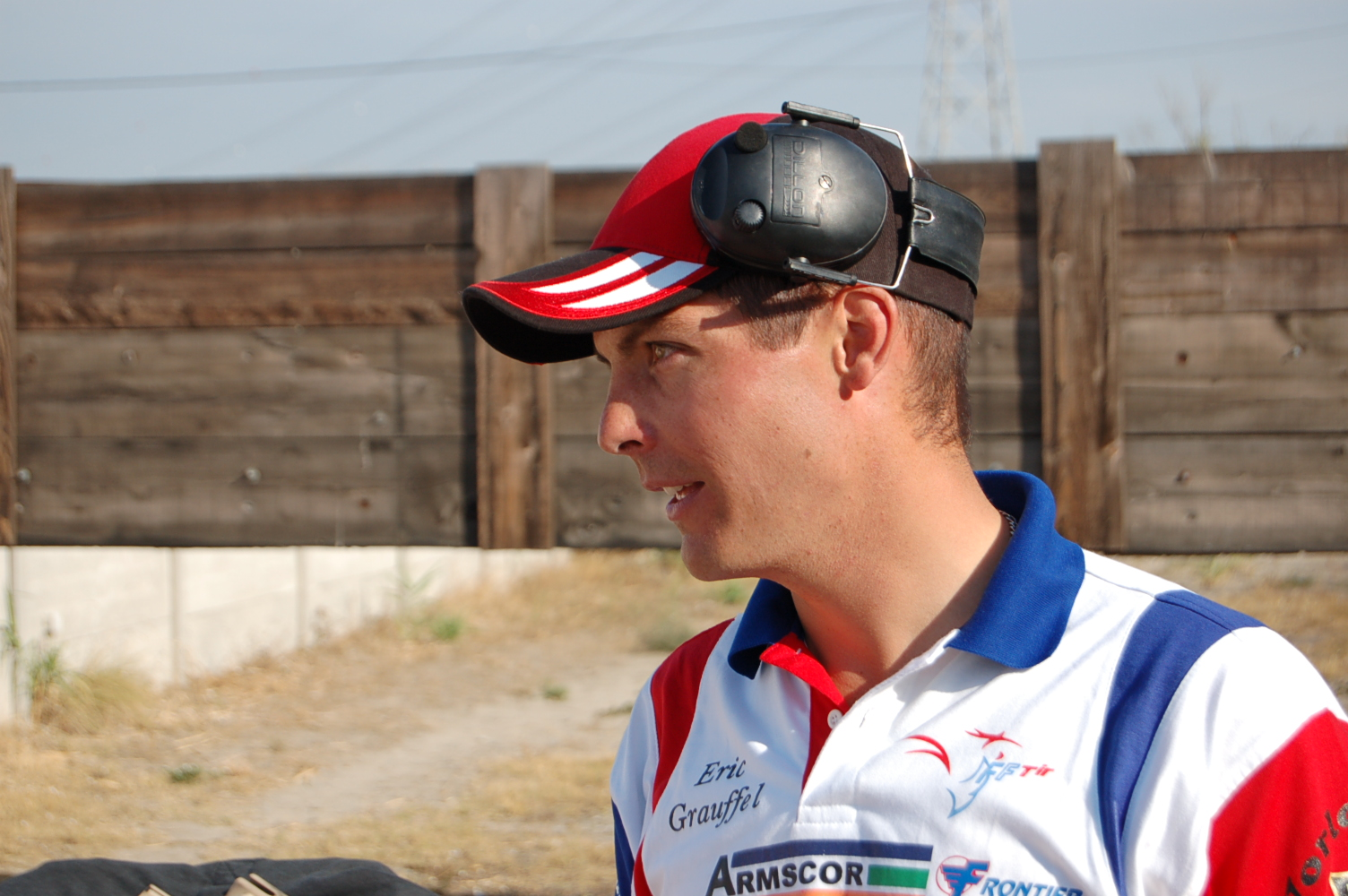
Eric Grauffel from France, nine time IPSC Handgun World Champion.

The following is a list of previous and current Handgun World Champions:

=== Overall category ===
Year	Division	Gold	Silver	Bronze	World Shoot
1975		(United States) Ray Chapman	(Switzerland) Paul Bakocs	(Rhodesia) Lionel Smith	World Shoot I
1976		(Norway) Jan Foss	(United States) Ray Chapman	(Rhodesia) Lionel Smith	World Shoot II
1977		(Rhodesia) Dave Westerhout	(Rhodesia) Peter Maunder	(United States) Raul Walters	World Shoot III
1979		(South Africa) Jimmy Von Sorgenfrei	(United States) Raul Walters	(United States) Ross Seyfried	World Shoot IV
1981		(United States) Ross Seyfried	(United States) John Shaw	(United States) Mike Plaxco	World Shoot V
1983		(United States) Rob Leatham	(United States) John Shaw	(United States) Mike Plaxco	World Shoot VI
1986		(United States) Rob Leatham	(United States) Jerry Barnhart	(United States) John Shaw	World Shoot VII
1988		(United States) Rob Leatham	(United States) Chip McCormick	(United States) John Dixon	World Shoot VIII
1990		(United States) Doug Koenig	(United States) Jerry Barnhart	(United States) Rob Leatham	World Shoot IX
1991		(United States) John Dixon	(South Africa) Johnny Ioannou	(South Africa) Jimmy von Sorgenfrei	Individual World Championship
1993	Open	(Canada) Matthew Mclearn	(United States) Doug Koenig	(United States) Michael Voigt	World Shoot X
1993	Modified	(Switzerland) Robert Buntschu	(United Kingdom) R Bhella	(United States) K Smith	World Shoot X
1993	Standard	(United States) Ted Bonnet	(United States) Brian Enos	(Germany) Max Wiegand	World Shoot X
1996	Open	(United States) Todd Jarrett	(United States) Jerry Barnhart	(United States) Rob Leatham	World Shoot XI
1996	Modified	(United States) Fred Craig	(Philippines) Richard Daniel Kahler	(Philippines) Richard Kahler	World Shoot XI
1996	Standard	(United States) Ted Bonnet	(United States) Frank Garcia	(United States) Jay Christy	World Shoot XI
1999	Open	(France) Eric Grauffel	(United States) Todd Jarrett	(Philippines) Jethro Dionisio	World Shoot XII
1999	Modified	(Czech Republic) Pavel Jasanský	(Philippines) Enrico Papa	(Philippines) Luis Lee	World Shoot XII
1999	Standard	(United States) Michael Voigt	(United States) Frank William Garcia	(Italy) Adriano Santarcangelo	World Shoot XII
2002	Open	(France) Eric Grauffel	(United States) Todd Jarrett	(Australia) Brodie McIntosh	World Shoot XIII
2002	Modified	(South Africa) Austen Stockbridge	(Philippines) Jeufro Lejano	(Italy) Edoardo Buticchi	World Shoot XIII
2002	Standard	(United States) Rob Leatham	(United States) Michael Voigt	(United States) Ron Avery	World Shoot XIII
2002	Production	(United States) David Sevigny	(Italy) Paul Brocanelli	(Uruguay) Guillermo Jude	World Shoot XIII
2002	Revolver	(United States) Jerry Miculek	(Switzerland) Daniel Roch	(Italy) Alain Marco Della Savia	World Shoot XIII
2005	Open	(France) Eric Grauffel	(United States) Todd Jarrett	(Spain) Jorge Ballesteros	World Shoot XIV
2005	Modified	(Philippines) Jeufro Jag Lejano	(Brazil) Augusto Ribas	(Philippines) Nelson Uygongco	World Shoot XIV
2005	Standard	(United States) Rob Leatham	(Uruguay) Juan Carlos Jaime Diaz	(United States) Travis Tomasie	World Shoot XIV
2005	Production	(Czech Republic) Adam Tyc	(United States) Dave Sevigny	(United States) Angus Hobdell	World Shoot XIV
2005	Revolver	(United States) Jerry Miculek	(Ecuador) Ricardo López Tugendhat	(Netherlands) Bjorn Dietrich	World Shoot XIV
2008	Open	(France) Eric Grauffel	(United States) KC Eusebio	(United States) Max Michel	World Shoot XV
2008	Modified	(United States) Jojo Vidanes	(Czech Republic) Zdeněk Heneš	(United States) Michael Voigt	World Shoot XV
2008	Standard	(United States) Travis Tomasie	(United States) Blake J. Miguez	(United States) Shannon Smith	World Shoot XV
2008	Production	(Czech Republic) Adam Tyc	(United States) Matthew Mink	(United States) Bob Vogel	World Shoot XV
2008	Revolver	(Italy) Andrea Todeschini	(Ecuador) Ricardo López Tugendhat	(Philippines) Phillipp A. Chua	World Shoot XV
2011	Open	(France) Eric Grauffel	(United States) Simon Racaza	(United States) KC Eusebio	World Shoot XVI
2011	Modified	(Czech Republic) Zdeněk Heneš	(Philippines) Jerome Jovanne Morales	(United States) Rob Leatham	World Shoot XVI
2011	Standard	(United States) Blake Miguez	(Argentina) Juan Carlos Jaime	(United States) Ted Puente	World Shoot XVI
2011	Production	(United States) Bob Vogel	(United States) Ben Stoeger	(United States) Matthew Mink	World Shoot XVI
2011	Revolver	(Ecuador) Ricardo López Tugendhat	(United States) Jerry Miculek	(United States) Matthew Griffin	World Shoot XVI
2014	Open	(United States) Max Michel	(United States) Shane Coley	(Australia) Brodie McIntosh	World Shoot XVII
2014	Standard	(United States) Nils Jonasson	(United States) Bob Vogel	(United States) Dave Sevigny	World Shoot XVII
2014	Production	(France) Eric Grauffel	(United States) Simon Racaza	(United States) Ben Stoeger	World Shoot XVII
2014	Classic	(United States) Rob Leatham	(Philippines) Edward Rivera	(United States) Todd Jarrett	World Shoot XVII
2014	Revolver	(Ecuador) Ricardo López Tugendhat	(United States) Josh Lentz	(Philippines) Phillipp Chua	World Shoot XVII
2017	Open	(Spain) Jorge Ballesteros	(United States) Simon Racaza	(France) Emile Obriot	World Shoot XVIII
2017	Standard	(France) Eric Grauffel	(United States) Bob Vogel	(United States) Nils Jonasson	World Shoot XVIII
2017	Production	(United States) Ben Stoeger	(Russia) Pavel Torgashov	(Spain) Eduardo de Cobos	World Shoot XVIII
2017	Classic	(United States) Elias Frangoulis	(Philippines) Jeufro Emil Lejano	(Philippines) Jethro Dionisio	World Shoot XVIII
2017	Revolver	(United States) Michael William Poggie	(Austria) Gerald Reiter	(United States) Joshua Lentz	World Shoot XVIII
2022	Open	(United States) Christian Sailer	(Philippines) Edcel John Gino	(United States) Chris Tilley	World Shoot XIX
2022	Standard	(Philippines) Kahlil Adrian Viray	(Philippines) Rolly Nathaniel Tecson	(United States) Nils Jonasson	World Shoot XIX
2022	Production	(France) Eric Grauffel	(Argentina) German Romitelli	(Philippines) Aeron Jhon Lanuza	World Shoot XIX
2022	Classic	(Philippines) Jeufro Emil Lejano	(Poland) Bartosz Szczesny	(Philippines) Alfredo Catalan Jr	World Shoot XIX
2022	Revolver	(Austria) Gerald Reiter	(Indonesia) Sonny Prabowo	(Thailand) Kabin Susiwa	World Shoot XIX
2022	Production Optics	(United States) Simon Racaza	(Thailand) Hassana Wijitpatima	(Czech Republic) Martin Kameníček	World Shoot XIX
2022	Production Optics Light	(United States) Xuefeng Cao	(Thailand) Phiranat Tanpairoh	(United States) Max Michel Jr	World Shoot XIX
2025	Standard	(Philippines) Rolly Tecson	(Philippines) Kahlil Adrian Viray	(United States) Scott Brown	World Shoot XX
2025	Classic	(Slovenia) Robert Černigoj	(United States) Jeffrey Cawthon	(Czech Republic) Jakub Marx	World Shoot XX
2025	Revolver	(United States) Michael Poggie	(United States) Rich Wolfe	(United States) Jay Slater	World Shoot XX
2025	Production Optics	(France) Eric Grauffel	(France) Emile Obriot	(United States) Jacob Hetherington	World Shoot XX
2025	Production	(United States) Mason Lane	(Argentina) German Romitelli	(Argentina) Juan Pablo Duran	World Shoot XX
2025	Open	(United States) Christian Sailer	(United States) Michael Hwang	(United States) Bryan Jones	World Shoot XX

=== Lady category ===
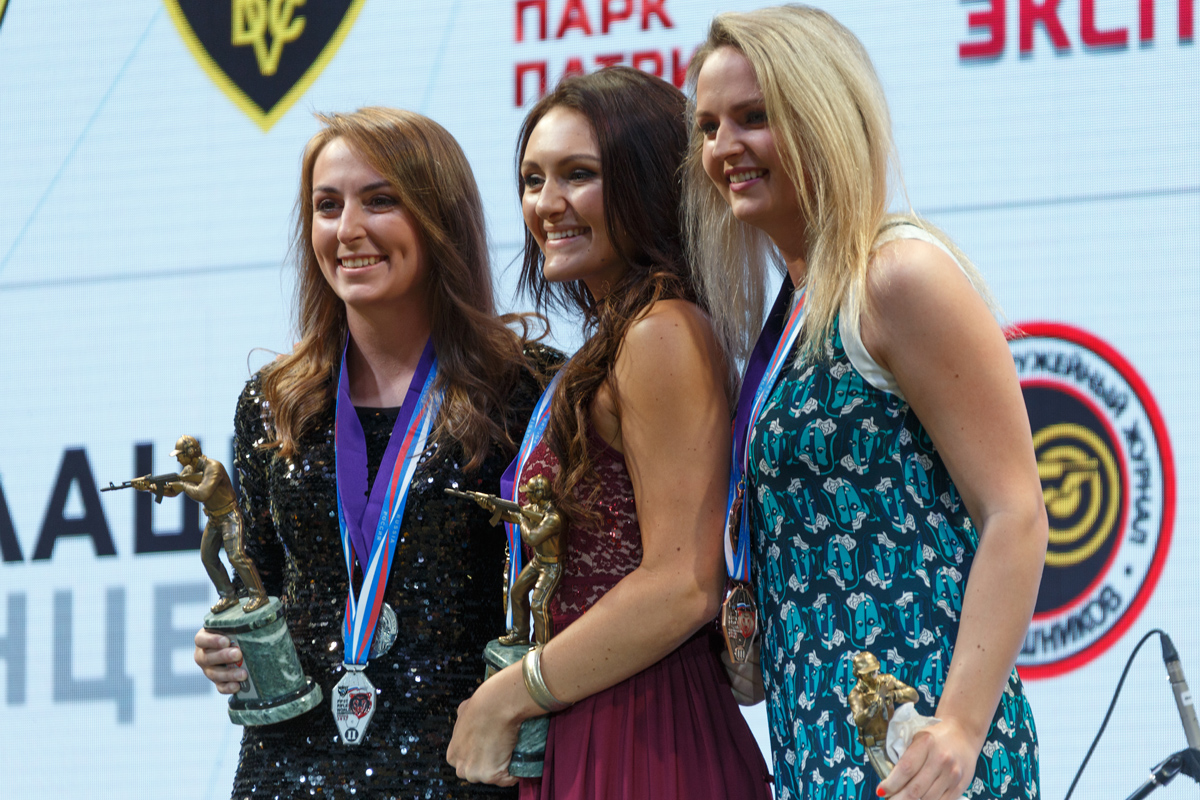
From left to right: Ashley Rheuark, Lena Miculek and Maria Gushchina.

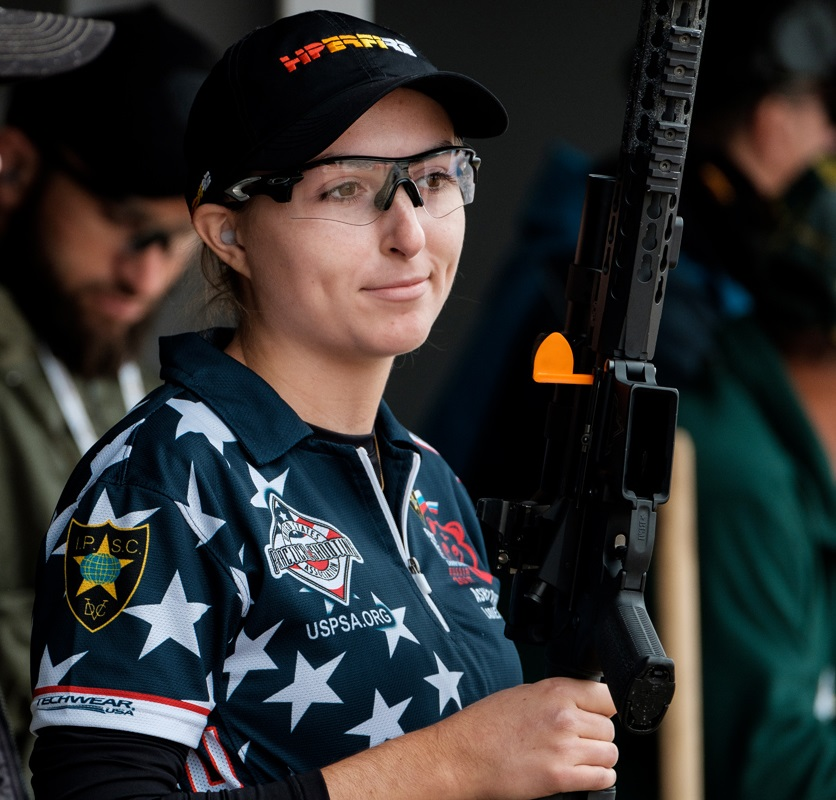
Ashley Rheuark at the 2017 IPSC Rifle World Shoot.

Year	Division	Gold	Silver	Bronze	Venue
1986		(Canada) Kerry Lathwell			World Shoot VII
1988		(United States) Debbie James	(United States) Judy Smith	(South Africa) Inez Behrendt	World Shoot VIII
1991		(United Kingdom) Collette Barnes	(South Africa) Chanatel Accone	(South Africa) Ursula Lund	1991 World Shoot
1993	Open	(United States) Kay Clark Miculek	(United Kingdom) Collette Barnes	(United States) Kippi Boykin	World Shoot X
1996	Open	(United States) Kay Clark Miculek	(Philippines) Mary Tan	(South Africa) Chantal Accone	World Shoot XI
1999	Open	(Philippines) Athena Lee	(Philippines) Mary Grace Tan	(South Africa) Chantal Tam	World Shoot XII
1999	Standard	(United States) Debbie Keehart			World Shoot XII
2002	Open	(Philippines) Kaye Cabalatungan	(Philippines) Athena Lee	(Austria) Gabriele Kraushofer	World Shoot XIII
2002	Standard	(United States) Sharon Zaffiro	(South Africa) Joey Fischer	(Czech Republic) Michaela Horejsi	World Shoot XIII
2002	Production	(United States) Debbie Keehart			World Shoot XIII
2005	Open	(Austria) Gabriele Kraushofer	(United States) Kay Clark Miculek	(Australia) Linda Blowers	World Shoot XIV
2005	Standard	(Germany) Petra Tutschke	(United States) Julie Golob	(Czech Republic) Michaela Horejsi	World Shoot XIV
2008	Open	(United States) Athena Lee	(Austria) Gabriele Kraushofer	(Slovakia) Katerina Sustrova	World Shoot XV
2008	Standard	(Australia) Claire Giles	(Philippines) Jannette Gonzaga	(Austria) Birgit Gruber	World Shoot XV
2008	Production	(Philippines) Ma. Inez F. Jorge	(Thailand) Oryza Shelley De Leon	(Philippines) Andrea Gasic	World Shoot XV
2011	Open	(Australia) Karla Blowers	(United States) Megan Francisco	(United States) Jessie Duff	World Shoot XVI
2011	Standard	(United States) Randi Rogers	(United States) Tori Nonaka	(United States) Lisa Munson	World Shoot XVI
2011	Production	(Russia) Maria Gushchina	(United States) Julie Golob	(United States) Sara Dunivin	World Shoot XVI
2014	Open	(Australia) Karla Blowers	(Czech Republic) Martina Sera	(United States) Kaci Cochran	World Shoot XVII
2014	Standard	(Norway) Hilde Nakling	(United States) Tori Nonaka	(United States) Randi Rogers	World Shoot XVII
2014	Production	(Russia) Maria Gushchina	(Switzerland) Christine Burkhalter	(United States) Julie Golob	World Shoot XVII
2014	Classic	(France) Anne Fonder	(Philippines) Leonora Darte	(Brazil) Bruna Mirandola	World Shoot XVII
2017	Open	(Australia) Karla Blowers	(United States) Jessie Duff	(United States) Kaci Lynn Cochran	World Shoot XVIII
2017	Standard	(Switzerland) Christine Burkhalter	(United States) Ashley Rheuark	(Norway) Hilde Nakling	World Shoot XVIII
2017	Production	(Russia) Maria Gushchina	(Italy) Violetta Boehm	(United States) Randi Rogers	World Shoot XVIII
2017	Classic	(United States) Julie Golob	(Serbia) Jelena Savkovic	(Philippines) Grace Tamayo	World Shoot XVIII
2017	Revolver	(Russia) Vera Treskova	(Russia) Olga Kuznetsova	(Russia) Daria Zharkova	World Shoot XVIII
2022	Production	(Italy) Camilla Almici	(France) Cyrielle Vivo	(Italy) Chiara Neviani	World Shoot XIX
2022	Open	(Indonesia) Sarah Ayu Tamaela	(United States) Jessie Harrison	(Philippines) Jessica Tampoco	World Shoot XIX
2022	Standard	(Philippines) Genesis Pible	(France) Margaux Nycz	(Denmark) Sissal Skaale	World Shoot XIX
2022	Production Optics	(United States) Morgan Leonhardt	(Thailand) Chanyanuch Perkyam	(Sweden) Cecilia Lindberg	World Shoot XIX
2022	Classic	(Thailand) Patcharin Innhom	(Philippines) Marly Martir	(Thailand) Andrea Gail Calupig	World Shoot XIX
2022	Production Optics Light	(Thailand) Nahathai Maleipan	(Hungary) Nikolett Hollosi	(Philippines) Lydia Cuyong	World Shoot XIX
2022	Revolver	(Thailand) Nicha Srinakarin	(Laos) Kongkham Bouasengphachanh	(Thailand) Parichart Booranasri	World Shoot XIX
2025	Standard	(France) Margaux Nycz	(Thailand) Kanyanat Prasertcharoensuk	(Thailand) Pattharathida Makaew	World Shoot XX
2025	Classic	(United States) Jalise Williams	(Thailand) Nannalin Luangprasert	(Philippines) Lenn lie Grace Onahon	World Shoot XX
2025	Production Optics	(United States) Justine Williams	(Sweden) Cecilia Lindberg	(Australia) Naomi Phegan	World Shoot XX
2025	Production	(Italy) Camilla Almici	(Czech Republic) Petra Nemcova	(Denmark) Sissal Skaale	World Shoot XX
2025	Open	(Italy) Denny Rossetto	(Philippines) Erin Mattea Micor	(Czech Republic) Martina Sera	World Shoot XX

=== Lady Senior category ===
Year	Division	Gold	Silver	Bronze	Venue
2025	Standard	(South Africa) Eurika Du Plooy	(Portugal) Elsa Joaquim	(Slovakia) Zuzana Botková	World Shoot XX
2025	Production Optics	(Italy) Barbara Balestrini	(Germany) Claudia Remek-Lentz	(South Africa) Janita Kruger	World Shoot XX
2025	Production	(Spain) Rosa Maria Domènech Mestres	(United States) Carina Randolph	(Canada) Lise Mahoney	World Shoot XX
2025	Open	(Austria) Margit Steurer	(Italy) Carina Trevisani	(Italy) Barbara Franchini	World Shoot XX

=== Junior category ===
Year	Division	Gold	Silver	Bronze	Venue
1990		(Australia) Suzy Ballantyne			World Shoot IX
1992		(South Africa) J.D. Sprague			Individual World Championship
1996	Open	(Philippines) Jeufro Lejano	(France) Eric Grauffel	(Philippines) Roger Dy	World Shoot XI
1999	Open	(France) Eric Grauffel	(United States) Max Michel	(Philippines) Stephen Hinojales	World Shoot XII
2002	Open	(United States) Chris Tilley	(Czech Republic) Martin Kamenicek Jr	(Spain) Jorge Ballesteros	World Shoot XIII
2002	Standard	(United States) Paul Clark Jnr	(Czech Republic) David Richtr	(Guatemala) Giocondo Granai	World Shoot XIII
2005	Open	(United States) Chris Tilley	(United States) BJ Norris	(United States) KC Eusebio	World Shoot XIV
2005	Standard	(Czech Republic) Zdenek Liehne	(Ecuador) Carlos Palma	(Czech Republic) Zdenek Svelha Jr	World Shoot XIV
2005	Production	(Czech Republic) Adam Tyc	(Ecuador) Galo Moreira	(Guatemala) Luis Gonzalez	World Shoot XIV
2008	Open	(United States) KC Eusebio	(United States) Brad Balsley	(United States) Shane Coley	World Shoot XV
2008	Standard	(Ecuador) Carlos Palma	(Italy) Paolo Montera	(Finland) Risto Hirvikallio	World Shoot XV
2008	Production	(Ecuador) Galo Moreira Icaza	(Argentina) Gustavo Liwko	(Slovakia) Andrej Hrnciarik	World Shoot XV
2011	Open	(United States) Shane Coley	(Australia) Rhys Arthur	(United States) Ben Thompson	World Shoot XVI
2011	Standard	(United States) Matthew Sweeney	(Italy) Davide Bergami	(Brazil) Victor Dalmeida Arruda	World Shoot XVI
2011	Production	(Slovakia) Andrej Hrnciarik	(Czech Republic) Pavel Torgashov	(Philippines) Diomari Ivan Tayag	World Shoot XVI
2014	Open	(Finland) Simo Partanen	(United States) Kincaid Ross	(Philippines) Edcel John Gino	World Shoot XVII
2014	Standard	(Philippines) Michael Ron Ligon	(Indonesia) Vincentius Djajadiningrat	(Brazil) Gabriel Barbosa	World Shoot XVII
2014	Production	(Russia) Pavel Torgashov	(United States) Jacob Hetherington	(United States) Jason Katz	World Shoot XVII
2017	Open	(Brazil) Mauro Kenji Murakami	(United States) Clement Caesar Ho	(Thailand) Dangdee Hongdalud	World Shoot XVIII
2017	Standard	(Philippines) Kahlil Adrian Viray	(Philippines) Rolly Nathaniel Tecson	(Brazil) Mario Batista Neto	World Shoot XVIII
2017	Production	(Russia) Nikita Nemykin	(France) Baptiste Felt	(Russia) Danila Pakhomov	World Shoot XVIII

=== Senior category ===
Year	Division	Gold	Silver	Bronze	Venue
1996	Open	(United States) Allan Zitta	(South Africa) Paul Bromfield	(United Kingdom) Martyn Speirs	World Shoot XI
2002	Open	(Czech Republic) Miroslav Kamenicek	(France) Alain Tarrade	(France) Philippe Gibert	World Shoot XIII
2002	Standard	(South Africa) Colin Amm	(Argentina) Ricardo Gentile	(Switzerland) Peter Kressibucher	World Shoot XIII
2002	Modified	(South Africa) Roger Stockbridge	(South Africa) Carlo Belletti	(South Africa) Dok Dokter	World Shoot XIII
2005	Open	(Czech Republic) Miroslav Kamenicek	(Canada) Frank Koch	(Jamaica) Anthony Johnson	World Shoot XIV
2005	Modified	(Italy) Mario Riillo	(Czech Republic) Vaclav Martinek	(Ecuador) Roberto Gilbert	World Shoot XIV
2005	Standard	(Italy) Esterino Magli	(Argentina) Ricardo Gentile	(Switzerland) Peter Kressibucher	World Shoot XIV
2005	Production	(Philippines) Daniel Torrevillas	(United States) John Michael France	(Slovakia) Štefan Ács	World Shoot XIV
2005	Revolver	(United States) Jerry Miculek	(Czech Republic) Lumir Safranek	(United States) Patrick Sweeney	World Shoot XIV
2008	Open	(Italy) Mario Riillo	(Czech Republic) Miroslav Kamenicek	(France) Thierry Obriot	World Shoot XV
2008	Modified	(Italy) Gavino Mura	(Hong Kong) Kwok Kwong Tong	(Spain) Antonio Gracia Infante	World Shoot XV
2008	Standard	(Italy) Esterino Magli	(Brazil) Lucimar Oliveira	(Philippines) Marlon G. Valencia	World Shoot XV
2008	Production	(Philippines) Wilfredo Div Anglo	(Philippines) Daniel Torrevillas	(South Africa) Robert Hopper	World Shoot XV
2008	Revolver	(Czech Republic) Zdenek Nemecek	(Czech Republic) Lumir Safranek	(Thailand) Tavesak Singsomboon	World Shoot XV
2011	Open	(Switzerland) Patrik Schneider	(South Africa) Hubert Thomas Montgomery	(Austria) Guenther Weber	World Shoot XVI
2011	Modified	(United States) Rob Leatham	(United States) Michael Voigt	(Germany) Juergen Flass	World Shoot XVI
2011	Standard	(Brazil) Lucimar Domingues Oliveira	(Austria) Gottfried Post	(Italy) Salvatore Simula	World Shoot XVI
2011	Production	(Switzerland) Peter Heller	(Philippines) Wilfredo Anglo	(Italy) Francesco Servodio	World Shoot XVI
2011	Revolver	(United States) Jerry Miculek	(Czech Republic) Zdeněk Němeček	(Austria) Hermann Kirchweger	World Shoot XVI
2014	Open	(United States) Michael Voigt	(Italy) Paolo Andrea Ravizzini	(Philippines) Nelson Uygongco	World Shoot XVII
2014	Standard	(United States) Emmanuel Bragg	(Italy) Adriano Santarcangelo	(United States) Ron Avery	World Shoot XVII
2014	Production	(United States) Frank Garcia	(Brazil) Guga Ribas	(United States) Gilbert Perez	World Shoot XVII
2014	Classic	(United States) Rob Leatham	(United States) Todd Jarrett	(France) Michel Nestolat	World Shoot XVII
2014	Revolver	(Austria) Hermann Kirchweger	(Czech Republic) Zdenek Nemecek	(United States) Jess Christensen	World Shoot XVII
2017	Open	(Belgium) Frank Witters	(Spain) Jose Zanon Blasco	(Italy) Daniele Barbizzi	World Shoot XVIII
2017	Standard	(United States) Emanuel Bragg	(Austria) Reinhard Handl	(Italy) Adriano Ciro Santarcangelo	World Shoot XVIII
2017	Production	(Slovakia) Jan Palka	(United States) Frank William Garcia	(United States) Angus Hobdell	World Shoot XVIII
2017	Classic	(Italy) Edoardo Buticchi	(Thailand) Narongsak Kaewmuangpet	(Italy) Guido Ciccarelli	World Shoot XVIII
2017	Revolver	(Brazil) Moacir de Azevedo	(Germany) Markus Schneider	(Sweden) Olof Lindskog	World Shoot XVIII

=== Super Senior category ===
Year	Division	Gold	Silver	Bronze	Venue
2008	Open	(France) Philippe Gibert	(France) Alain Tarrade	(South Africa) Carlo Belletti	World Shoot XV
2008	Standard	(Germany) Max Sen. Wiegand	(Brazil) Antonio Vaghi	(United States) Paul Clark	World Shoot XV
2008	Production	(Spain) Teodoro Rios Marrero	(Australia) Colin Smith	(Australia) Bob Sully	World Shoot XV
2011	Open	(Canada) Michael Auger	(Brazil) Jose Josias Lucena Ferreira	(Czech Republic) Miroslav Kamenicek	World Shoot XVI
2011	Standard	(Switzerland) Peter Kressibucher	(Canada) Robbin Hudson	(Austria) Hubert Muhlbacher	World Shoot XVI
2011	Production	(Germany) Max Wiegand	(United Kingdom) Bob Dunkley	(South Africa) Gerrit Dokter	World Shoot XVI
2014	Open	(France) Thierry Obriot	(Italy) Giovanni Furio Liberti	(Jamaica) Anthony Johnson	World Shoot XVII
2014	Standard	(Italy) Esterino Magli	(United States) Johnny Brister	(Argentina) Ricardo Gentile	World Shoot XVII
2014	Production	(Czech Republic) Miroslav Kamenicek	(Brazil) Mauro Thompson	(Philippines) Edwin Gotamco	World Shoot XVII
2014	Classic	(Philippines) Daniel Torrevillas	(United Kingdom) Robert Edward Dunkley	(Canada) Randy Fisher	World Shoot XVII
2014	Revolver	(United States) Aysen Elliot	(Czech Republic) Lumir Safranek	(United States) Tony Hyatt	World Shoot XVII
2017	Open	(France) Thierry Obriot	(Thailand) Wat Srijinta-Angkul	(France) Philippe Gibert	World Shoot XVIII
2017	Standard	(Italy) Esterino Magli	(Brazil) Lucimar Domingues Oliveira	(Philippines) Israelito Pible	World Shoot XVIII
2017	Production	(Germany) Heribert Bettermann	(South Africa) Rob Hopper	(Germany) Max Wiegand	World Shoot XVIII
2017	Classic	(France) Joel Gerard	(Canada) Randy Fisher	(Denmark) Gert Erling Hansen	World Shoot XVIII

== Teams ==
Teams can consist of up to four athletes, with the three highest individual scores counting for the team results.

=== Overall teams ===
Year	Division	Gold	Silver	Bronze	Venue
1975					World Shoot I
1976					World Shoot II
1977		Rhodesia; 100.00 % 8776.064 points	United States; 99.53 % 8735.054 points	South Africa; 88.98 % 7808.542 points	World Shoot III
1979					World Shoot IV
1981					World Shoot V
1983		United States; 100.00 %			World Shoot VI
1986					World Shoot VII
1988		United States; 100.00 %	Austria	United Kingdom	World Shoot VIII
1990		United States			World Shoot IX
1993	Open	United States; 100.00 % 10574.2874 points	South Africa; 89.09 % 9420.5502 points	United Kingdom; 87.59 % 9261.8333 points	World Shoot X
1996	Open				World Shoot XI
1999	Open				World Shoot XII
2002	Open				World Shoot XIII
2002	Standard	(United States); 100.00 % 8471.4458 points: Rob Leatham, Michael Voigt, Ron Avery, Phil Strader	South Africa; 91.17 % 7723.0008 points: Fabian Scott, Nick du Plessis, Gary Haltmann, Paul van Wyk	Italy; 87.88 % 7444.9984 points: Adriano Ciro Santarcangel, Guido Ciccarelli, Valter Tranquilli, Esterino Magli (DQ)	World Shoot XIII
2005	Open				World Shoot XIV
2008	Revolver	Italy; 100.00 % 6887.00 points: Andrea Todeschini, Igor Rosa Brusin, Luca Ricciardi, Claudio Zambonin			World Shoot XV
2011	Open				World Shoot XVI
2014	Open	United States; 100.00 % 6544.1614 points: Max Michel, Shane Coley, KC Eusebio, Chris Tilley	Czech Republic; 93.79 % 6137.5093 points: Martin Kamenicek, Miroslav Havlicek, Zdenek Henes	Australia; 93.60 % 6125.3867 points: Brodie McIntosh, Nick Kapor, Gareth Graham, David McConachie	World Shoot XVII
2014	Standard	United States; 100.00 % 6685.2494 points: Nils Jonasson, Bob Vogel, Dave Sevigny, Emanuel Bragg	Italy; 91.74 % 6132.9641 points: Cosimo Panetta, Gregorio Tassone, Max Bragagnolo, Giulio Del Rosario	Spain; 87.51 % 5850.5001 points: Juan Carlos Jaime Diaz, Gorka Ibanez, Jesus Ferreiro, David Davite	World Shoot XVII
2014	Production	United States; 100.00 % 6679.5259 points: Simon Racaza, Ben Stoeger, Matthew Mink	Czechia; 94.53 % 6313.8761 points: Robin Sebo, Zdenek Liehne, Miroslav Zapletal, Michal Stepan	France; 90.49 % 6044.1766 points: Eric Grauffel, Louis Adrien Guichard, Mathieu Lavergne, Baptiste Felt	World Shoot XVII
2014	Classic	United States; 100.00 % 6346.8120 points: Rob Leatham, Todd Jarrett, Gary Byerly, Keith Dilworth	Philippines; 99.95 % 6343.9388 points: Edward Rivera, Wilfredo Jr Martin, Jerome Morales, William Magalong	Italy; 96.47 % 6122.8449 points: Edoardo Buticchi, Roberto Vezzoli, Mauro Di Prospero, Mario Piccioni	World Shoot XVII
2014	Revolver	United States; 100.00 % 6184.8829 points: Josh Lentz, David Olhasso, Cliff Walsh, Elliot Aysen	Austria; 96.13 % 5945.4234 points: Gerald Reiter, Hermann Kirchweger, Reinhard Handl, Robert Kroiss	Brazil; 91.93 % 5685.5642 points: Moacyr Azevedo, Wagner Almeida, Daniel Polverini, Rogerio Rosas	World Shoot XVII

=== Lady teams ===
Year	Division	Gold	Silver	Bronze	Venue
1975					World Shoot I
1976					World Shoot II
1977					World Shoot III
1979					World Shoot IV
1981					World Shoot V
1983					World Shoot VI
1986					World Shoot VII
1988					World Shoot VIII
1990					World Shoot IX
1993	Open	United States; 100.00 % 4738.5045 points	United Kingdom; 94.30 % 4468.4663 points	South Africa; 92.06 % 4362.2500 points	World Shoot X
1996	Open				World Shoot XI
1999	Open				World Shoot XII
2002	Open				World Shoot XIII
2002	Standard	United States; 100.00 %			World Shoot XIII
2005	Open				World Shoot XIV
2008	Open				World Shoot XV
2011	Open				World Shoot XVI
2014	Open				World Shoot XVII

== See also ==
- IPSC Rifle World Shoots
- IPSC Shotgun World Shoots
- IPSC Action Air World Shoots
- List of world sports championships
