= Todd Jarrett =

American sports shooter

Medal record
IPSC
Representing United States
IPSC Handgun World Shoot
Gold medal – first place	1996 Brasilia	Open
Silver medal – second place	1999 Cebu	Open
Silver medal – second place	2002 Pietersburg	Open
Silver medal – second place	2005 Guayaquil	Open
Bronze medal – third place	2014 Frostproof	Classic
Silver medal – second place	2014 Frostproof	Classic Senior
IPSC US Handgun Championship
Gold medal – first place	1991
Silver medal – second place	1993	Open
Silver medal – second place	1996	Open
Gold medal – first place	1997	Open
Gold medal – first place	1998	Open
Bronze medal – third place	2009	Standard
Gold medal – first place	2012 Frostproof	Classic
Gold medal – first place	2013 Frostproof	Classic

Todd Jarrett is an American competitive shooter, firearms instructor, and filmmaker. He has both national and World titles within practical shooting, holding four world titles, nine national titles and has won more than 50 US Area championships, as well as many other action shooting events. Jarrett is the only USPSA Triple Crown Winner and holds four USPSA National titles - Open, Limited, Production and Limited-10. Jarrett lives in Virginia.

In an interview published by an Australian IPSC shooting magazine, Jarrett stated: "I got started in competition in 1983, shooting bowling pins. In 1984, I started shooting IPSC on Friday nights at an indoor range in Richmond, Va., with some co-workers." Another published interview mentioned that between 1988 and 2001 he shot about 1.7 million rounds during practice. "I had a gun in my hand for two hours every day for 10 years to develop my skill level. Now it's not so much practice, but more of a maintenance thing. I wasted the first million rounds just learning how to shoot."

In 2010, Jarrett announced plans to start his own 1911 manufacturing company, Strike Force Manufacturing.

== Merits ==
- 1996 IPSC World Champion, Open Division
- 6 time USPSA Handgun Nationals Open Champion (1991, 1997, 1998, 2000, 2002 and 2003)
- 1997 USPSA Handgun Nationals Limited Champion
- 2003 USPSA Handgun Nationals Limited-10 Champion
- 2003 USPSA Handgun Nationals Production Champion
- 1998 IPSC Pan-American Handgun Championship winner
- 4 time Steel Challenge Limited World Champion (1998, 2003, 2005 and 2007)
- 2008 German Open Production Champion

Jarrett has also had more than 100 Area and Sectional Championship wins

== Endorsements ==
Jarrett has been sponsored by, and is a frequent spokesman and celebrity shooter for, Para-Ordnance (a pistol maker), Dawson Precision (a M1911-series pistol maker), Crimson Trace (a pistol laser sight maker), C-More (an optical firearms sight maker), and Blackhawk Products Group (a maker of tactical field gear and gun accessories).

== Videos ==
- Todd Jarrett's Instructional Video (VHS)
- Blackhawk's Pro-Tips with Todd Jarrett Season 1 (DVD)

Many of Jarrett's shorter pistol shooting instructional clips are popular on sites such as YouTube, LiveVideo, DownRangeTV, and Google Video.

== Family ==
Todd Jarrett is the cousin of former NASCAR racing driver (and now racing commentator) Dale Jarrett.

== See also ==
- Bowling pin shooting
- IDPA
- Steel Challenge
- USPSA
