= 1983 IPSC Handgun World Shoot =

International shooting tournament

1983 IPSC Handgun World Shoot VI
- Location: Virginia, United States

Medalists
gold medal	(United States) Rob Leatham
silver medal	(United States) John Shaw
bronze medal	(United States) Mike Plaxco

The 1983 IPSC Handgun World Shoot VI held in Virginia, United States, was the sixth IPSC Handgun World Shoot, and was won by Rob Leatham of USA, who had started shooting as a teenager.

== Champions ==
Individual

Overall	Competitor	Points	Percent
Gold	(United States) Rob Leatham		100.00%
Silver	(United States) John Shaw		%
Bronze	(United States) Mike Plaxco		%
4th	(United States) Ross Carter Harrison		%
5th	(United States) Rick Castelow Madison		%
6th	(United States) Tom Campbell		%
7th	(United States) Ross Seyfried		%
8th	(United States) John Dixon		%
9th	(United States) Brian Enos		%
10th	(United States) Mike Dalton		%

Teams

Overall	Country	Points	Percent	Team members
Gold	United States		100.00%	Rob Leatham, Tom Campbell, Mike Plaxco, Brian Enos, Bill Wilson, Ross Seyfried (Team Captain)
Silver			%	
Bronze			%	
4th			%	
5th			%	
6th			%	

== See also ==
- IPSC Rifle World Shoots
- IPSC Shotgun World Shoot
- IPSC Action Air World Shoot
