= Michael Voigt =

Medal record
IPSC
Representing United States
IPSC Handgun World Shoot
| Bronze medal – third place | 1993 Bisley | Open |
| Gold medal – first place | 1999 Cebu | Standard |
| Silver medal – second place | 2002 Pietersburg | Standard |
| Bronze medal – third place | 2008 Bali | Modified |
| Silver medal – second place | 2011 Rhodes | Modified |
| Gold medal – first place | 2014 Frostproof | Open Senior |
IPSC US Handgun Championship
| Gold medal – first place | 2012 Frostproof | Open Senior |
| Gold medal – first place | 2013 Frostproof | Open Senior |
IPSC Pan-American Shotgun Championship
| Gold medal – first place | 2010 Kentucky | Open |

Michael Paul Voigt (September 23, 1958 – March 24, 2018) was president of the United States Practical Shooting Association (USPSA) from 2000 to 2012.

He later worked for Surefire LLC in the Suppressor R&D division, in addition to working with Safariland R&D.

Michael has won numerous world and national titles in handgun, shotgun, rifle, and multigun through over 30 years of competition. A few of these titles include the IPSC World Championship Individual titles 3 times, IPSC World Team Championship 7 times, IPSC Continental Shotgun 2 times, IPSC Continental handgun 2 times, International Tactical Rifle Championship 5 times and USPSA multi-gun 14 times.

Michael Voigt was influential in the formation of Strayer Voigt Inc and their line of Infinity Firearms of modular wide-frame 1911s, also called 2011s. Strayer-Voigt, Inc. was started in June 1994 when its founder Sandy Strayer left STI International Inc to form his own company, and then joined forces with Michael Voigt who contributed both as a professional shooter and gunsmith.

Michael died in 2018 from cancer.
