= 2002 IPSC Handgun World Shoot =

International shooting tournament

2002 IPSC Handgun World Shoot XIII
- Official logo of the 2002 IPSC Handgun World Shoot
- Location: Pietersburg, South Africa
- Dates: Monday 16. to Friday 20. September 2002
- Competitors: 781 from 45 nations

Medalists
gold medal	Open (Largest Division) (France) Eric Grauffel
silver medal	(United States) Todd Jarrett
bronze medal	(Australia) Brodie McIntosh

The 2002 IPSC Handgun World Shoot XIII held in Pietersburg, South Africa was the 13th IPSC Handgun World Shoot.

== Champions ==
=== Open ===
The Open division had the largest participation with 339 competitors (43.4 %).

Individual

Overall	Competitor	Points	Overall Match Percent	
Gold	(France) Eric Grauffel	2982.9601	100.00%	
Silver	(United States) Todd Jarrett	2870.5695	96.23%	
Bronze	(Australia) Brodie McIntosh	2870.5689	96.23%	
4th	(United States) Jerry Barnhart	2816.7656	94.43%	
5th	(Israel) Saul Kirsch	2804.0491	94.00%	
6th	(United States) Simon Racaza	2782.0869	93.27%	
7th	(United States) Jojo Vidanes	2764.3787	92.67%	
8th	(United States) Travis Tomasie	2712.8931	90.95%	
9th	(Australia) Errol Thomas	2679.4890	89.83%	
10th	(United States) Max Michel	2676.6975	89.73%	
Lady	Competitor	Points	Overall percent	Category percent
Gold	(Philippines) Kaye Cabalatungan	2238.2812	75.04%	100.00%
Silver	(Philippines) Athena Lee	2226.4847	74.64%	99.47%
Bronze	(Austria) Gabriele Kraushofer	2149.8261	72.07%	96.05%
Junior	Competitor	Points	Overall percent	Category percent
Gold	(United States) Chris Tilley	2674.9299	89.67%	100.00%
Silver	(Czech Republic) Martin Kamenicek Jr	2634.3995	88.31%	98.48%
Bronze	(Spain) Jorge Ballesteros	2510.9841	84.18%	93.87%
Senior	Competitor	Points	Overall percent	Category percent
Gold	(Czech Republic) Miroslav Kamenicek	2260.8201	75.79%	100.00%
Silver	(France) Alain Tarrade	2209.3896	74.07%	97.73%
Bronze	(France) Philippe Gibert	2173.9580	72.88%	96.16%

Teams

Overall	Country	Points	Percent	Team members
Gold	United States	8400.2282	100.00%	Todd Jarrett, Jerry Barnhart, Travis Tomasie, Max Michel
Silver	Australia	8116.9124	96.63%	Brodie McIntosh, Errol Thomas, David Soldini, Ivan Rehlicki
Bronze	France	8082.6277	96.22%	Eric Grauffel, Eddy Testa, Herve Charlet, Stephane Quertinier
Lady	Country	Points	Percent	Team members
Gold	Philippines	6508.5546	100.00%	Kaye Cabalatungan, Athena Lee, MaryGrace Tan, Amanda Kangleon
Silver	United States	6232.1925	95.75%	Julie Goloski, Kay Miculek, Kim Stroud, Lisa Munson
Bronze	South Africa	6032.1537	92.68%	Susan Kriel, Leani Canham, Chantal Tam, Hanlie Montgomery

=== Modified ===
The Modified division had 55 competitors (7.0 %).

Individual

Overall	Competitor	Points	Overall Match Percent	
Gold	(South Africa) Austen Stockbridge	2866.3164	100.00%	
Silver	(Philippines) Jeufro Lejano	2765.5546	96.48%	
Bronze	(Italy) Edoardo Buticchi	2755.3910	96.13%	
4th	(Brazil) Guga Ribas	2717.4754	94.81%	
5th	(Philippines) Jerome Morales	2707.4205	94.46%	
6th	(Czech Republic) Jiri Lelic	2638.2928	92.04%	
7th	(Czech Republic) Vaclav Martinek	2630.4941	91.77%	
8th	(Italy) Tullio Silvera	2629.7241	91.75%	
9th	(Czech Republic) Josef Rakusan	2534.6017	88.43%	
10th	(South Africa) Justin Naidoo	2514.7360	87.73%	
Senior	Competitor	Points	Overall percent	Category percent
Gold	(South Africa) Roger Stockbridge	2506.8650	87.46%	100.00%
Silver	(South Africa) Carlo Belletti	2373.4245	82.80%	94.68%
Bronze	(South Africa) Dok Dokter	2273.0853	79.30%	90.67%

Teams

Place	Country	Points	Percent	Team members
Gold	Philippines	7896.4674	100.00%	Jeufro Lejano, Jerome Morales, Daniel Torrevillas, Roland Tan
Silver	South Africa	7882.3647	99.82%	Austen Stockbridge, Justin Naidoo, Roger Stockbridge, Guy Stockbridge
Bronze	Czech Republic	7797.7549	98.75%	Jiri Lelic, Vaclav Martinek, Josef Rakusan, Pavel Jasansky

=== Standard ===
The Standard division had the second largest participation with 306 competitors (39.2 %).

Individual

Overall	Competitor	Points	Overall Match Percent	
Gold	(United States) Rob Leatham	2915.3569	100.00%	
Silver	(United States) Michael Voigt	2841.2235	97.46%	
Bronze	(United States) Ron Avery	2714.8654	93.12%	
4th	(United States) Phil Strader	2700.3509	92.63%	
5th	(Guatemala) Estuardo Gomez	2668.8837	91.55%	
6th	(South Africa) Fabian Scott	2636.8531	90.45%	
7th	(United States) Frank Garcia	2628.7556	90.17%	
8th	(Spain) Juan Carlos Jaime	2623.1232	89.98%	
9th	(South Africa) Nick du Plessis	2610.2408	89.53%	
10th	(Germany) Oliver Damm	2577.0380	88.40%	
Lady	Competitor	Points	Overall percent	Category percent
Gold	(United States) Sharon Zaffiro	1749.5259	60.01%	100.00%
Silver	(South Africa) Joey Fischer	1680.4578	57.64%	96.05%
Bronze	(Czech Republic) Michaela Horejsi	1665.6432	57.13%	95.21%
Junior	Competitor	Points	Overall percent	Category percent
Gold	(United States) Paul Clark Jnr	2227.0878	76.39%	100.00%
Silver	(Czech Republic) David Richtr	2065.3341	70.84%	92.74%
Bronze	(Guatemala) Giocondo Granai	2027.8956	69.56%	91.06%
Senior	Competitor	Points	Overall percent	Category percent
Gold	(South Africa) Colin Amm	2367.3300	81.20%	100.00%
Silver	(Argentina) Ricardo Gentile	2262.8289	77.62%	95.59%
Bronze	(Switzerland) Peter Kressibucher	2212.3121	75.88%	93.45%
Super Senior	Competitor	Points	Overall percent	Category percent
Gold	(Zimbabwe) John Goddard	1593.9370	54.67%	100.00%
Silver	(Norway) Per Trovik	1591.7460	54.60%	99.86%
Bronze	(United States) Paul Clark Snr	1477.5096	50.68%	92.70%

Teams

Place	Country	Points	Percent	Team members
Gold	United States	8471.4458	100.00%	Rob Leatham, Michael Voigt, Ron Avery, Phil Strader
Silver	South Africa	7723.0008	91.17%	Fabian Scott, Nick du Plessis, Gary Haltmann, Paul van Wyk
Bronze	Italy	7444.9984	87.88%	Adriano Ciro Santarcangel, Guido Ciccarelli, Valter Tranquilli, Esterino Magli

=== Production ===
The Production division had 56 competitors (7.2 %).

Individual

Overall	Competitor	Points	Overall Match Percent
Gold	(United States) David Sevigny	2861.8622	100.00%
Silver	(Italy) Paul Brocanelli	2799.6130	97.82%
Bronze	(Uruguay) Guillermo Jude	2783.7473	97.27%
4th	(Italy) Giovanni Zuccolo	2675.9473	93.50%
5th	(Czech Republic) Jan Knapp	2649.6260	92.58%
6th	(Italy) Stefano Iacomini	2643.2018	92.36%
7th	(United States) Bruce Gray	2641.2583	92.29%
8th	(Philippines) Nelson Uygongco	2637.4374	92.16%
9th	(South Africa) MH Christie	2621.6565	91.61%
10th	(United States) Ernest Langdon	2595.9879	90.71%

Teams

Place	Country	Points	Percent	Team members
Gold	Italy	8118.7621	100.00%	Paul Brocanelli, Giovanni Zuccolo, Stefano Iacomini, Mario Piccioni
Silver	United States	8099.1084	99.76%	David Sevigny, Bruce Gray, Ernest Langdon, John Flentz
Bronze	South Africa	7785.8592	95.90%	MH Christie, Zirk Pansegrouw, Eugene Lurie, Jonathan Fouche

=== Revolver ===
The Revolver division had 25 competitors (3.2 %).

Individual

Overall	Competitor	Points	Overall Match Percent
Gold	(United States) Jerry Miculek	3090.4017	100.00%
Silver	(Switzerland) Daniel Roch	2616.0459	84.65%
Bronze	(Italy) Alain Marco Della Savia	2486.7063	80.47%
4th	(Brazil) Manoel Lucio	2436.5182	78.84%
5th	(Brazil) Yamacuchi Yukio	2383.4335	77.12%
6th	(Sweden) Ivar Edfeldt	2327.3760	75.31%
7th	(Germany) Dietmar Rauer	2306.2959	74.63%
8th	(Czech Republic) Lumir Safranek	2302.3061	74.50%
9th	(Philippines) Phillipp Chua	2295.4627	74.28%
10th	(Brazil) Fernando Becker	2287.7090	74.03%

Teams

Place	Country	Points	Percent	Team members
Gold	Brazil	7107.6607	100.00%	Manoel Lucio, Yamacuchi Yukio, Fernando Becker, Rogerio Rosas
Silver	Switzerland	6977.3462	98.17%	Daniel Roch, Wheelgunner Reich, Daniel Waldmann, Marwan Itani
Bronze	Germany	6732.9625	94.73%	Dietmar Rauer, Christian Kniep, Thomas Knoll, Gunther Knaus

== See also ==
- IPSC Rifle World Shoots
- IPSC Shotgun World Shoot
- IPSC Action Air World Shoot
