= David Westerhout =

Athlete and shooter (born 1936)

Personal information
- Nationality: British (English)/ Zimbabwean
- Born: 20 May 1936 Epping, Essex, England

Sport
- Sport: Athletics sports shooter
- Club: London University; Woodford Green AC

David I Westerhout (born 1936) is a former athlete who competed for England and a sports shooter who competed for Zimbabwe.

== Biography ==
Westerhout was born in Epping, Essex, England and was a member of the London University and Woodford Green AC clubs.

He represented the England athletics team in the 440 yards hurdles at the 1958 British Empire and Commonwealth Games in Cardiff, Wales. He was a member of Woodford Green Athletics Club and headed the UK junior rankings for the javelin in 1954.

Westerhout changed sports and took up pistol shooting. He won the World Combat Pistol Championships in 1977 and was voted Rhodesia Sportsman of the Year. In 1980 he competed for Zimbabwe in the Mixed 25 metre rapid fire pistol at the 1980 Summer Olympics in Moscow.

During 1959 he qualified as an optometrist and emigrated to Southern Rhodesia. In the 1970s he served in the Special Forces Unit of the Rhodesian Army.
