= Thailand Practical Shooting Association =

Organization

- สมาคมกีฬายิงปืนรณยุทธแห่งประเทศไทย
- Formation: 1986
- President: Pat Steiner
- Parent organization: International Practical Shooting Confederation
- Website: ipscthailand.com

Thailand Practical Shooting Association (THPSA) (สมาคมกีฬายิงปืนรณยุทธแห่งประเทศไทย) is the Thai association for practical shooting under the International Practical Shooting Confederation.
