= KC Eusebio =

Medal record
IPSC
Representing United States
IPSC Handgun World Shoot
Bronze medal – third place	2005 Guayaquil	Open Junior
Silver medal – second place	2008 Bali	Open
Gold medal – first place	2008 Bali	Open Junior
Bronze medal – third place	2011 Rhodes	Open
IPSC US Handgun Championship
Gold medal – first place	2015 Frostproof	Open
Gold medal – first place	2017 Frostproof	Open

KC Eusebio is an IPSC/ USPSA and Steel Challenge action shooting competitor from the US featured on the Hot Shots TV-series.

== Merits ==
- Youngest USPSA Master at the Age of 10
- Youngest USPSA Grandmaster at the Age of 12
- 4 time Open World Steel Challenge Speed Shooting Champion
- 4 time Open U.S. National Steel Challenge Speed Shooting Champion
- Owns 5 Steel Challenge World Speed Shooting Records
- 2008 IPSC Handgun World Shoot Open division Junior category winner
- 2010 USPSA Handgun Nationals Open Champion
- 2013 IPSC Australasia Handgun Championship winner
- 2013 European Steel Challenge Speed Shooting Champion
