= Rob Leatham =

American sport shooter (born 1961)

Robert Jennings Leatham
Personal information
- Born: 27 January 1961 (age 65)
Medal record
IPSC
Representing United States
IPSC Handgun World Shoot
Gold medal – first place	1983 Virginia
Gold medal – first place	1986 Florida
Gold medal – first place	1988 Caracas	Open
Gold medal – first place	2002 Pietersburg	Standard
Gold medal – first place	2005 Guayaquil	Standard
Bronze medal – third place	2011 Rhodes	Modified
Gold medal – first place	2014 Frostproof	Classic
IPSC US Handgun Championship
Gold medal – first place	1983
Gold medal – first place	1984
Gold medal – first place	1985
Gold medal – first place	1986
Gold medal – first place	1987
Gold medal – first place	1988
Gold medal – first place	1989
Silver medal – second place	1990
Silver medal – second place	1992
Bronze medal – third place	1994	Open
Gold medal – first place	1995	Open
Gold medal – first place	2016 Frostproof	Classic

Robert Jennings Leatham (born January 27, 1961, in Mesa, Arizona) is a professional shooter who is a 24-time USPSA National champion and 7-time International Practical Shooting Confederation (IPSC) World Champion.

== Biography ==
On Leatham's twelfth birthday, he received his first gun. His family surprised him with a new Smith & Wesson Model 34 revolver on one of their trips to shoot in the desert.

He continued desert shooting throughout his teenage years and became involved in other sports such as basketball.

=== Competition shooting ===
Leatham's first competition took place in the late 1970s at a night shoot at the Mesa Police Department range. He shot a Smith & Wesson Model 27 revolver with a 6-inch barrel loaded with 200-grain round-nose bullets that Leatham loaded himself, including a custom holster made by local leather worker, Jess Bird, who had built holsters for Leatham's father for years. Leatham finished third revolver behind Mike Henry and Charlie Mills and cites this competition for causing his addiction to competitive shooting.

He invented the Modern Isosceles shooting stance in the 1980s. A few years later he began shooting the 9x25 dillon handgun round and brought that cartridge into the mainstream.

Leatham first shot the Steel Challenge and The Bianchi Cup in 1982. In 1985, he won the Triple Crown of practical pistol shooting: the IPSC US Nationals, the Bianchi Cup and the Steel Challenge. He is the only competitor to ever win all three matches in the same year.

In 1989, he was offered a major contract with Springfield Armory, Inc. that enabled him to become a full-time, professional shooter. Since that time, Leatham has been practicing, competing, and conducting live-fire demonstrations for sponsors around the world.

=== Personal life ===
Leatham married fellow Team Springfield member Kippi Boykin, a three-time USPSA National Champion. They have one daughter together, Patience Leatham, and Leatham has 2 sons, Robert and Thomas, from a previous marriage.

== Titles ==
- 24-Time USPSA National Champion: 1983–1986, 1988, 1989, 1994, 1995, 1998, 2000, 2001, 2002 (Limited), 2002 (Limited-10), 2003, 2004, 2005, 2006 (Single-Stack and Production), 2007 (Single-Stack and Limited), 2008 (Single-Stack), 2009 (Single-Stack), 2010 (Single-Stack)
- 6-Time IPSC World Champion as a member of 7-time winning "Team USA":
  - 1983 - Virginia, US
  - 1986 - Florida, US
  - 1988 - Caracas, Venezuela,
  - 2002 - Pietersburg, South Africa
  - 2005 - Guayaquil, Ecuador
  - 2014 - Florida, US (Classic Division)
- 16-Time Single Stack Classic Champion: 1995–2010
- 7-Time Steel Challenge Champion: 1985, 1997, 1998, 2001, 2002 (Limited), 2002 (Open), 2009 (Production)
- 6-Time IDPA Custom Defensive Pistol (CDP) National Champion: 1997, 1998, 2000, 2001, 2002, 2004
- 7-Time NRA Bianchi Cup Champion: 1985, 2000, 2002, 2004, 2005, 2006, 2007, 2009
- 3-Time American Handgunner World Shootoff Champion: 1996, 2003, 2004
- Triple Crown Winner: 1985 (Bianchi Cup, Steel Challenge, and the IPSC/USPSA Nationals) - Leatham is the only person to ever achieve this
- Captain, Team Springfield: Since its inception in 1985

== See also ==
- Brian Enos
- Ron Avery
