= Brodie McIntosh =

Personal information
- Born: 16 July 1974 (age 52)
Medal record
IPSC
Representing Australia
IPSC Handgun World Shoot
Bronze medal – third place	2002 Pietersburg	Open
Bronze medal – third place	2014 Frostproof	Open

Brodie McIntosh (born 16 July 1974) is an IPSC competitor from Australia who took bronze in the 2002 and 2014 World Shoot. He has also won the Australian Handgun Championship 25 times.
