= Extreme Euro Open =

- Nickname: EEO
- Founded: 2008
- Type: IPSC level 3
- Location: Czech Republic
- Website: https://www.worldextremecup.com

The Extreme Euro Open is an IPSC level 3 shooting competition held annually in June at the Hodonice shooting range near the town Znojmo in the South Moravian Region of the Czech Republic. The match is organized by the company Extreme Gun Group, Ltd. and the Extreme Squad shooting club.

The match is divided into a Pre and Main Match, where the Pre Match is for the Range Officers later working at the Main Match as well as representatives of the match sponsors. The Main Match lasts three days (Thursday, Friday and Saturday), and is divided into morning and afternoon shifts. On Sunday, the best shooters from the Main Match vie for the Shoot-Off, which was changed to the Super Six format in 2015. Then the six best shooters from the Main Match in each division and some categories compete in an elimination round across three stages. The match is finished with an award ceremony.

Lubor Novak from the Czech Republic is the Match Director and founder of the match, and Wieslaw Geno Sioda from Poland is Stats Director. Since 2013, Johann Kurz has been the Range Master.

The match is part of the WORLD EXTREME CUP, IPSC level 3 matches series. The matches took place in the Czech Republic, Russia, Thailand, Poland, Denmark and USA.

Spin-off in smaller version match called EXTREME CHALLENGE takes place in Slovakia and Montenegro.

The shooting competition in 2020 was postponed to year 2021. The 12th Extreme Euro Open 2021 took place under strict anti-pandemic measures. Even so, 482 shooters from 32 countries took part in this match. The 2022 official results list is stated 643 sports shooters. In 2023, 730 shooters from 40 countries took part in the match. In 2024, a total of 799 shooters shot the match 15th CZ EXTREME EURO OPEN 2024. The 16th edition of the CZ EXTREME EURO OPEN 2025 competition was attended by a total of 765 shooters from 47 countries around the world, and the OPTICS division was included for the first time. The competition was also the IPSC Czech Handgun Championship for 2025. In 2026, out of a total of 1097 registered for the competition, the official results included 735 shooters from more than 50 countries around the world.

== Winners ==
Year	Division	Gold	Silver	Bronze
2008	Open	(France) Eric Grauffel	(Netherlands) Saul Kirsch	(Spain) Jorge Ballesteros
2008	Modified	(United States) Jose Claudio Vidanes	(Czech Republic) Zdenek Heneš	(Italy) Davide Cerrato
2008	Standard	(Germany) Olivier Damm	(Spain) Juan Carlos Jaime Diaz	(Italy) Adriano Ciro Santarcangelo
2008	Production	(Czech Republic) Adam Tyc	(Slovakia) Marian Vyšný	(United States) Angus Hobdell
2008	Revolver	(Czech Republic) Jiří Jedlička	(United States) Cliff Walsh	(Germany) Sascha Back
2009	Open	(France) Eric Grauffel	(Netherlands) Saul Kirsch	(Czech Republic) Miroslav Havlíček
2009	Modified	(Czech Republic) Zdeněk Heneš	(Italy) Giorgio Patria	(Italy) Davide Cerrato
2009	Standard	(Italy) Adriano Ciro Santarcangelo	(Germany) Gregory Midgley	(Czech Republic) Zdenek Liehne
2009	Production	(Czech Republic) Tyc Adam	(Czech Republic) Miroslav Zapletal	(United States) Angus Hobdell
2009	Revolver	(Ecuador) Ricardo López Tugendhat	(Czech Republic) Jiri Jedlicka	(Czech Republic) Tibor Ladic
2010	Open	(France) Eric Grauffel	(Netherlands) Saul Kirsch	(Czech Republic) Miroslav Havlíček
2010	Modified	(Czech Republic) Zdenek Heneš	(Czech Republic) Miloš Hořínek	(Czech Republic) Vít Helán
2010	Standard	(Spain) Juan Carlos Jaime Diaz	(Czech Republic) Petr Znamenáček	(Hungary) Gyorgy Batki
2010	Production	(Czech Republic) Václav Vinduška	(Slovakia) Ernest Nagy	(Slovakia) Marian Vyšný
2010	Revolver	(Czech Republic) Zdeněk Němeček	(Czech Republic) Jiří Jedlička	(Czech Republic) Milan Kolář
2012	Open	(France) Emile Obriot	(Netherlands) Saul Kirsch	(Czech Republic) Petr Pijáček
2012	Standard	(Spain) Jaun Carlos Jaime Diaz	(Czech Republic) Petr Znamenáček	(Hungary) Gyorgy Batki
2012	Production	(France) Eric Grauffel	(Spain) Eduardo de Cobos	(Serbia) Ljubisa Momcilovic
2012	Classic	(United States) Angus Hobdell	(Finland) Esa Marjoniemi	(France) Denis Altuna
2012	Revolver	(Czech Republic) Zdeněk Němeček	(Austria) Gerald Reiter	(Czech Republic) Milan Kolář
2013	Open	(Spain) Jorge Ballesteros	(France) Emile Obriot	(Netherlands) Saul Kirsch
2013	Standard	(Spain) Juan Carlos Jaime Diaz	(Italy) Cosimo Panetta	(Italy) Adriano Santarcangelo
2013	Production	(France) Eric Grauffel	(Czech Republic) Robin Šebo	(Serbia) Ljubisa Momcilovic
2013	Classic	(Italy) Edoardo Buticchi	(Italy) Stefano Iacomini	(Italy) Davide Cerrato
2013	Revolver	(Austria) Gerald Reiter	(Italy) Valter Tranquilli	(Germany) Markus Schneider
2014	Open	(Spain) Jorge Ballesteros	(United States) Max Michel	(France) Emile Obriot
2014	Standard	(Philippines) Jethro Dionisio	(United States) Blake Miguez	(Italy) Cosimo Panetta
2014	Production	(France) Eric Grauffel	(Czech Republic) Miroslav Zapletal	(Slovakia) Marian Fedor
2014	Classic	(Philippines) Edward Rivera	(France) Julien Boit	(Italy) Edoardo Roberto Buticchi
2014	Revolver	(Philippines) Phillipp Chua	(Austria) Gerald Reiter	(Czech Republic) Zdeněk Němeček
2015	Open	(Czech Republic) Martin Kameníček	(Spain) Jorge Ballesteros	(France) Emile Obriot
2015	Standard	(France) Eric Grauffel	(Philippines) Jethro Dionisio	(Czech Republic) Petr Znamenáček
2015	Production	(Serbia) Ljubisa Momcilovic	(Czech Republic) Robin Šebo	(United States) Ben Stoeger
2015	Classic	(Philippines) Jag Lejano	(United States) Angus Hobdell	(France) Julien Boit
2015	Revolver	(Austria) Gerald Reiter	(Czech Republic) Zdeněk Němeček	(Sweden) Kalle Halvarsson
2016	Open	(Spain) Jorge Ballesteros	(France) Emile Obriot	(Czech Republic) Martin Kameníček
2016	Standard	(France) Eric Grauffel	(Czech Republic) Zdeněk Liehne	(Hungary) György Batki
2016	Production	(Spain) Eduardo de Cobos	(United States) Ben Stoeger	(Czech Republic) Robin Šebo
2016	Classic	(Germany) Gregory Midgley	(France) Julien Boit	(Austria) Gerald Stacherl
2016	Revolver	(Austria) Gerald Reiter	(Sweden) Kalle Halvarsson	(Czech Republic) Jiří Jedlička
2017	Open	(Spain) Jorge Ballesteros	(Czech Republic) Martin Kameníček	(Czech Republic) Miroslav Havlíček
2017	Standard	(France) Eric Grauffel	(Czech Republic) Zdeněk Liehne	(Czech Republic) Petr Znamenáček
2017	Production	(Serbia) Ljubisa Momcilovic	(Spain) Eduardo de Cobos	(Russia) Pavel Torgashov
2017	Classic	(Philippines) Jethro Dionisio	(Germany) Gregory Midgley	(Russia) Alexey Ragozin
2017	Revolver	(Austria) Gerald Reiter	(Denmark) Henrik F. Nielsen	(Austria) Robert Kroiss
2018	Open	(Spain) Jorge Ballesteros	(Czech Republic) Havlíček Miroslav	(Spain) Espilez Ivan
2018	Standard	(Czech Republic) Rakušan Josef	(Czech Republic) Liehne Zdeněk	(Argentina) Quindi Vallerga Gaston
2018	Production	(Serbia) Ljubisa Momcilovic	(Czech Republic) Robin Šebo	(Spain) De Cobos Eduardo
2018	Classic	(Philippines) Lejano Jeufro	(Philippines) Dionisio Jethro	(Czech Republic) Marx Jakub
2018	Revolver	(Denmark) Nielsen Henrik F.	(Sweden) Lindskog Olle	(France) Grégory Michel
2018	Pistole Caliber Carbine	(France) Eric Grauffel	(United States) Leograndis Max	(Czech Republic) Vinduška Václav
2018	Production Optics	(Czech Republic) Kameníček Martin	(United States) Nelson Brian	(Italy) Bragagnolo Max
2019	Open	(Czech Republic) Šebo Robin	(France) Obriot Emile	(France) Piget Manu
2019	Standard	(Czech Republic) Liehne Zdeněk	(Argentina) Quindi Vallerga Gaston	(United States) Reed Casey
2019	Production	(France) Eric Grauffel	(Serbia) Ljubisa Momcilovic	(United States) Lane Mason
2019	Classic	(Philippines) Dionisio Jethro	(Czech Republic) Marx Jakub	(Slovenia) Cernigoj Robert
2019	Revolver	(Austria) Reiter Gerald	(Thailand) Ploysutti Siriroj	(Denmark) Nielsen Henrik F.
2019	Pistole Caliber Carbine	(United States) Leograndis Max	(Slovakia) Ženčar Pavol	(Czech Republic) Vinduška Václav
2019	Production Optics	(United States) Hwansik Kim	(Canada) Latulippe Max	(Germany) Nothnagel Nils
2021	Open	(France) Eric Grauffel	(France) Emile Obriot	(Czech Republic) Robin Šebo
2021	Standard	(Czech Republic) Josef Rakušan	(Slovenia) Robert Černigoj	(Czech Republic) Zdeněk Liehne
2021	Production	(Czech Republic) Michal Štěpán	(Serbia) Ljubisa Momcilovic	(Czech Republic) Miroslav Zapletal
2021	Classic	(Poland) Bartosz Szczesny	(Czech Republic) Jakub Marx	(Hungary) Gyula Midglecz
2021	Revolver			
2021	Pistole Caliber Carbine	(Slovakia) Pavol Ženčár	(United States) Max Leograndis	(Czech Republic) František Bindík
2021	Production Optics	(Czech Republic) Martin Kameníček	(Germany) Nils Nothnagel	(Czech Republic) Radim Maděránek
2022	Open	(Spain) Ballesteros Jorge	(France) Obriot Emile	(Czech Republic) Šebo Robin
2022	Standard	(Philippines) Viray Kahlil Adrian	(Czech Republic) Josef Rakušan	(Argentina) Quindi Vallerga Gaston
2022	Production	(France) Eric Grauffel	(Czech Republic) Štěpán Michal	(Argentina) Romitelli German
2022	Classic	(Philippines) Catalan Alfredo jr.	(Slovenia) Cernigoj Robert	(Philippines) Luzuriaga Thomas
2022	Revolver			
2022	Pistole Caliber Carbine	(Slovakia) Ženčar Pavol	(Slovakia) Fedor Marian	(Czech Republic) Slavík Daniel
2022	Production Optics	(Czech Republic) Kameníček Martin	(Philippines) Gino Edcel John	(Czech Republic) Maděránek Radim
2023	Open	(Czech Republic) Šebo Robin	(Sweden) Stjernlof Erik	(Czech Republic) Havlíček Miroslav
2023	Standard	(Philippines) Viray Kahlil Adrian	(Czech Republic) Liehne Zdeněk	(Czech Republic) Rakušan Josef
2023	Production	(France) Eric Grauffel	(Czech Republic) Štěpán Michal	(Serbia) Momčilovic Ljubiša
2023	Classic	(Slovenia) Cernigoj Robert	(Czech Republic) Marx Jakub	(Philippines) Lejano Jeufro
2023	Revolver			
2023	Pistole Caliber Carbine	(Austria) Theilinger Martin	(Slovakia) Fedor Marian	(Czech Republic) Slavík Daniel
2023	Production Optics	(Philippines) Gino Edcel John	(Slovakia) Hrnčiarik Andrej	(Netherlands) Keppel Dylan
2024	Open	(Czech Republic) Šebo Robin	(Austria) Angelov Angel	(Czech Republic) Havlíček Miroslav
2024	Standard	(Philippines) Viray Kahlil Adrian	(Italy) Bolzoni Giacomo	(Czech Republic) Liehne Zdeněk
2024	Production	(Czech Republic) Štěpán Michal	(Argentina) Romitelli German	(Serbia) Popovic Aleksa
2024	Classic	(Slovenia) Cernigoj Robert	(Czech Republic) Marx Jakub	(Hungary) Batki György
2024	Revolver			
2024	Pistole Caliber Carbine	(Slovakia) Fedor Marian	(Slovakia) Ženčár Pavol	(Austria) Thaler Martin
2024	Production Optics	(France) Eric Grauffel	(Czech Republic) Kameníček Martin	(Philippines) Gino Edcel John
2025	Open	(Czech Republic) Šebo Robin	(Czech Republic) Neumann Marek	(Sweden) Stjernlof Erik
2025	Standard	(Philippines) Tecson Rolly Nathaniel	(Philippines) Viray Kahlil Adrian	(Czech Republic) Liehne Zdeněk
2025	Production	(Czech Republic) Štěpán Michal	(Argentina) Duran Juan Pablo	(Argentina) Romitelli German
2025	Classic	(Slovenia) Cernigoj Robert	(Poland) Szczesny Bartosz	(Czech Republic) Marx Jakub
2025	Revolver			
2025	Pistole Caliber Carbine	(Slovakia) Ženčár Pavol	(Czech Republic) Španihelová Tereza	(France) Egret Sebastien
2025	Production Optics	(France) Eric Grauffel	(United States) Hetherington Jacob	(Czech Republic) Kameníček Martin
2025	Optics	(Czech Republic) Jurásek Ondřej	(France) Quemoun Thomas	(Spain) Edo Gerard
2026	Open	(Czech Republic) Šebo Robin	(Czech Republic) Havlíček Miroslav	(Austria) Angelov Angel
2026	Standard	(Czech Republic) Liehne Zdeněk	(Slovakia) Hladík Ryan	(Czech Republic) Rakušan Josef
2026	Production	(Philippines) Tecson Rolly Nathaniel	(Czech Republic) Štěpán Michal	(Argentina) Duran Juan Pablo
2026	Classic	(Czech Republic) Marx Jakub	(Philippines) Chan Edrick Eliseo	(Hungary) Batki György
2026	Revolver			
2026	Pistole Caliber Carbine	(United States) Leograndis Max	(Finland) Haaranen Sami	(Poland) Dunder Bartosz
2026	Production Optics	(Philippines) Gino Edcel john	(Czech Republic) Kameníček Martin	(Brazil) Saldanha Jr. Jaime
2026	Optics	(France) Eric Grauffel	(United States) Hammond Ashton	(Poland) Szczesny Bartosz

== The shooting range ==
The Hodonice shooting range is situated 12 kilometres southeast of the town of Znojmo and is owned by the CLUB IPSC Znojmo. The range was built in the 1990s from a former gravel pit, and its 28 shooting bays and total length of more than 500 meters makes it one of the largest outdoor shooting ranges in Europe. The range has a parking lot with capacity for 100 cars, an office building, sanitary facilities, space for chronographing and safety areas. The shooting range is used for matches, training, shooting instruction and corporate events. Among big matches held on the range are the Extreme Euro Open, Czech Super League and the IPSC Czech Rifle Championship.
