= 2017 IPSC Handgun World Shoot =

International shooting tournament

Coordinates: 46.8238°N 1.7572°E

- Venue: National Shooting Centre, Châteauroux
- Dates: Opening Ceremony: 27. August; Main Match: 28. August - 2. September; Shoot-Off: 3. September; Awards: 3. September
- Competitors: 1506 from 76 nations

Medalists
gold medal	Production (Largest Division) (United States) Ben Stoeger
silver medal	(Russia) Pavel Torgashov
bronze medal	(Spain) Eduardo de Cobos

The 2017 IPSC Handgun World Shoot XVIII was the 18th IPSC Handgun World Shoot held at the new National Shooting Centre in Châteauroux, France during the end of August and start of September. There were 30 stages divided into 5 areas, with each area being named after and having themes from one of the 5 continents Africa, Asia, America, Australia or Europe.

The Production division saw the hardest competition of the match with the largest match participation and the winner Ben Stoeger from USA finishing under half a point in front of Russian shooter Pavel Torgashov, pushing him down into second place with the very close final score of 99.98 %. Production division arguably had the toughest top ten competition, with a margin of only 3.8 % between first and ninth place. Maria Gushchina from Russia made an impressive performance placing both first in Lady Production and sixth in Production Overall.

== Match info ==
The match was very varied with many moving targets, and some stages had targets placed at distances up to 50 meters. The French Minister of Sports Laura Flessel mada an appearance showing support for the French Standard division shooter Eric Grauffel.

== Champions ==
=== Open ===
The Open division had the second largest match participation with 407 competitors (27 %).

Individual

Overall	Competitor	Points	Overall Match Percent	
Gold	(Spain) Jorge Ballesteros	2292.6920	100.00%	
Silver	(United States) Simon Racaza	2258.4526	98.51%	
Bronze	(France) Emile Obriot	2235.9699	97.53%	
4th	(Brazil) Jaime Roberto Maia Saldanha Junior	2212.1884	96.49%	
5th	(United States) KC Eusebio	2205.8379	96.21%	
6th	(United States) Max Michel	2195.1046	95.74%	
7th	(Australia) Brodie McIntosh	2189.7488	95.51%	
8th	(Philippines) Edcel John Gino	2186.5513	95.37%	
9th	(Netherlands) Saul Kirsch	2160.1327	94.22%	
10th	(Italy) Cosimo Panetta	2106.5474	91.88%	
Lady	Competitor	Points	Overall percent	Category percent
Gold	(Australia) Karla Blowers	1853.2722	80.83%	100.00%
Silver	(United States) Jessie Duff	1824.5493	79.58%	98.45%
Bronze	(United States) Kaci Lynn Cochran	1797.8368	78.42%	97.01%
Junior	Competitor	Points	Overall percent	Category percent
Gold	(Brazil) Mauro Kenji Murakami	1626.4381	70.94%	100.00%
Silver	(United States) Clement Caesar Ho	1515.9715	66.12%	93.21%
Bronze	(Thailand) Dangdee Hongdalud	1456.6312	63.53%	89.56%
Senior	Competitor	Points	Overall percent	Category percent
Gold	(Belgium) Frank Witters	1930.4595	84.20%	100.00%
Silver	(Spain) Jose Zanon Blasco	1877.1794	81.88%	97.24%
Bronze	(Italy) Daniele Barbizzi	1851.2000	80.74%	95.89%
Super Senior	Competitor	Points	Overall percent	Category percent
Gold	(France) Thierry Obriot	1743.5679	76.05%	100.00%
Silver	(Thailand) Wat Srijinta-Angkul	1616.6611	70.51%	92.72%
Bronze	(France) Philippe Gibert	1585.0496	69.13%	90.91%

Teams Open

Overall	Country	Points	Percent	Team members
Gold	United States	6381.7162	100.00%	Max Michel, Chris Tilley, Shannon Smith, William Drummond
Silver	Australia	6237.1700	97.73%	Brodie McIntosh, Rhys Arthur, David McConachie, Gareth Graham
Bronze	Spain	6215.0775	97.39%	Jorge Ballesteros, Ivan Espilez Urbon, Javier Gonzalez Perez, Jose Zanon Blasco
Lady teams	Country	Points	Percent	Team members
Gold	United States	5318.7200	100.00%	Jessie Duff, Kaci Lynn Cochran, Sloan Sanders, Lisa Munson
Silver	Australia	5148.8697	96.81%	Karla Blowers, Natalie Anderson, Linda Blowers
Bronze	South Africa	4397.9664	82.69%	Alexis Biermann, Kirsty Bohler, Susan Kriel, Ets Van Den Berg
Senior teams	Country	Points	Percent	Team members
Gold	Italy	5347.7081	100.00%	Daniele Barbizzi, Paolo Ravizzini, Giuseppe Todaro, Salvatore Luigi Garau
Silver	United States	5085.1089	95.09%	Steven Thomas, Kerry Pearson, Leighton Oosthuisen, Michael Voigt
Bronze	France	5071.1239	94.83%	Thierry Obriot, Patrice Martin, Jean Luc Desagneaux, Bruno Grasso

=== Standard ===
The Standard division had the third largest match participation with 379 competitors (25.2 %).

Individual

Overall	Competitor	Points	Overall Match Percent	
Gold	(France) Eric Grauffel	2336.5047	100.00%	
Silver	(United States) Robert Vogel	2274.2809	97.34%	
Bronze	(United States) Nils Jonasson	2233.6302	95.60%	
4th	(United States) Shane Coley	2156.8738	92.31%	
5th	(Philippines) Edward Rivera	2156.2811	92.29%	
6th	(Spain) Juan Carlos Jaime Diaz	2132.4514	91.27%	
7th	(Philippines) Kahlil Adrian Viray	2100.7726	89.91%	
8th	(Italy) Bolzoni, Giacomo	2095.9794	89.71%	
9th	(Indonesia) Djajadiningrat, Vincentius	2094.9076	89.66%	
10th	(Philippines) Joseph Jr Bernabe	2070.4669	88.61%	
Lady	Competitor	Points	Overall percent	Category percent
Gold	(Switzerland) Christine Burkhalter	1683.3174	72.04%	100.00%
Silver	(United States) Ashley Rheuark	1623.8095	69.50%	96.46%
Bronze	(Norway) Hilde Nakling	1603.7359	68.64%	95.27%
Junior	Competitor	Points	Overall percent	Category percent
Gold	(Philippines) Kahlil Adrian Viray	2100.7726	89.91%	100.00%
Silver	(Philippines) Rolly Nathaniel Tecson	2020.9968	86.50%	96.20%
Bronze	(Brazil) Mario Batista Neto	1711.4648	73.25%	81.47%
Senior	Competitor	Points	Overall percent	Category percent
Gold	(United States) Emanuel Bragg	2056.1766	88.00%	100.00%
Silver	(Austria) Reinhard Handl	1880.0447	80.46%	91.43%
Bronze	(Italy) Adriano Ciro Santarcangelo	1839.4971	78.73%	89.46%
Super Senior	Competitor	Points	Overall percent	Category percent
Gold	(Italy) Esterino Magli	1653.0679	70.75%	100.00%
Silver	(Brazil) Lucimar Domingues Oliveira	1628.5223	69.70%	98.52%
Bronze	(Philippines) Israelito Pible	1521.2420	65.11%	92.03%

Teams Standard

Overall	Country	Points	Percent	Team members
Gold	United States	6499.8175	100.00%	Robert Vogel, Shane Coley, Blake Miguez, Emanuel Bragg
Silver	Philippines	6327.5206	97.35%	Edward Rivera, Kahlil Adrian Viray, Joseph Jr Bernabe, John Paul Santiaguel
Bronze	France	6121.7117	94.18%	Eric Grauffel, Louis Guichard, Julien Boit, Jerome Poiret
Lady teams	Country	Points	Percent	Team members
Gold	Russia	3921.9005	100.00%	Elena Efimova, Anastasia Chernenko, Tatiana Makarova, Marina Zagulyaeva
Silver	Norway	3894.3731	99.30%	Hilde Nakling, Ingunn Marie Edvardsen, Tone Tsigakis Ostreng, Eirin Grotan Kirknes
Bronze	Germany	3603.5867	91.88%	Petra Tutschke, Sabine Wurster, Rita Burkhart, Frauke Mansion
Senior teams	Country	Points	Percent	Team members
Gold	Italy	5203.2598	100.00%	Leonardo Bettoni, Paolo Paoletti, Mauro D'alessandro, Fabrizio Pesce
Silver	Austria	4981.9162	95.75%	Reinhard Handl, Gottfried Post, Thomas Birner, Hubert Muehlbacher
Bronze	Russia	4765.5773	91.59%	Ilya Gubin, Evgeny Petrushin, Evgeny Efimov, Vasil Kurbatskikh

=== Production ===
The Production division had the largest match participation with 487 competitors (32.3 %).

Individual

Overall	Competitor	Points	Overall Match Percent	
Gold	(United States) Ben Stoeger	2192.6068	100.00%	
Silver	(Russia) Pavel Torgashov	2192.1999	99.98%	
Bronze	(Spain) Eduardo de Cobos	2171.0655	99.02%	
4th	(Serbia) Ljubisa Momcilovic	2168.9336	98.92%	
5th	(United States) Salvador Luna	2153.9707	98.24%	
6th	(Russia) Maria Gushchina	2153.8272	98.23%	
7th	(Czech Republic) Robin Sebo	2139.5718	97.58%	
8th	(Russia) Alexey Pichugin	2126.0606	96.97%	
9th	(Czech Republic) Michal Stepan	2109.2680	96.20%	
10th	(Sweden) Magnus Johansson	2051.1369	93.55%	
Lady	Competitor	Points	Overall percent	Category percent
Gold	(Russia) Maria Gushchina	2153.8272	98.23%	100.00%
Silver	(Italy) Violetta Boehm	1637.8093	74.70%	76.04%
Bronze	(United States) Randi Rogers	1626.8851	74.20%	75.53%
Junior	Competitor	Points	Overall percent	Category percent
Gold	(Russia) Nikita Nemykin	1784.5432	81.39%	100.00%
Silver	(France) Baptiste Felt	1663.7601	75.88%	93.23%
Bronze	(Russia) Danila Pakhomov	1650.9516	75.30%	92.51%
Senior	Competitor	Points	Overall percent	Category percent
Gold	(Slovakia) Jan Palka	1873.4312	85.44%	100.00%
Silver	(United States) Frank William Garcia	1826.8258	83.32%	97.51%
Bronze	(United States) Angus Hobdell	1807.3518	82.43%	96.47%
Super Senior	Competitor	Points	Overall percent	Category percent
Gold	(Germany) Heribert Bettermann	1571.3016	71.66%	100.00%
Silver	(South Africa) Rob Hopper	1526.7821	69.63%	97.17%
Bronze	(Germany) Max Wiegand	1401.6426	63.93%	89.20%

Teams Production

Overall	Country	Points	Percent	Team members
Gold	Russia	6472.0877	100.00%	Pavel Torgashov, Maria Gushchina, Alexey Pichugin, Nikolai Onshin
Silver	United States	6385.0989	98.66%	Ben Stoeger, Salvador Luna, Brian Norris, Casey Reed
Bronze	Czech Republic	6285.5205	97.12%	Robin Sebo, Michal Stepan, Miroslav Zapletal
Lady teams	Country	Points	Percent	Team members
Gold	United States	4643.1730	100.00%	Randi Rogers, Sara Taylor, Candice Juliano, Cindi Thomas
Silver	Italy	4370.9652	94.14%	Violetta Boehm, Ilaria Giunchiglia, Lucia Caroli, Marianna Limarova
Bronze	Russia	4329.1863	93.24%	Ekaterina Gordienko, Irina Gorbacheva, Ekaterina Tabachenko, Inna Deledivka
Junior teams	Country	Points	Percent	Team members
Gold	Russia	5072.3002	100.00%	Nikita Nemykin, Danila Pakhomov, Dmitry Novikov, Kirill Fedorov
Silver	France	4479.0522	88.30%	Baptiste Felt, Paul Dagorno, Baptiste Jazet
Senior teams	Country	Points	Percent	Team members
Gold	United States	5187.9415	100.00%	Frank William Garcia, Gilberto Perez, Gordon Carrell, Brad Bolz
Silver	Italy	5049.8855	97.34%	Giovanni Zuccolo, Davide Cerrato, Valter Tranquilli, Mario Piccioni
Bronze	Germany	4643.6190	89.51%	Joerg Haben, Rolf Dieter Reich, Frank Weuster, Olaf Van Essen

=== Classic ===
The Classic division had the fourth largest match participation with 164 competitors (10.9 %).

Individual

Overall	Competitor	Points	Overall Match Percent	
Gold	(United States) Elias Frangoulis	2191.6388	100.00%	
Silver	(Philippines) Jeufro Emil Lejano	2076.8448	94.76%	
Bronze	(Philippines) Jethro Dionisio	2076.6685	94.75%	
4th	(United States) Phil Strader	2046.0685	93.36%	
5th	(United States) Jeremy Reid	2044.9257	93.31%	
6th	(Philippines) Lenard Lopez	2010.0355	91.71%	
7th	(Germany) Gregory Midgley	2007.3307	91.59%	
8th	(Italy) Roberto Vezzoli	2004.0773	91.44%	
9th	(Philippines) Wilfredo Jr Martin	1962.1684	89.53%	
10th	(Italy) Edoardo Buticchi	1939.6316	88.50%	
Lady	Competitor	Points	Overall percent	Category percent
Gold	(United States) Julie Golob	1602.0253	73.10%	100.00%
Silver	(Serbia) Jelena Savkovic	1483.0726	67.67%	92.57%
Bronze	(Philippines) Grace Tamayo	1446.0789	65.98%	90.27%
Senior	Competitor	Points	Overall percent	Category percent
Gold	(Italy) Edoardo Buticchi	1939.6316	88.50%	100.00%
Silver	(Thailand) Narongsak Kaewmuangpet	1831.7240	83.58%	94.44%
Bronze	(Italy) Guido Ciccarelli	1791.1485	81.73%	92.34%
Super Senior	Competitor	Points	Overall percent	Category percent
Gold	(France) Joel Gerard	1531.7793	69.89%	100.00%
Silver	(Canada) Randy Fisher	1471.1048	67.12%	96.04%
Bronze	(Denmark) Gert Erling Hansen	1349.6862	61.58%	88.11%

Teams Classic

Overall	Country	Points	Percent	Team members
Gold	United States	6124.3587	100.00%	Elias Paul Frangoulis, Jeremy Reid, Randall Arrowood, Rob Leatham
Silver	Philippines	5989.5014	97.80%	Jeufro Emil Lejano, Wilfredo Jr Martin, Bernardo Mari V Alejandro, William Magalong
Bronze	Italy	5827.5639	95.15%	Roberto Vezzoli, Edoardo Buticchi, Alessandro Pettinelli, Guido Ciccarelli
Senior teams	Country	Points	Percent	Team members
Gold	United States	5083.1075	100.00%	John Allen Koppi, Harold Arthur Christy, Lyle Keith Dilworth, Robert Novak
Silver	France	4736.8887	93.19%	Michel Nestolat, Denis Altuna, Joel Gerard, Philippe Rouge
Bronze	South Africa	4485.2870	88.24%	Dion Du Bruyn, Wayne Hammond, Abraham Jansen Van Vuuren, Jan Van Den Berg

=== Revolver ===
The Revolver division had the fifth largest match participation with 69 competitors (4.6 %).

Individual

Overall	Competitor	Points	Overall Match Percent	
Gold	(United States) Michael William Poggie	2307.0044	100.00%	
Silver	(Austria) Gerald Reiter	2262.3355	98.06%	
Bronze	(United States) Joshua Lentz	2258.5747	97.90%	
4th	(Germany) Sascha Back	2195.9996	95.19%	
5th	(United States) Rich Wolfe	2126.9147	92.19%	
6th	(United States) David Olhasso	2126.5723	92.18%	
7th	(Denmark) Henrik Nielsen	2078.7244	90.10%	
8th	(Brazil) Moacir de Azevedo	2051.0417	88.91%	
9th	(Sweden) Kalle Halvarsson	2026.2984	87.83%	
10th	(Germany) Markus Schneider	2016.9749	87.43%	
Lady	Competitor	Points	Overall percent	Category percent
Gold	(Russia) Vera Treskova	1337.2981	57.97%	100.00%
Silver	(Russia) Olga Kuznetsova	935.8880	40.57%	69.98%
Bronze	(Russia) Daria Zharkova	819.4597	35.52%	61.28%
Senior	Competitor	Points	Overall percent	Category percent
Gold	(Brazil) Moacir de Azevedo	2051.0417	88.91%	100.00%
Silver	(Germany) Markus Schneider	2016.9749	87.43%	98.34%
Bronze	(Sweden) Olof Lindskog	1763.4999	76.44%	85.98%

Teams Revolver

Overall	Country	Points	Percent	Team members
Gold	United States	6692.4938	100.00%	Michael William Poggie, Joshua Lentz, Rich Wolfe, David Olhasso
Silver	Germany	5989.9135	89.50%	Sascha Back, Markus Schneider, Guenther Knaus, Holger Joest
Bronze	Austria	5973.9100	89.26%	Gerald Reiter, Johann Lang, Markus Pack, Robert Kroiss

== Medal table ==
Rank	Country	Gold	Silver	Bronze	Total
1	United States	13	7	5	25
2	Russia	5	3	5	13
3	Italy	4	3	4	11
4	France	3	2	5	10
5	Australia	2	1	1	4
6	Philippines	1	4	3	8
7	Germany	1	2	3	6
8	Spain	1	1	2	4
9	Brazil	1	1	1	3
10	Sweden	1	0	1	2
11	Belgium	1	0	0	1
12	Slovakia	1	0	0	1
13	Austria	0	3	0	3
14	South Africa	0	2	2	4
15	Thailand	0	2	1	3
16	Norway	0	1	1	2
17	Canada	0	1	0	1
18	Serbia	0	1	0	1
19	Denmark	0	0	1	1
	Total	34	34	34	102

== Shoot-Off side event ==
On Sunday 3 September, the Shoot-Off side event was held in an audience friendly one-against-one elimination cup format where the competitors shot at falling steel targets (called poppers). The top 10 finishing overall and category shooters from the Main Match were qualified for the Shoot-Off. To win a round, a competitor would have to hit all his steel targets and reach the middle middle target before the other competitor. The Shoot-Off consisted of quarter finals, semi-finals, bronze and gold finals.

Division	Category	Gold	Silver	Bronze
Open	Overall	(Spain) Jorge Ballesteros	(United States) Simon Racaza	(France) Emile Obriot
Open	Lady	(United States) Jessica Duff	(United States) Kaci Lynn Cochran	(United States) Sloan Sanders
Open	Junior	(United States) Clement Caesar Ho	(Brazil) Mauro Kenji Murakami	(Thailand) Dangdee Hongdalud
Open	Senior	(Spain) Jose Zanon Blasco	(Sweden) Johan Hansen	(Brazil) Augusto Ribas
Open	Super Senior	(France) Philippe Gibert	(Thailand) Wat Srijinta - Angkul	(Brazil) Roberto Saldanha
Standard	Overall	(United States) Shane Coley	(United States) Nils Konrad Jonasson	(France) Eric Grauffel
Standard	Lady	(Switzerland) Christine Burkhalter	(Australia) Claire Giles	(Norway) Hilde Nakling
Standard	Junior	(Philippines) Kahlil Adrian Viray	(Thailand) Saditkorn Chomrit	(Philippines) Rolly Nathaniel Tecson
Standard	Senior	(Italy) Adriano Santarcangelo	(Italy) Leonardo Bettoni	(United States) Emanuel Bragg
Standard	Super Senior	(Italy) Esterino Magli	(Brazil) Lucimar Domingues Oliveira	(Philippines) Benjamin Jr Belarmino
Production	Overall	(Serbia) Ljubiša Momčilović	(United States) Benjamin Stoeger	(Spain) Eduardo de Cobos
Production	Lady	(Russia) Maria Guschina	(France) Margaux Nycz	(Italy) Violetta Boehm
Production	Junior	(Russia) Nikita Nemykin	(France) Baptiste Felt	(Australia) James Phegan
Production	Senior	(Italy) Giovanni Zuccolo	(United States) Gordon Carrell	(United States) Gilberto Perez
Production	Super Senior	(South Africa) Rob Hopper	(Brazil) Maoro Guimaraes	-
Classic	Overall	(United States) Elias Frangoulis	(Philippines) Jeufro Emil Leujano	(Philippines) Jethro Dionisio
Classic	Lady	(United States) Julie Golob	(Serbia) Jelena Savković	(Philippines) Grace Tamayo
Classic	Senior	(Italy) Edoardo Buticchi	(Thailand) Narongsak Kaewmuanpet	-
Classic	Super Senior	(Denmark) Gert Erling Hansen	(France) Joël Gerard	-
Revolver	Overall	(United States) Michael William Poggie	(United States) David Olhasso	(Denmark) Henrik F. Nielsen
Revolver	Senior	(Brazil) Moacir De Azevedo	(Germany) Markus Schneider	(Netherlands) Eric Cornelissen

== CZ Super Six side event ==
Another side event on Sunday 3 September was the Super Six finals sponsored by CZ, where six of the best Overall and Lady shooters in the Production, Standard and Open divisions participated. Three of the Main Match stages were shot again by one competitor at a time in an elimination cup format based on their hit factor scores. Stage 16 was the first cut, afterwards stage 15 was the semifinal and lastly stage 17 was the final between the two best shooters.

Division	Category	Gold	Silver	Bronze
Open	Overall	(United States) Simon Racaza	(France) Emile Obriot	(Spain) Jorge Ballesteros
Open	Lady	(United States) Jessica Duff	(United States) Sloan Sanders	-
Standard	Overall	(France) Eric Grauffel	(United States) Nils Konrad Jonasson	(United States) Shane Coley
Standard	Lady	(United States) Ashley Rheuark	(Denmark) Sissal Skaale	(Australia) Claire Giles
Production	Overall	(Czech Republic) Michal Štěpán	(Serbia) Ljubiša Momčilović	(Russia) Maria Gushchina
Production	Lady	(Russia) Maria Gushchina	(France) Margaux Nycz	(Sweden) Cecilia Lindberg

== See also ==
- IPSC Rifle World Shoots
- IPSC Shotgun World Shoot
- IPSC Action Air World Shoot
