= 2011 IPSC Handgun World Shoot =

International shooting tournament

- Official logo of the 2011 IPSC Handgun World Shoot
- Venue: Kalamonas Shooting Range
- Location: Rhodes, Greece
- Competitors: 1080 from 64 nations

Medalists
gold medal	Production (Largest Division) (United States) Bob Vogel
silver medal	(United States) Ben Stoeger
bronze medal	(United States) Matthew Mink

The 2011 IPSC Handgun World Shoot XVI held at Rhodes, Greece was the 16th IPSC Handgun World Shoot. There were 30 stages which all had a Greek theme.

== Champions ==
=== Open ===
Individual

The Open division had the second largest match participation with 373 competitors (30.9 %), and was won by Eric Grauffel from France winning his 5th consecutive Handgun World Shoot. Simon Racaza of USA came in second place 3.29 % behind, and KC Eusebio of USA another 0.71 % behind.

Overall	Competitor	Points	Overall Match Percent	
Gold	(France) Eric Grauffel	2161.5327	100.00%	
Silver	(United States) Simon Racaza	2090.3262	96.71%	
Bronze	(United States) KC Eusebio	2075.0371	96.00%	
4th	(United States) Max Michel	2032.2343	94.02%	
5th	(Spain) Jorge Ballesteros	1984.7614	91.82%	
6th	(United States) Chris Tilley	1972.8225	91.27%	
7th	(Netherlands) Saul Kirsch	1966.8020	90.99%	
8th	(France) Emile Obriot	1935.8667	89.56%	
9th	(Australia) Brodie McIntosh	1933.4587	89.45%	
10th	(United States) Shane Coley	1889.7241	87.43%	
Lady	Competitor	Points	Overall percent	Category percent
Gold	(Australia) Karla Blowers	1564.3264	72.37%	100.00%
Silver	(United States) Megan Francisco	1546.0314	71.52%	98.83%
Bronze	(United States) Jessie Duff	1522.5411	70.44%	97.33%
Junior	Competitor	Points	Overall percent	Category percent
Gold	(United States) Shane Coley	1889.7241	87.43%	100.00%
Silver	(Australia) Rhys Arthur	1703.0686	78.79%	90.12%
Bronze	(United States) Ben Thompson	1675.5128	77.52%	88.66%
Senior	Competitor	Points	Overall percent	Category percent
Gold	(Switzerland) Patrik Schneider	1702.0732	78.74%	100.00%
Silver	(South Africa) Hubert Thomas Montgomery	1676.4347	77.56%	98.49%
Bronze	(Austria) Guenther Weber	1627.3416	75.29%	95.61%
Super Senior	Competitor	Points	Overall percent	Category percent
Gold	(Canada) Michael Auger	1538.2737	71.17%	100.00%
Silver	(Brazil) Jose Josias Lucena Ferreira	1520.1386	70.33%	98.82%
Bronze	(Czech Republic) Miroslav Kamenicek	1458.5918	67.48%	94.82%

Teams

Place	Country	Points	Percent	Team members
Gold			100.00%	
Silver			%	
Bronze			%	

=== Modified ===
Individual

The Modified division had 59 competitors (4.9 %). Zdenek Henes of the Czech Republic took Gold in the Modified division in what would be the last World Championship featuring the division before it was deleted. Jerome Jovanne Morales of the Philippines came in second place 0.75 % behind, and Rob Leatham of USA came in third place another 2.41 % behind.

Overall	Competitor	Points	Overall Match Percent	
Gold	(Czech Republic) Zdenek Henes	2070.2224	100.00%	
Silver	(Philippines) Jerome Jovanne Morales	2020.2959	97.59%	
Bronze	(United States) Rob Leatham	2004.8394	96.84%	
4th	(United States) Michael Voigt	1996.6022	96.44%	
5th	(Philippines) Nelson Uygongco	1984.5437	95.86%	
6th	(Brazil) Augusto Sergio Oliveira Ribas	1982.7230	95.77%	
7th	(United States) Jojo Vidanes	1953.5864	94.37%	
8th	(Philippines) Lazaro Jr Dela Cruz	1918.7898	92.69%	
9th	(Slovakia) Vit Helan	1879.4344	90.78%	
10th	(Philippines) Papa Enrico	1870.0169	90.33%	
Senior	Competitor	Points	Overall percent	Category percent
Gold	(United States) Rob Leatham	2004.8394	96.84%	100.00%
Silver	(United States) Michael Voigt	1996.6022	96.44%	99.59%
Bronze	(Germany) Juergen Flass	1726.8315	83.41%	86.13%

Teams

Place	Country	Points	Percent	Team members
Gold	USA	5955.0280	100.00%	Rob Leatham, Michael Voigt, Jojo Vidanes, Barry Dueck
Silver	Philippines	5874.8565	98.65%	Jerome Jovanne Morales, Nelson Uygongco, Enrico Papa, Christopher Panganiban
Bronze	Czech Republic	5733.2500	96.28%	Zdenek Henes, Vit Helan, Milos Horinek

=== Standard ===
Individual

The Standard division had the third largest match participation with 336 competitors (27.8 %), and was won by Blake Miguez of USA. Juan Carlos Jaime of Argentina came in second place 1.09 % behind, and Ted Puente of USA came in third place another 3.2 % behind.

Overall	Competitor	Points	Overall Match Percent	
Gold	(United States) Blake Miguez	2042.0007	100.00%	
Silver	(Argentina) Juan Carlos Jaime	2019.8368	98.91%	
Bronze	(United States) Ted Puente	1954.4319	95.71%	
4th	(Philippines) Jethro Dionisio	1949.8459	95.49%	
5th	(Hungary) Gyorgy Batki	1940.2000	95.01%	
6th	(United States) Emanuel Bragg	1923.9475	94.22%	
7th	(Czech Republic) Petr Znamenacek	1919.2622	93.99%	
8th	(United States) Travis Tomasie	1907.7391	93.42%	
9th	(France) Julien Boit	1883.7398	92.25%	
10th	(Brazil) Jaime Roberto Maia Saldanha Junior	1865.5352	91.36%	
Lady	Competitor	Points	Overall percent	Category percent
Gold	(United States) Randi Rogers	1440.7487	70.56%	100.00%
Silver	(United States) Tori Nonaka	1407.8968	68.95%	97.72%
Bronze	(United States) Lisa Munson	1398.8713	68.50%	97.09%
Junior	Competitor	Points	Overall percent	Category percent
1st	(United States) Matthew Sweeney	1667.7814	81.67%	100.00%
2nd	(Italy) Davide Bergami	1587.9085	77.76%	95.21%
3rd	(Brazil) Victor Dalmeida Arruda	1357.6409	66.49%	81.40%
Senior	Competitor	Points	Overall percent	Category percent
Gold	(Brazil) Lucimar Domingues Oliveira	1694.4334	82.98%	100.00%
Silver	(Austria) Gottfried Post	1647.4140	80.68%	97.23%
Bronze	(Italy) Salvatore Simula	1572.9145	77.03%	92.83%
Super Senior	Competitor	Points	Overall percent	Category percent
Gold	(Switzerland) Peter Kressibucher	1379.3660	67.55%	100.00%
Silver	(Canada) Robbin Hudson	1229.0047	60.19%	89.10%
Bronze	(Austria) Hubert Muhlbacher	1203.6024	58.94%	87.26%

Teams

Place	Country	Points	Percent	Team members
Gold			100.00%	
Silver			%	
Bronze			%	

=== Production ===
Individual

The Production division had the largest match participation with 397 competitors (32.8 %), and was won by Bob Vogel of the US. Ben Stoeger of the US came in second place 2.34 % behind, and Matthew Mink of the US another 0.85 % behind.

Overall	Competitor	Points	Overall Match Percent	
Gold	(United States) Bob Vogel	2018.8345	100.00%	
Silver	(United States) Ben Stoeger	1971.6789	97.66%	
Bronze	(United States) Matthew Mink	1954.5053	96.81%	
4th	(Spain) Eduardo De Cobos	1951.1763	96.65%	
5th	(Philippines) Jeufro Emil Lejano	1931.6741	95.68%	
6th	(Finland) Matti Manni	1924.6351	95.33%	
7th	(Slovakia) Marian Vysny	1922.5075	95.23%	
8th	(Serbia) Ljubisa Momcilovic	1909.0751	94.56%	
9th	(Russia) Alexey Pichugin	1883.8441	93.31%	
10th	(Czech Republic) Miroslav Zapletal	1881.0347	93.17%	
Lady	Competitor	Points	Overall percent	Category percent
Gold	(Russia) Maria Gushchina	1690.2536	83.72%	100.00%
Silver	(United States) Julie Golob	1465.1259	72.57%	86.68%
Bronze	(United States) Sara Dunivin	1459.5023	72.29%	86.35%
Junior	Competitor	Points	Overall percent	Category percent
Gold	(Slovakia) Andrej Hrnciarik	1835.5816	90.92	100.00%
Silver	(Czech Republic) Pavel Torgashov	1658.1749	82.14%	90.34%
Bronze	(Philippines) Diomari Ivan Tayag	1606.8428	79.59%	87.54%
Senior	Competitor	Points	Overall percent	Category percent
Gold	(Switzerland) Peter Heller	1727.4563	85.57%	100.00%
Silver	(Philippines) Wilfredo Anglo	1650.7791	81.77%	95.56%
Bronze	(Italy) Francesco Servodio	1541.3121	76.35%	89.22%
Super Senior	Competitor	Points	Overall percent	Category percent
Gold	(Germany) Max Wiegand	1388.6102	68.78%	100.00%
Silver	(United Kingdom) Robert Dunkley	1311.8065	64.98%	94.47%
Bronze	(South Africa) Gerrit Dokter	1252.7853	62.05%	90.22%

Teams

Place	Country	Points	Percent	Team members
Gold			100.00%	
Silver			%	
Bronze			%	

=== Revolver ===
Individual

The Revolver division had 44 competitors (3.6 %), and was won by Ricardo López Tugendhat of Ecuador claiming his second consecutive Handgun World Shoot victory in the Revolver division. Jerry Miculek of USA came in second place 5.16 % behind, and Matthew Griffin of USA came in third place another 6.42 % behind.

Overall	Competitor	Points	Overall Match Percent	
Gold	(Ecuador) Ricardo López Tugendhat	2125.9081	100.00%	
Silver	(United States) Jerry Miculek	2016.1364	94.84%	
Bronze	(United States) Matthew Griffin	1879.7188	88.42%	
4th	(Germany) Sascha Back	1879.5531	88.41%	
5th	(Philippines) Phillipp Chua	1876.5566	88.27%	
6th	(Czech Republic) Zdeněk Němeček	1868.1494	87.88%	
7th	(Germany) Markus Schneider	1803.6415	84.84%	
8th	(Austria) Hermann Kirchweger	1802.1137	84.77%	
9th	(Brazil) Moacir Azevedo	1758.8465	82.73%	
10th	(United States) Clifford Walsh	1727.2302	81.25%	
Senior	Competitor	Points	Overall percent	Category percent
Gold	(United States) Jerry Miculek	2016.1364	94.84%	100.00%
Silver	(Czech Republic) Zdeněk Němeček	1868.1494	87.88%	92.66%
Bronze	(Austria) Hermann Kirchweger	1802.1137	84.77%	89.38%

Teams

Place	Country	Points	Percent	Team members
Gold			100.00%	
Silver			%	
Bronze			%	

== See also ==
- IPSC Rifle World Shoots
- IPSC Shotgun World Shoot
- IPSC Action Air World Shoot
