= 2014 IPSC Handgun World Shoot =

International shooting tournament

Coordinates: 27.7654°N 81.4313°W

2014 IPSC Handgun World Shoot XVII at the Handgun World Shoot
- Official logo of the 2014 IPSC Handgun World Shoot
- Location: Frostproof, Florida
- Dates: Opening Ceremony: Sunday 12. October; Main Match: Monday 13. October - Saturday 18. October; Closing Ceremony: Sunday 19. October
- Competitors: 1304 from 69 nations

Medalists
gold medal	Production (Largest Division) (France) Eric Grauffel
silver medal	(United States) Simon Racaza
bronze medal	(United States) Ben Stoeger

The 2014 IPSC Handgun World Shoot XVII held at the Universal Shooting Academy in Frostproof, Florida, United States, was the 17th IPSC Handgun World Shoot.

== Champions ==
=== Open ===
The Open division had the second largest match participation with 385 competitors (29.5 %), and was won by Max Michel of USA in front of his American teammate Shane Coley by 0.08 %, and Brodie McIntosh from Australia in third place by another 1.8 %.

Individual

Overall	Competitor	Points	Overall Match Percent	
Gold	(United States) Max Michel	2204.2927	100.00%	
Silver	(United States) Shane Coley	2202.5568	99.92%	
Bronze	(Australia) Brodie McIntosh	2162.8209	98.12%	
4th	(United States) KC Eusebio	2137.3119	96.96%	
5th	(France) Emile Obriot	2131.8326	96.71%	
6th	(Czech Republic) Martin Kamenicek	2126.7935	96.48%	
7th	(United States) Chris Tilley	2112.3710	95.83%	
8th	(Italy) Luca Borsari	2109.9874	95.72%	
9th	(Spain) Jorge Ballesteros	2107.6852	95.62%	
10th	(Netherlands) Saul Kirsch	2104.0516	95.45%	
Lady	Competitor	Points	Overall percent	Category percent
Gold	(Australia) Karla Blowers	1817.3116	82.44%	100.00%
Silver	(Czech Republic) Martina Sera	1775.9066	80.57%	97.72%
Bronze	(United States) Kaci Cochran	1763.9772	80.02%	97.07%
Junior	Competitor	Points	Overall percent	Category percent
Gold	(Finland) Simo Partanen	2013.7050	91.35%	100.00%
Silver	(United States) Kincaid Ross	1977.2736	89.70%	98.19%
Bronze	(Philippines) Edcel John Gino	1962.4717	89.03%	97.46%
Senior	Competitor	Points	Overall percent	Category percent
Gold	(United States) Michael Voigt	1921.9866	87.19%	100.00%
Silver	(Italy) Paolo Andrea Ravizzini	1889.4891	85.72%	98.31%
Bronze	(Philippines) Nelson Uygongco	1887.4294	85.63%	98.20%
Super Senior	Competitor	Points	Overall percent	Category percent
Gold	(France) Thierry Obriot	1695.9376	76.94%	100.00%
Silver	(Italy) Giovanni Furio Liberti	1600.6589	72.62%	94.38%
Bronze	(Jamaica) Anthony Johnson	1598.6945	72.53%	94.27%

Teams Open

Overall	Country	Points	Percent	Team members
Gold	United States	6544.1614	100.00%	Max Michel, Shane Coley, KC Eusebio, Chris Tilley
Silver	Czech Republic	6137.5093	93.79%	Martin Kamenicek, Miroslav Havlicek, Zdenek Henes
Bronze	Australia	6125.3867	93.60%	Brodie McIntosh, Nick Kapor, Gareth Graham, David McConachie

=== Standard ===
The Standard division had the third largest match participation with 374 competitors (28.7 %). Nils Jonasson of USA took the Standard division gold in front of his two American teammates Bob Vogel in second place by 1.34 %, and Dave Sevigny in third place another 0.02 % behind Vogel.

Individual

Overall	Competitor	Points	Overall Match Percent	
Gold	(United States) Nils Jonasson	2248.6894	100.00%	
Silver	(United States) Bob Vogel	2218.4884	98.66%	
Bronze	(United States) Dave Sevigny	2218.0716	98.64%	
4th	(Spain) Juan Carlos Jaime Diaz	2203.7277	98.00%	
5th	(United States) Matt Sweeney	2197.2004	97.71%	
6th	(Italy) Cosimo Panetta	2187.5426	97.28%	
7th	(United States) Blake Miguez	2144.1840	95.35%	
8th	(United States) Travis Tomasie	2139.8009	95.16%	
9th	(Brazil) Jaime Saldanha Jr	2120.4619	94.30%	
10th	(Hungary) Gyorgy Batki	2117.5323	94.17%	
Lady	Competitor	Points	Overall percent	Category percent
Gold	(Norway) Hilde Nakling	1618.4426	71.97%	100.00%
Silver	(United States) Tori Nonaka	1604.0533	71.33%	99.11%
Bronze	(United States) Randi Rogers	1574.6862	70.03%	97.30%
Junior	Competitor	Points	Overall percent	Category percent
Gold	(Philippines) Michael Ron Ligon	1883.6964	83.77%	100.00%
Silver	(Indonesia) Vincentius Djajadiningrat	1854.8193	82.48%	98.47%
Bronze	(Brazil) Gabriel Barbosa	1827.8833	81.29%	97.04%
Senior	Competitor	Points	Overall percent	Category percent
Gold	(United States) Emmanuel Bragg	2023.0745	89.97%	100.00%
Silver	(Italy) Adriano Santarcangelo	2019.8612	89.82%	99.84%
Bronze	(United States) Ron Avery	1910.6490	84.97%	94.44%
Super Senior	Competitor	Points	Overall percent	Category percent
Gold	(Italy) Esterino Magli	1823.7577	81.10%	100.00%
Silver	(United States) Johnny Brister	1687.3838	75.04%	92.52%
Bronze	(Argentina) Ricardo Gentile	1591.7879	70.79%	87.28%

Teams Standard

Overall	Country	Points	Percent	Team members
Gold	United States	6685.2494	100.00%	Nils Jonasson, Bob Vogel, Dave Sevigny, Emanuel Bragg
Silver	Italy	6132.9641	91.74%	Cosimo Panetta, Gregorio Tassone, Max Bragagnolo, Giulio Del Rosario
Bronze	Spain	5850.5001	87.51%	Juan Carlos Jaime Diaz, Gorka Ibanez, Jesus Ferreiro, David Davite

=== Production ===
The Production division had the largest match participation with 392 competitors (30.1 %), and was won by Eric Grauffel from France taking his 7th consecutive Handgun World Shoot gold medal. Simon Racaza representing USA came in second place by 3.32 %, and his American teammate Ben Stoeger can in third place another 0.56 % behind Racaza.

Individual

Overall	Competitor	Points	Overall Match Percent	
Gold	(France) Eric Grauffel	2382.4540	100.00%	
Silver	(United States) Simon Racaza	2303.3279	96.68%	
Bronze	(United States) Ben Stoeger	2290.0889	96.12%	
4th	(Czech Republic) Robin Sebo	2189.2608	91.89%	
5th	(Serbia) Ljubisa Momcilovic	2149.5622	90.22%	
6th	(Philippines) Paul Bryant Yu	2089.8879	87.72%	
7th	(United States) Matthew Mink	2086.1091	87.56%	
8th	(Czech Republic) Zdenek Liehne	2082.6317	87.42%	
9th	(Russia) Alexey Pichugin	2071.1764	86.93%	
10th	(Argentina) German Romitelli	2052.1247	86.13%	
Lady	Competitor	Points	Overall percent	Category percent
Gold	(Russia) Maria Gushchina	1979.1145	83.07%	100.00%
Silver	(Switzerland) Christine Burkhalter	1665.9251	69.92%	84.18%
Bronze	(United States) Julie Golob	1557.9669	65.39%	78.72%
Junior	Competitor	Points	Overall percent	Category percent
Gold	(Russia) Pavel Torgashov	1973.7941	82.85%	100.00%
Silver	(United States) Jacob Hetherington	1972.0660	82.77%	99.91%
Bronze	(United States) Jason Katz	1949.3046	81.82%	98.76%
Senior	Competitor	Points	Overall percent	Category percent
Gold	(United States) Frank Garcia	2010.9495	84.41%	100.00%
Silver	(Brazil) Guga Ribas	1822.3297	76.49%	90.62%
Bronze	(United States) Gilbert Perez	1794.2577	75.31%	89.22%
Super Senior	Competitor	Points	Overall percent	Category percent
Gold	(Czech Republic) Miroslav Kamenicek	1589.8925	66.73%	100.00%
Silver	(Brazil) Mauro Thompson	1426.1499	59.86%	89.70%
Bronze	(Philippines) Edwin Gotamco	1395.7611	58.59%	87.79%

Teams Production

Overall	Country	Points	Percent	Team members
Gold	United States	6679.5259	100.00%	Simon Racaza, Ben Stoeger, Matthew Mink
Silver	Czech Republic	6313.8761	94.53%	Robin Sebo, Zdenek Liehne, Miroslav Zapletal, Michal Stepan
Bronze	France	6044.1766	90.49%	Eric Grauffel, Louis Adrien Guichard, Mathieu Lavergne, Baptiste Felt

=== Classic ===
The Classic division had 104 competitors (8.0 %). Senior shooter Rob Leatham of USA, in addition to winning the Senior category, also won the Classic Overall category, and thereby claimed his 6th Handgun World Shoot gold medal. Edward Rivera of the Philippines took second place by 0.28 %, and Todd Jarrett of USA took third place another 0.99 % behind.

Individual

Overall	Competitor	Points	Overall Match Percent	
Gold	(United States) Rob Leatham	2269.6106	100.00%	
Silver	(Philippines) Edward Rivera	2263.2546	99.72%	
Bronze	(United States) Todd Jarrett	2240.8480	98.73%	
4th	(United States) Ted Puente	2167.5030	95.50%	
5th	(Italy) Edoardo Buticchi	2163.4496	95.32%	
6th	(United States) Jeremy Reid	2117.4818	93.30%	
7th	(Italy) Roberto Vezzoli	2099.6874	92.51%	
8th	(France) Julien Boit	2098.6511	92.47%	
9th	(Philippines) Wilfredo Jr Martin	2098.4649	92.46%	
10th	(United States) Angus Hobdell	2034.4711	89.64%	
Lady	Competitor	Points	Overall percent	Category percent
Gold	(France) Anne Fonder	1383.8544	60.97%	100.00%
Silver	(Philippines) Leonora Darte	1354.2149	59.67%	97.86%
Bronze	(Brazil) Bruna Mirandola	1049.5129	46.24%	75.84%
Senior	Competitor	Points	Overall percent	Category percent
Gold	(United States) Rob Leatham	2269.6106	100.00%	100.00%
Silver	(United States) Todd Jarrett	2240.8480	98.73%	98.73%
Bronze	(France) Michel Nestolat	1847.8623	81.42%	81.42%
Super Senior	Competitor	Points	Overall percent	Category percent
Gold	(Philippines) Daniel Torrevillas	1607.6933	70.84%	100.00%
Silver	(United Kingdom) Robert Edward Dunkley	1563.3489	68.88%	97.24%
Bronze	(Canada) Randy Fisher	1498.8996	66.04%	93.23%

Teams Classic

Overall	Country	Points	Percent	Team members
Gold	United States	6346.8120	100.00%	Rob Leatham, Todd Jarrett, Gary Byerly, Keith Dilworth
Silver	Philippines	6343.9388	99.96%	Edward Rivera, Wilfredo Jr Martin, Jerome Morales, William Magalong
Bronze	Italy	6122.8449	96.47%	Edoardo Buticchi, Roberto Vezzoli, Mauro Di Prospero, Mario Piccioni

=== Revolver ===
The Revolver division had 49 competitors (3.8 %) and was won by Ricardo López Tugendhat from Ecuador who took his third consecutive Revolver division World title. Josh Lentz of USA followed in second place by 1.06 %, and Phillipp Chua from the Philippines in third place another 3.43 % behind Lentz.

Individual

Overall	Competitor	Points	Overall Match Percent	
Gold	(Ecuador) Ricardo López Tugendhat	2260.7991	100.00%	
Silver	(United States) Josh Lentz	2236.9057	98.94%	
Bronze	(Philippines) Phillipp Chua	2159.2227	95.51%	
4th	(Germany) Sascha Back	2145.5545	94.90%	
5th	(Austria) Gerald Reiter	2132.9811	94.35%	
6th	(United States) David Olhasso	2045.0796	90.46%	
7th	(United States) Matt Griffin	1992.5520	88.13%	
8th	(Austria) Hermann Kirchweger	1974.2686	87.33%	
9th	(Brazil) Moacyr Azevedo	1921.9971	85.01%	
10th	(Brazil) Wagner Almeida	1916.0347	84.75%	
Senior	Competitor	Points	Overall percent	Category percent
Gold	(Austria) Hermann Kirchweger	1974.2686	87.33%	100.00%
Silver	(Czech Republic) Zdenek Nemecek	1878.9350	83.11%	95.17%
Bronze	(United States) Jess Christensen	1819.6337	80.49%	92.17%
Super Senior	Competitor	Points	Overall percent	Category percent
Gold	(United States) Aysen Elliot	1866.7615	82.57%	100.00%
Silver	(Czech Republic) Lumir Safranek	1445.8513	63.95%	77.45%
Bronze	(United States) Tony Hyatt	1206.8855	53.38%	64.65%

Teams Revolver

Overall	Country	Points	Percent	Team members
Gold	United States	6184.8829	100.00%	Josh Lentz, David Olhasso, Cliff Walsh, Elliot Aysen
Silver	Austria	5945.4234	96.13%	Gerald Reiter, Hermann Kirchweger, Reinhard Handl, Robert Kroiss
Bronze	Brazil	5685.5642	91.93%	Moacyr Azevedo, Wagner Almeida, Daniel Polverini, Rogerio Rosas

== See also ==
- IPSC Rifle World Shoots
- IPSC Shotgun World Shoot
- IPSC Action Air World Shoot
