= IPSC French Rifle Championship =

French sport shooting competition

The IPSC French Rifle Championship is an IPSC level 3 championship held once a year by the French Shooting Federation.

== Champions ==
The following is a list of current and previous champions.

=== Overall category ===
Year	Division	Gold	Silver	Bronze	Venue
2015	Open	(France) Eric Grauffel	(France) Sebastien S Egret	(France) Siegbert S Papzien	
2015	Standard	(France) Christophe C Alazard	(France) Sébastien S Matter	(France) Tilo T Fickinger	
2016	Open	(France) Eric Grauffel	(France) Jerome J Poiret	(France) Sébastien S Egret	
2016	Standard	(France) Manuele M Avoledo	(France) Christophe C Alazard	(France) Sebastien S Matter	

=== Lady category ===
Year	Division	Gold	Silver	Bronze	Venue
2015	Open	(France)	(France)	(France)	

=== Junior category ===
Year	Division	Gold	Silver	Bronze	Venue
2015	Open	(France)	(France)	(France)	

=== Senior category ===
Year	Division	Gold	Silver	Bronze	Venue
2015	Standard	(France) Arnaud A Fayolle-Laplanche	(France) Philippe P Quintin	(France)	
2016	Standard	(France) Arnaud A Fayolle-laplanche	(France)	(France)	

=== Super Senior category ===
Year	Division	Gold	Silver	Bronze	Venue
2015	Open	(France) Joël J Gerard	(France) Philippe P Gibert	(France) Alain A Tarrade	
2016	Open	(France) Joel J Gerard	(France) Thierry T Obriot	(France) Alain A Tarrade	
2016	Standard	(France) Jacques J Laurembourle	(France) Jean J Farkas	(France) Jacques J Sautour	

== See also ==
- IPSC French Handgun Championship
- IPSC French Shotgun Championship
