= IPSC French Shotgun Championship =

French sport shooting competition

The IPSC French Rifle Championship is an IPSC level 3 championship held once a year by the French Shooting Federation.

== Champions ==
The following is a list of current and previous champions.

=== Overall category ===
Year	Division	Gold	Silver	Bronze	Venue
2017	Open	(France) Jerome Poiret	(France) Denis Altuna	(France) Patrick Bezot	
2017	Standard	(France) Sebastien Egret	(France) Christian Vandenabeelle	(France) Francois Xavier Dyba	
2017	Standard Manual	(France) Christophe Marye	(France) Philippe Goy	(France) Sébastien Rusche	

Year	Division	Gold	Silver	Bronze	Venue
2016	Open	(France) Jerome Poiret	(France) Denis Altuna	(France) Laurent De Chesse	
2016	Standard	(France) Eric Grauffel	(France) Sebastien Egret	(France) Jean Pierre Colombini	
2016	Standard Manual	(France) Nicolas Leretrif	(France) Morgan Denoyelles	(France) Francois Beaunier	

=== Senior category ===
Year	Division	Gold	Silver	Bronze	Venue
2016	Open	(France) Pierre P Martin-Privat	(France) Philippe P Gibert	(France) Bruno B Polo	
2016	Standard	(France) Jean Pierre J Colombini	(France) Christian C Vandenabeelle	(France) Joël J Gerard	

== See also ==
- IPSC French Handgun Championship
- IPSC French Rifle Championship
