= Ashley Rheuark =

American sport shooter

Ashley Rheuark "Ashley Robertson"
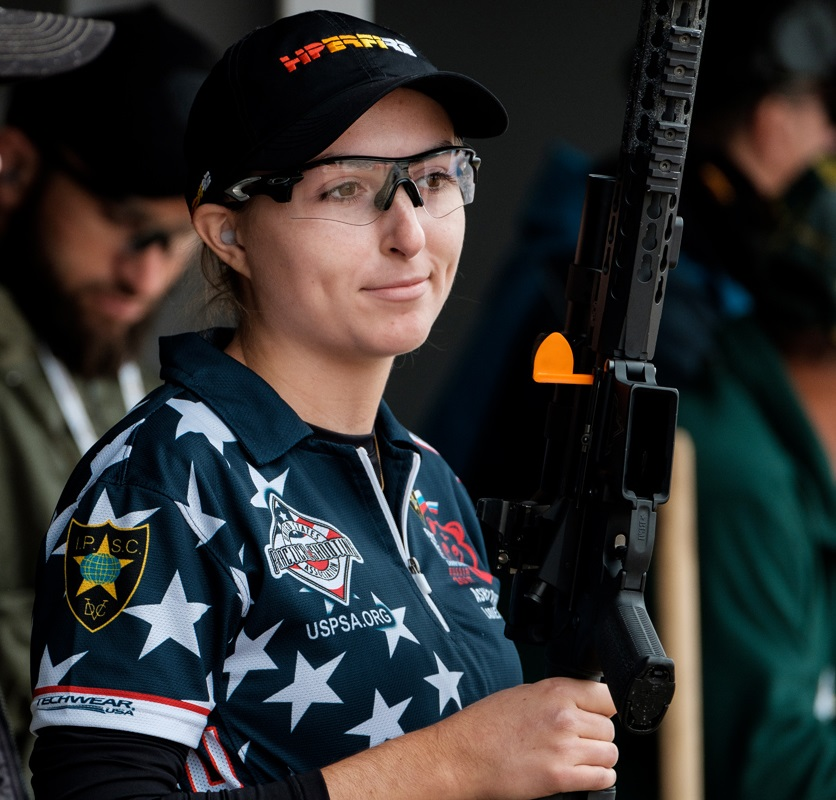
- Ashley Rheuark at the 2017 IPSC Rifle World Shoot in Russia

Personal information
- Nationality: (United States) American
- Occupation: IPSC shooter

Sport
- Team: Team GLOCK
Medal record
IPSC
Representing United States
IPSC Handgun World Shoot
Gold medal – first place	2017 Châteauroux	Lady Standard
IPSC Rifle World Shoot
Silver medal – second place	2017 Moscow	Lady Open

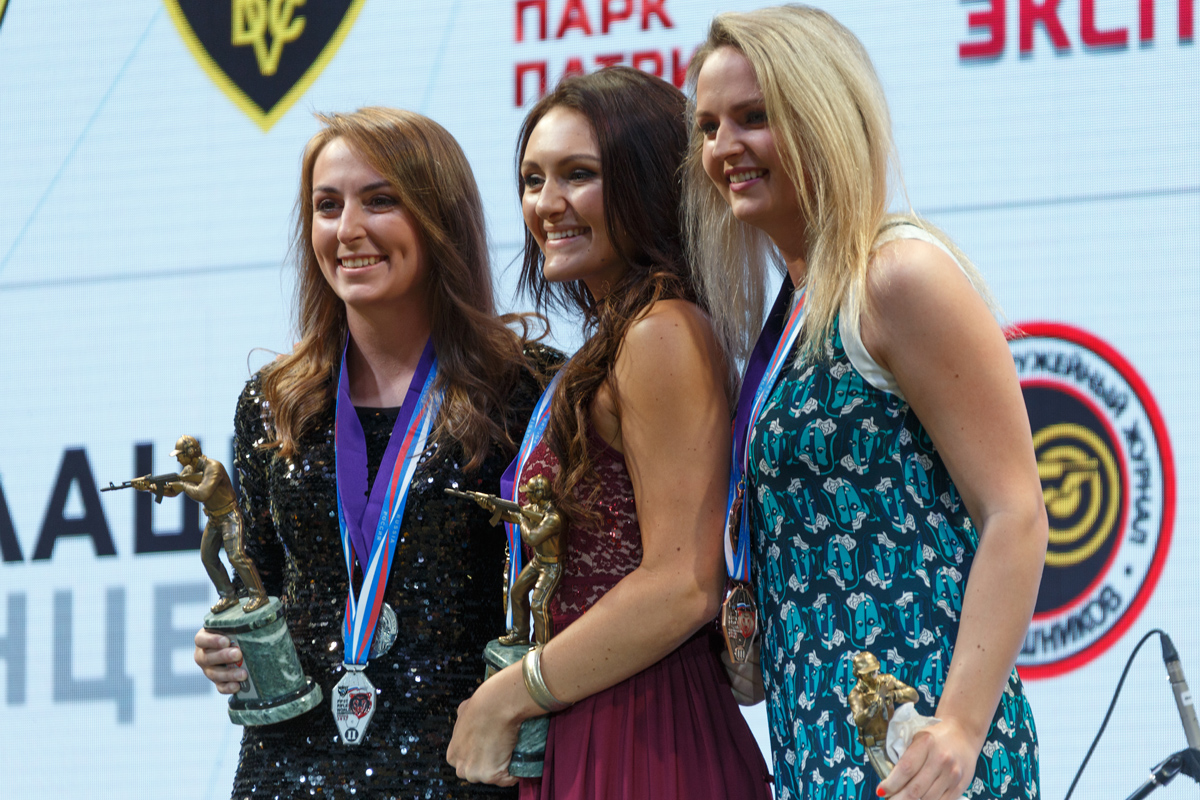
Ashley Rheuark (left) at the podium of the 2017 IPSC Rifle World Shoot.

Ashley Rheuark is an American sport shooter who took silver medal in the Standard Division Lady category at the 2017 IPSC Handgun World Shoot, and silver medal in the Open Division Lady category at the 2017 IPSC Rifle World Shoot. She is also USPSA National Champion, ranked as an IDPA Distinguished Master (the first ever woman to achieve this rank), and has proven herself as a strong competitor in multigun (3-Gun) competitions.

Summary of Accomplishments:

- IPSC Lady Rifle World Champion
- USPSA Grand Master
- IDPA Distinguished Master (First ever female IDPA DM)

Ashley was introduced to shooting while deer hunting with her dad at the age of 10. In March 2017, she entered team Team Glock at 18 years old.

== See also ==
- Maria Gushchina, Russian sport shooter
- Lena Miculek, American sport shooter
