= Nakling =

Nakling is a surname. Notable people with the surname include:

- Hilde Nakling (born 1982), Norwegian shooter
- Vidar Nakling (born 1950), Norwegian shooter
