= Practical Shooting Association of the Czech Republic =

Sport shooting organization

Czech Sport Dynamic Shooting Association (IPSC.CZ)
- Asociace Sportovní Dynamické Střelby České Republiky
- Formation: 1992
- President: Martin Novotný (2021–present)
- Parent organization: International Practical Shooting Confederation
- Staff: 1103 members (2024)
- Website: ipsc.cz

The Association of Czech Sport Dynamic Shooting (Czech: Asociace Sportovní Dynamické Střelby České Republiky), also known as ASDS ČR, is the Czech association for practical shooting under the International Practical Shooting Confederation. ASDS ČR was founded on June 8, 1992, then as an association of citizens. Because of changes in legislation, ASDS ČR became a union of clubs in 2016.

== Structure ==
The Association of Sports Dynamic Shooting of the Czech Republic, z.s. has established the following parts:

- The members' meeting, as the highest authority of ASDS ČR
- Statutory body of ASDS ČR - President of ASDS ČR
- Control commission of ASDS ČR
- General secretary of ASDS ČR
- CNROI - Czech National Range Officer Institute

The Association of Sports Dynamic Shooting has established a control committee to which members can submit suggestions and proposals. The control committee is responsible to the membership meeting.

One of the most important parts of the association is the competitions. Competitions are divided by level - level 1-5.

- Level 1: Club competitions
- Level 2: Matches open to participants from different clubs
- Level 3: Regional competitions, i.e. national championships or other large competitions, such as the Extreme Euro Open
- Level 4: Continental Championships, i.e. European Championships or Pan American Championships
- Level 5: World Championships IPSC Handgun World Shoots

More than 20 level 3 competitions are held in the Czech Republic every year.

== Significant events ==
In 2004, the IPSC European Handgun Championship was held at the shooting range in Opařany, near Tábor. The same shooting range hosted the IPSC European Shotgun Championship in 2009. In 2025, the first ever PCC (Pistol Caliber Carbine) and Mini Rifle Worldshoot Championships were held at the shooting ranges in Oblekovice and Hodonice near Znojmo.

== Successes of Czech shooters ==
At the 2026 IPSC European Handgun Championship in Hungary, the Czech team, consisting of 94 sport shooters, won a historic 32 medals, including 12 gold.

From IPSC Handgun World Shoots in 2025 the Czech delegation brought home a total of 10 medals – 1 gold, 4 silver and 5 bronze.

== See also ==
- IPSC Czech Handgun Championship
- IPSC Czech Rifle Championship
- IPSC Czech Shotgun Championship
- Extreme Euro Open
