= Ben Stoeger =

American sport shooter and firearms instructor

Benjamin Thomas Stoeger
Personal information
- Nationality: (United States) American
- Occupations: IPSC shooter, firearms instructor
- Website: benstoeger.com

Sport
- Team: Team Tanfoglio
Medal record
IPSC
Representing United States
IPSC Handgun World Shoot
| Silver medal – second place | 2011 Rhodes | Production |
| Bronze medal – third place | 2014 Frostproof | Production |
| Gold medal – first place | 2017 Châteauroux | Production |
IPSC US Handgun Championship
| Silver medal – second place | 2009 | Production |
| Silver medal – second place | 2011 Columbia | Production |
| Gold medal – first place | 2012 Frostproof | Production |
| Gold medal – first place | 2013 Frostproof | Production |
| Gold medal – first place | 2015 Frostproof | Production |
| Silver medal – second place | 2016 Frostproof | Production |

Benjamin Thomas Stoeger is an American competition shooter and firearms instructor who started competing actively in 2005. He placed first in the 2017 IPSC Handgun World Shoot, second behind Bob Vogel in the 2011 IPSC Handgun World Shoot, and placed third in the 2014 IPSC Handgun World Shoot behind Eric Grauffel and Simon "JJ" Racaza. He is also three time IPSC US Handgun Production Champion (2012, 2013 and 2015), eight time USPSA Handgun Production Champion (2011, 2012, 2013, 2014, 2015, 2017, 2018, and 2019).

== Associations ==
At Ben Stoeger's personal website benstoeger.com he includes his views and tips about how to shoot the Action Shooting sports of IPSC and USPSA, and some of the latest competition gear for those sports.

Practical Shooting After Dark is a podcast featuring Stoeger and other USPSA competitors discussing the sport.

Practical Shooting Training Group is an online coaching platform for USPSA/IPSC Practical Shooting created by Stoeger and fellow competitor Hwansik Kim. The site contains drills with video explanations and written diagrams, training video, and a venue to get feedback on student-submitted video . Stoeger also teaches with Joel Park, XA Matt Pranka and Velox Nick Young.

Stoeger also runs a Youtube channel presenting practical shooting tips and gun industry commentary. As of August 2026, the channel has 124,000 subscribers.

== Bibliography ==
Books

- Champion Shooting: Guaranteed Results in 15 Minutes A Day (2012) by Jay Hirshberg and Ben Stoeger
- Champion Shooting: A Proven Process for Success at Any Level (2012) by Jay Hirshberg and Ben Stoeger
- Practical Pistol - Fundamental Techniques and Competition Skills (2013) by Ben Stoeger
- Dry-Fire Training: For the Practical Pistol Shooter (2014) by Ben Stoeger
- Skills and Drills: For the Practical Pistol Shooter (2014) by Ben Stoeger, Timmy Meyers, Ronnie Casper, Brandon Edwards
- Practical Pistol Reloaded (2016) by Ben Stoeger
- DryFire Reloaded (2017) by Ben Stoeger
- Skills and Drills Reloaded (2018) by Ben Stoeger
- Breakthrough Marksmanship (2019) by Ben Stoeger
- Match Mentality (2020) by Ben Stoeger and Joel Park
- Practical Shooting Training (2021) by Ben Stoeger and Joel Park
- Adaptive Rifle (2022) by Ben Stoeger and Joel Park
- Dryfire (2025) by Ben Stoeger
- Skills and Drills (2025) by Ben Stoeger

Videos

- Training to Win with Ben Stoeger (2014)
- Practical Pistol Foundations with Ben Stoeger (2015)

== See also ==
- Eric Grauffel, French sport shooter
- Max Michel, American sport shooter
- Jorge Ballesteros, Spanish sport shooter
- Hwansik Kim
