= IPSC Czech Shotgun Championship =

The IPSC Czech Shotgun Championship is an IPSC level 3 championship held once a year by the Practical Shooting Association of the Czech Republic.

== Champions ==
The following is a list of current and previous champions.

=== Overall category ===
Year	Division	Gold	Silver	Bronze	Venue
2006	Open	(Czech Republic) Vaclav Vinduska	(Czech Republic) Petr Duchon	(Czech Republic) Petr Znamenacek	
2006	Standard	(Czech Republic) Michael Rehak	(Czech Republic) Vaclav Martinek	(Czech Republic) Ivo Strnad	
2006	Standard Manual	(Czech Republic) Roman Sedy	(Czech Republic) Premysl Marek	(Czech Republic) Lumir Safranek	

=== Senior category ===
Year	Division	Gold	Silver	Bronze	Venue
2006	Standard Manual Senior	(Czech Republic) Lumir Safranek	(Czech Republic) Miroslav Marek	(Czech Republic)	

== See also ==
- IPSC Czech Handgun Championship
- IPSC Czech Rifle Championship
