= Dominic Meier (marksman) =

Swiss practical sport shooter (born 1969)

Personal information
- Born: 8 August 1969 (age 56)
Medal record
IPSC
Representing Switzerland
IPSC Swiss Handgun Championship
Gold medal – first place	1995	Open
Gold medal – first place	1996	Open
Gold medal – first place	1998	Open
Gold medal – first place	2000	Open
Gold medal – first place	2011	Modified
Gold medal – first place	2012	Open
Gold medal – first place	2013	Open
Gold medal – first place	2015	Open

Dominic Meier is a Swiss practical sport shooter who is 8 time Swiss national champion. He joined the Swiss national team at the end of 1993 and is today one of the most successful IPSC shooters in Switzerland.
