= IPSC Spanish Handgun Championship =

Sport shooting competition in Spain

The IPSC Spanish Handgun Championship is an IPSC level 3 championship held once a year by the Royal Spanish Olympic Shooting Federation.

== Champions ==
The following is a list of current and previous champions.

=== Overall category ===
Year	Division	Gold	Silver	Bronze	Venue
1997	Open	(Spain) Eduardo de Cobos	(Spain)	(Spain)	
1998	Open	(Spain) Eduardo de Cobos	(Spain)	(Spain)	
1999	Open	(Spain) Eduardo de Cobos	(Spain)	(Spain)	
2000	Open	(Spain) Eduardo de Cobos	(Spain)	(Spain)	
2002	Open	(Spain) Eduardo de Cobos	(Spain)	(Spain)	
2005	Open	(Spain) Jorge Ballesteros	(Spain) Juan Carlos Ballesteros Descalzo	(Spain) Samuel Rios Anguita	
2005	Standard	(Spain) Eduardo de Cobos	(Spain) Juan Carlos Garcia Jaime	(Spain) Manuel Gañan Garcia	
2006	Open	(Spain) Jorge Ballesteros	(Spain) Juan Carlos Ballesteros	(Spain) Vicente Salinas	
2006	Modified	(Spain) Rosendo Miguez	(Spain) Diego Cruz	(Spain) Pablo Jimenez	
2006	Standard	(Spain) Jorge Ballesteros	(Spain) Juan Carlos Jaime	(Spain) Manuel Gañan	
2006	Production	(Spain) Eduardo de Cobos	(Spain) Pablo Jimenez	(Spain) Juan C. Ballesteros	
2007	Open	(Spain)	(Spain)	(Spain)	
2007	Standard	(Spain)	(Spain)	(Spain)	
2007	Production	(Spain)	(Spain)	(Spain)	
2008	Open	(Spain) Jorge Ballesteros	(Spain) Ivan Espilez	(Spain) Javier Gonzalez	
2008	Standard	(Spain) Juan Carlos Jaime	(Spain) Jaume Marroig	(Spain) Gabriel Pitarch	
2008	Production	(Spain) Eduardo de Cobos	(Spain) Pablo Jimenez	(Spain) Juan Carlos Ballesteros	
2009	Open	(Spain) Jorge Ballesteros	(Spain) Juan Carlos Ballesteros	(Spain) Javier Gonzalez	
2009	Standard	(Spain) Juan Carlos Jaime	(Spain) Gabriel Pitarch	(Spain) Rosendo Miguez	
2009	Production	(Spain) Eduardo de Cobos	(Spain) Jose Vicente Perez	(Spain) Pablo Jimenez	
2010	Open	(Spain) Jorge Ballesteros	(Spain) Juan Carlos Ballesteros	(Spain) Javier Gonzalez	
2010	Standard	(Spain) Juan Carlos Jaime	(Spain) Manuel Gañan	(Spain) David Viñuelas	
2010	Production	(Spain) Eduardo de Cobos	(Spain) Gorka Ibañez	(Spain) Jose Vicente Perez	
2011	Open	(Spain) Jorge Ballesteros	(Spain) Ivan Espilez Urbon	(Spain) Javier Gonzalez Perez	
2011	Modified	(Spain) Antonio Garcia Infantes	(Spain) Carlos Soler Alberola	(Spain) Francisco Jose Cerdan Perez	
2011	Standard	(Spain) Juan Carlos Jaime Diaz	(Spain) Gabriel Pitarch Garcia	(Spain) David Martinez Viñuelas	
2011	Production	(Spain) Eduardo de Cobos	(Spain) Jose Vicente Perez Baz	(Spain) Fco. Javier Salvador Esparza	
2012	Open	(Spain) Jorge Ballesteros	(Spain) Emile Obriot	(Spain) Ivan Espilez	
2012	Standard	(Spain) Juan Carlos Jaime	(Spain) Jensen Ralf	(Spain) David Martinez	
2012	Production	(Spain) Eduardo de Cobos	(Spain) Jose Vicente Perez	(Spain) Gorka Ibañez	
2013	Open	(Spain) Jorge Ballesteros	(Spain) Ivan Espilez Urbon	(Spain) Javier Gonzalez Perez	
2013	Standard	(Spain) Juan Carlos Jaime Diaz	(Spain) Gorka Ibaã‘Ez Charola	(Spain) Jesus Ferreiro Rodriguez	
2013	Production	(Spain) Eduardo de Cobos	(Spain) Jose Vicente Perez Vaz	(Spain) Eduardo Vicente Lober	
2013	Classic	(Spain) Jaime Garcia Sanchez	(Spain) Fernando Martinez Bermejo	(Spain) Juan Antonio Sanchez Quero	
2014	Open	(Spain) Javier González Pérez	(Spain) Juan Carlos Ballesteros Descalzo	(Spain) Ivan Espilez Urbon	
2014	Standard	(Spain) Juan Carlos Jaime Diaz	(Spain) Jesus Ferreiro Rodriguez	(Spain) Francisco Urquizar Fajardo	
2014	Production	(Spain) Eduardo de Cobos	(Spain) Jose Vicente Perez Baz	(Spain) Miguel Angel León Villalpando	
2014	Classic	(Spain) Jabier Les Ortiz De Pinedo	(Spain) Jaime García Sánchez	(Spain) Juan Antonio Diez Herrer	
2015	Open	(Spain) Jorge Ballesteros	(Spain) Juan Carlos Jaime Diaz	(Spain) Ivan Espilez Urbon	
2015	Standard	(Spain) Juan Carlos Ballesteros Descalzo	(Spain) David Davite Aguiar	(Spain) Rosendo Miguez Varela	
2015	Production	(Spain) Francisco Manosalvas De La Torre	(Spain) Federico Conde Gala	(Spain) Juan Jose Rojas Rodriguez	
2015	Classic	(Spain) Jose Vicente Perez Baz	(Spain) Manuel Silva	(Spain) Buenaventura Darias Medina	
2016	Open	(Spain) Jorge Ballesteros	(Spain) Javier Gonzalez	(Spain) Jesus Gonzalez	
2016	Standard	(Spain) Juan Carlos Jaime	(Spain) Manuel Gañan	(Spain) Manuel Cervera	
2016	Production	(Spain) Eduardo de Cobos	(Spain) Carlos Javier Sanchez	(Spain) Juan Guerrero	
2016	Classic	(Spain) Francisco Manosalvas	(Spain) Juan Carlos Ballesteros	(Spain) Juan Antonio Diez	
2017	Open	(Spain)	(Spain)	(Spain)	
2017	Standard	(Spain)	(Spain)	(Spain)	
2017	Production	(Spain)	(Spain)	(Spain)	
2017	Classic	(Spain)	(Spain)	(Spain)	

=== Lady ===
Year	Division	Gold	Silver	Bronze	Venue
2005	Open	(Spain) Lorena Ballesteros Fernandez	(Spain) Pilar Fernandez Moreno	(Spain) Matilde Veguillas Garcia	
2005	Standard	(Spain) Concepcion Perez Gil	(Spain) Maria Martinez De Las Heras	(Spain) Rocio Arrizabalaga Mafe	
2006	Open	(Spain) Pilar Fernandez	(Spain) Lorena Ballesteros	(Spain) Matilde Veguillas	
2006	Standard	(Spain) Concepción Perez Gil	(Spain) Lorena Ballesteros	(Spain) Matilde Veguillas	
2008	Open	(Spain) Lorena Ballesteros	(Spain) Matilde Veguillas	(Spain) Pilar Fernandez	
2009	Open	(Spain) Lorena Ballesteros	(Spain) Pilar Fernandez	(Spain) Matilde Veguillas	
2009	Production	(Spain) Eva Abellan Lopez	(Spain) Rakel Malanka Ruiz	(Spain) Maria Carracedo	
2010	Open	(Spain) Lorena Ballesteros	(Spain) Pilar Fernandez	(Spain) Maria Martinez	
2010	Production	(Spain) Rakel Malanda	(Spain) Matilde Veguillas	(Spain) Montserrat Fernandez	
2011	Open	(Spain) Pilar Fernandez Moreno	(Spain) Rakel Malanda Ruiz	(Spain) Cristina Barros Gussoni	
2011	Production	(Spain) Matilde Veguillas Garcia	(Spain) Marja-Leena Vapanen	(Spain) Veronica Estiguin Garcia	
2012	Open	(Spain) Lorena Ballesteros	(Spain) Pilar Fernandez	(Spain) Rakel Malanka	
2012	Production	(Spain) Matilde Veguillas	(Spain) Montserrat Fernandez	(Spain) Veronica Estiguin	
2013	Open	(Spain) Rakel Malanda Ruiz	(Spain) Lorena Ballesteros Fernandez	(Spain) Pilar Fernandez Moreno	
2013	Standard	(Spain) Concepcion Perez Gil	(Spain) Marja-Leena Vapanen	(Spain) Maria Elena Prieto Bodelon	
2013	Production	(Spain) Matilde Veguillas Garcia	(Spain) Montserrat Fernandez Alarcon	(Spain) Maria Carracedo Guerra	
2014	Production	(Spain) Matilde Veguillas García	(Spain) Montserrat Fernandez Alarcon	(Spain) Maria Carracedo Guerra	
2015	Standard	(Spain) Concepcion Perez Gil	(Spain) Marja-Leena Vapanen	(Spain) Francisca Haro Ordoñez	
2015	Production	(Spain) Rakel Malanda Ruiz	(Spain) Montserrat Fernandez Alarcon	(Spain) Isabel Perez Zamorano	
2016	Production	(Spain) Rakel Malanda	(Spain) Natalia Perez	(Spain) Beatriz Garcia	

=== Junior ===
Year	Division	Gold	Silver	Bronze	Venue

=== Senior ===
Year	Division	Gold	Silver	Bronze	Venue
2005	Open	(Spain) Antonio Garcia Infantes	(Spain) Arturo Belvis Verdasco	(Spain) Jon Munitxa Aguirre	
2005	Standard	(Spain) Teodoro Rios Marrero	(Spain) Jose Luis Velazquez Escudero	(Spain) Enrique Fernandez Bello	
2006	Open	(Spain) Antonio G. Infantes	(Spain) Arturo Belvis	(Spain) Jose L. Espilez	
2006	Modified	(Spain) Jose L. Ellauri	(Spain) Rafael Salvador	(Spain) Juan A. Martinez	
2006	Standard	(Spain) Antonio G. Infantes	(Spain) Jose Luis Velazquez	(Spain) Francisco Zaragosí	
2006	Production	(Spain) Francisco Flores	(Spain) Arturo Belvis	(Spain) Kheir Holo	
2008	Open	(Spain) Antonio Garcia	(Spain) Jesus Garcia	(Spain) Arturo Belvis	
2008	Standard	(Spain) Nazario Castrillo	(Spain) Antonio Beltran	(Spain) Jose Luis Velazquez	
2008	Production	(Spain) Ceferino Masip	(Spain) Juan Rodriguez	(Spain) Francisco Flores	
2009	Open	(Spain) Juan Carlos Ballesteros	(Spain) Antonio Garcia Infantes	(Spain) Marcial Borrias	
2009	Standard	(Spain) Antonio Beltran Rubio	(Spain) Fernando Iglesias	(Spain) Lluis Duran Aisa	
2009	Production	(Spain) Ceferino Masip	(Spain) Rafael Conde	(Spain) Santiago Garcia Canseco	
2010	Open	(Spain) Juan Carlos Ballesteros	(Spain) Antonio Garcia Infantes	(Spain) Pilar Fernandez	
2010	Standard	(Spain) Jose Manuel Lopez	(Spain) LLuis Duran	(Spain) Jose Antonio Gonzalez	
2010	Production	(Spain) Ceferino Masip	(Spain) Marcial Borrias	(Spain) Daniel Dantas	
2011	Open	(Spain) Juan Carlos Ballesteros Descalzo	(Spain) Jesus Garcia Infantes	(Spain) Antonio Beltran Rubio	
2011	Standard	(Spain) Rosendo Miguez Varela	(Spain) Jose Antonio Gonzalez Dominguez	(Spain) Manuel Aguado Taboada	
2011	Production	(Spain) Pablo Jimenez Jimenez	(Spain) Federico Conde Gala	(Spain) Jaime Garcia Sanchez	
2012	Open	(Spain) Juan Carlos Ballesteros	(Spain) Thierry Obriot	(Spain) Antonio Garcia Infantes	
2012	Standard	(Spain) Rosendo Miguez Varela	(Spain) Jose Antonio Gonzalez	(Spain) Fernando Iglesias	
2012	Production	(Spain) Javier Manso	(Spain) Federico Conde	(Spain) Matilde Veguillas	
2013	Open	(Spain) Juan Carlos Ballesteros Descalzo	(Spain) Antonio Garcia Infantes	(Spain) Jose Maria Guerra Reina	
2013	Standard	(Spain) Jose Antonio Gonzalez Dominguez	(Spain) Rosendo Miguez Varela	(Spain) Angel Lavin Campo	
2013	Production	(Spain) Pablo Jimenez Jimenez	(Spain) Federico Conde Gala	(Spain) Javier Manso Martin	
2014	Open	(Spain) Juan Carlos Ballesteros Descalzo	(Spain) Miguel Angel Gonzalez Rivero	(Spain) Jose Maria Marcos Ferrero	
2014	Standard	(Spain) Francisco Rectoret Gomez	(Spain) Rosendo Míguez Varela	(Spain) Antonio Comeche Martinez	
2014	Production	(Spain) Pablo Jimenez Jimenez	(Spain) Antonio Cases Bardavio	(Spain) José Pablo Mata Diez	
2014	Classic	(Spain) Jaime García Sánchez	(Spain) Federico Conde Gala	(Spain) Pedro Lanero Garcia	
2015	Open	(Spain) Jose Zanon Blasco	(Spain) Miguel Angel Gonzalez Rivero	(Spain) Jose Maria Guerra Reina	
2015	Standard	(Spain) Juan Carlos Ballesteros Descalzo	(Spain) Rosendo Miguez Varela	(Spain) Jesus Ferreiro Rodriguez	
2015	Production	(Spain) Francisco Javie Salvador Esparza	(Spain) Manuel Jubero Carmona	(Spain) Jaime Garcia Sanchez	
2015	Classic	(Spain) Federico Conde Gala	(Spain) Pablo Jimenez Jimenez	(Spain) Juan Bautista Sanchez Gutierrez	
2016	Open	(Spain) Jose Zanon	(Spain) Miguel Angel Gonzalez	(Spain) Francisco Jose Cerdan	
2016	Standard	(Spain) Jesus Ferreiro	(Spain) Antonio Comeche	(Spain) Rosendo Miguez	
2016	Production	(Spain) Francisco Javier Salvador	(Spain) Freddy Landaeta	(Spain) Francisco Javier Lopez	
2016	Classic	(Spain) Juan Carlos Ballesteros	(Spain) Pablo Jimenez	(Spain) Francisco Rectoret	

=== Super Senior ===
Year	Division	Gold	Silver	Bronze	Venue
2008	Standard	(Spain) Enrique Fernandez	(Spain) Jose Luis Ellauri	(Spain) Amador Velasco	
2008	Production	(Spain) Rafael Salvador	(Spain) Teodoro Rios	(Spain) Kheir Holo Rawas	
2009	Open	(Spain) Arturo Belvis	(Spain) Manuel Palacio	(Spain) Manuel Salabarria	
2009	Standard	(Spain) Enrique Fernandez Bello	(Spain) Rafael Salvador	(Spain) Jose Luis Ellauri	
2009	Production	(Spain) Kheir Holo Rawas	(Spain) Claudio Mesino	(Spain) Manuel Vilardell	
2010	Standard	(Spain) Enrique Fernandez Bello	(Spain) Jose Luis Velazquez	(Spain) Jean Claude Jouy	
2011	Standard	(Spain) Jose Luis Velazquez Escudero	(Spain) Enrique Fernandez Bello	(Spain) Enrique Barreiro Daponte	
2012	Standard	(Spain) Enrique Fernandez	(Spain) Enrique Barreiro	(Spain) Ferran Tio	
2012	Production	(Spain) Rafael Salvador	(Spain) Kheir Holo Rawas	(Spain) Luis Lacalle	
2013	Standard	(Spain) Rafael Salvardor Ines	(Spain) Fernando Carracedo Perez	(Spain) Juan Cabrera Vico	
2014	Standard	(Spain) Enrique Fernandez Bello	(Spain) Rafael Salvador Inés	(Spain) Rafael García García	
2015	Open	(Spain) Jose Luis Espilez Elipe	(Spain) Jose Maria Marcos Ferrero	(Spain) Sigfrido Vega Aguiar	
2015	Standard	(Spain) Jose Antonio Gonzalez Dominguez	(Spain) Enrique Fernandez Bello	(Spain) Rafael Garcia Garcia	
2015	Production	(Spain) Augusto S Diaz Garcia	(Spain) Fernando Javier Carracedo Perez	(Spain) Rafael Salvador Ines	
2016	Standard	(Spain) Jose Antonio Gonzalez	(Spain) Fernando Iglesias	(Spain) Enrique Fernandez	
2016	Production	(Spain) Tomas Rodriguez	(Spain) Amador Miguel Mora	(Spain) Jose Garcia	
