= Christine Burkhalter =

Swiss practical sport shooter

Personal information
- Born: 23 September 1977 (age 48)
Medal record
IPSC
Representing Switzerland
IPSC Handgun World Shoot
Silver medal – second place	2014 Frostproof	Lady Production
Gold medal – first place	2017 Châteauroux	Lady Standard
IPSC European Handgun Championship
Gold medal – first place	2016 Felsőtárkány	Lady Standard
IPSC Swiss Handgun Championship
Gold medal – first place	2011	Lady Production
Gold medal – first place	2013 Juratreff	Lady Production
Gold medal – first place	2014	Lady Production
Gold medal – first place	2015 Juratreff	Lady Production
Gold medal – first place	2016	Lady Standard

Christine Burkhalter is a Swiss practical sport shooter who took silver medal at the 2014 IPSC Handgun World Shoot in the Production division Lady category, and gold in the 2016 IPSC European Handgun Championship Standard division Lady category. Christine also has four Swiss National Lady Production titles (2011, 2013, 2014 and 2015) and one Swiss National Lady Standard title (2016).
