= IPSC Swiss Handgun Championship =

Sport shooting competition in Switzerland

The IPSC Swiss Handgun Championship is an IPSC level 3 championship held once a year by the Swiss Dynamic Shooting Federation.

== Champions ==
The following is a list of previous and current champions.

=== Overall category ===
Year	Division	Gold	Silver	Bronze	Venue
1995	Open	(Switzerland) Dominic Meier	(Switzerland)	(Switzerland)	
1996	Open	(Switzerland) Dominic Meier	(Switzerland)	(Switzerland)	
1998	Open	(Switzerland) Dominic Meier	(Switzerland)	(Switzerland)	
2000	Open	(Switzerland) Dominic Meier	(Switzerland)	(Switzerland)	
2011	Modified	(Switzerland) Dominic Meier	(Switzerland)	(Switzerland)	
2012	Open	(Switzerland) Dominic Meier	(Switzerland)	(Switzerland)	
2013	Open	(Switzerland) Dominic Meier	(Switzerland) Peter Haas	(Switzerland) Beat Schmitt	Juratreff
2013	Standard	(Switzerland) Hampi Brosch	(Switzerland) Oliver Künzler	(Switzerland) Peter Kressibucher	Juratreff
2013	Production	(Switzerland) Remo Schraner	(Switzerland) Pascal Hubli	(Switzerland) Oliver Josi	Juratreff
2013	Classic	(Switzerland) Patrick Bieri	(Switzerland) Eric Pochon	(Switzerland) Thomas Steiger	Juratreff
2013	Revolver	(Switzerland) Marco Derrer	(Switzerland) Ferdinand Berger	(Switzerland) Bramwell Zürcher	Juratreff
2015	Open	(Switzerland) Dominic Meier	(Switzerland) Patrik Schneider	(Switzerland) Peter Haas	Juratreff
2015	Standard	(Switzerland) Hans-Peter Brosch	(Switzerland) Michael Frey	(Switzerland) Oliver Kuenzler	Juratreff
2015	Production	(Switzerland) Remo Schraner	(Switzerland) Rolf Minder	(Switzerland) Beat Eichelberger	Juratreff
2015	Classic	(Switzerland) Eric Pochon	(Switzerland) Carlo Mischler	(Switzerland) Massimo Bonaldo	Juratreff
2015	Revolver	(Switzerland) Marco Derrer	(Switzerland) Ferdinand Berger	(Switzerland) Bramwell Zürcher	Juratreff

=== Lady category ===
Year	Division	Gold	Silver	Bronze	Venue
2011	Production	(Switzerland) Christine Burkhalter	(Switzerland)	(Switzerland)	
2013	Production	(Switzerland) Christine Burkhalter	(Switzerland)	(Switzerland)	
2014	Production	(Switzerland) Christine Burkhalter	(Switzerland)	(Switzerland)	
2015	Production	(Switzerland) Christine Burkhalter	(Switzerland)	(Switzerland)	
2016	Standard	(Switzerland) Christine Burkhalter	(Switzerland)	(Switzerland)	
