= Swiss Dynamic Shooting Federation =

Sports governing body in Switzerland

- Schweizer Verband für Dynamisches Schiessen (German), Fédération Suisse de Tir Dynamique (French), Ferdazione Svizzera di Tiro Dinamico (Italian).
- Formation: 20 November 1976
- Parent organization: International Practical Shooting Confederation
- Website: ipsc.ch

Swiss Dynamic Shooting Federation (SVDS) is the Swiss association for practical shooting under the International Practical Shooting Confederation. Switzerland hosted the first IPSC Handgun World Shoot in 1975.

== See also ==
- Swiss Handgun Championship
- Swiss Shooting Sport Federation, another shooting sport organization based in Switzerland
