= Maria Gushchina =

Russian sport shooter

Maria Guschina
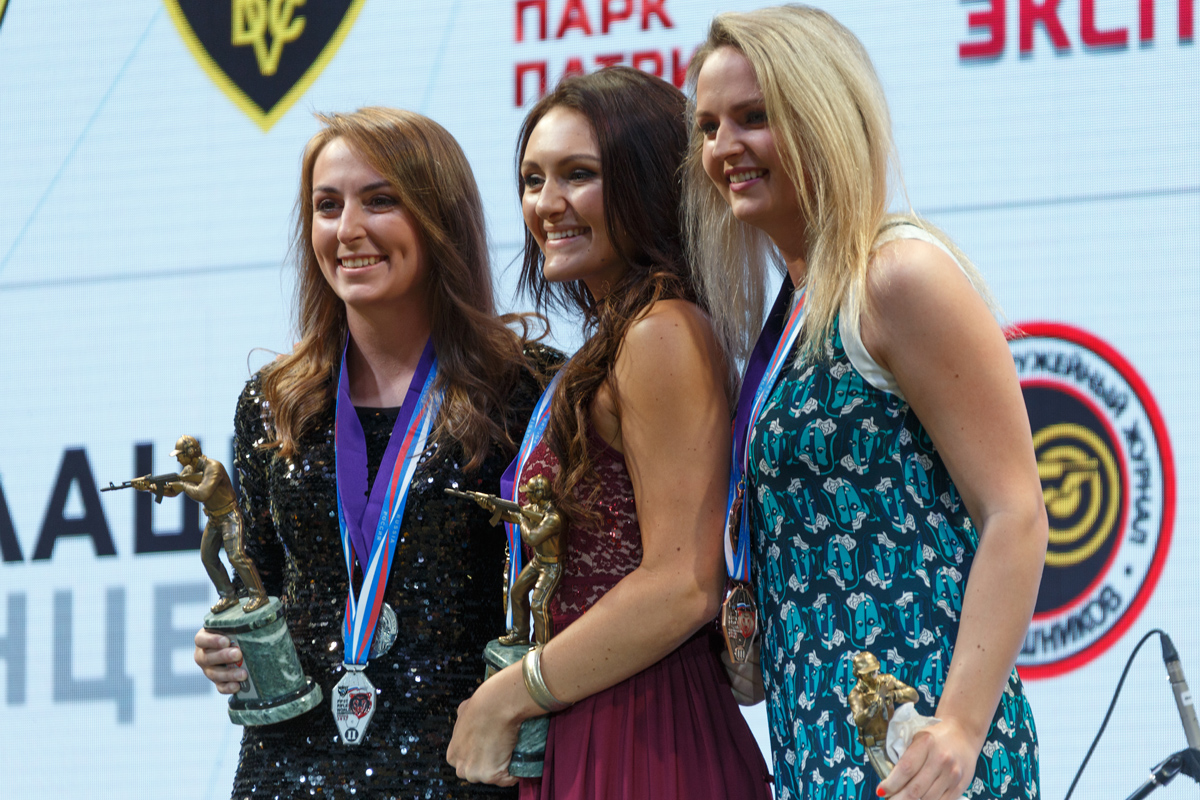
- Maria Gushchina (to the right) receiving the bronze medal at the 2017 IPSC Rifle World Shoot

Personal information
- Born: 1995 (age 30–31)
Medal record
IPSC
Representing Russia
IPSC Handgun World Shoot
Gold medal – first place	2011 Rhodes	Lady Production
Gold medal – first place	2014 Frostproof	Lady Production
Gold medal – first place	2017 Châteauroux	Lady Production
IPSC Russian Handgun Championship
Gold medal – first place	2010	Lady Standard
Gold medal – first place	2011	Lady Production
Gold medal – first place	2012	Lady Production
Silver medal – second place	2013	Production
Gold medal – first place	2013	Lady Production
Silver medal – second place	2014	Production
Gold medal – first place	2014	Lady Production
Silver medal – second place	2015	Production
Gold medal – first place	2015	Lady Production
IPSC Rifle World Shoot
Bronze medal – third place	2017 Moscow	Lady Open
IPSC European Rifle Championship
Silver medal – second place	2015 Bükk	Lady Open

Maria Guschina is a Russian sport shooter with three IPSC Handgun World Shoot titles (2011, 2014 and 2017) in the Lady Production Division. In addition to being a dominant shooter in the Lady category, she has also asserted herself strongly in the Overall category against male shooters in several major IPSC Level 3 events and above. She made an impressive performance at the 2017 World Shoot when she both came 1st in the Lady category in Production and in 6th place in Production Overall with a score of 98.23% of match winner Ben Stoeger. The production division was also the division with the toughest competition and the largest number of participants. Maria has also proven herself in practical rifle, taking bronze in the 2017 IPSC Rifle World Shoot in the Open Lady category and second in the 2015 IPSC European Rifle Championship.
