= IPSC French Handgun Championship =

French sport shooting competition

The IPSC French Handgun Championship is an IPSC level 3 championship held once a year by the French Shooting Federation.

== Champions ==
The following is a list of current and previous champions.

=== Overall category ===
Year	Division	Gold	Silver	Bronze	Venue
2007	Open	(France) Eric Grauffel	(France) Emile Obriot	(France) Rémy Deville	
2007	Standard	(France) Eddy Testa	(France) Frédéric Viaud	(France) Julien Boit	
2007	Production	(France) Stéphane Quertinier	(France) Christophe Pichenot	(France) Marc Donot	

=== Lady category ===
Year	Division	Gold	Silver	Bronze	Venue
2007	Open	(France) Jessica Loore	(France) Stella Fourret Poncet	(France)	
2007	Standard	(France) Mireille Bizouarn	(France) Christina Barros	(France) Glynis Raclot	
2007	Production	(France) Laetitia Daguenel	(France) Juliette Obriot	(France) Karine Gudin	

=== Junior category ===
Year	Division	Gold	Silver	Bronze	Venue
2012	Production	(France) Christophe Gougis	(France) Luc Burgada	(France) Margaux Nycz	
2015	Production	(France) Baptiste B Felt	(France) Georges G Marye	(France) Robin R Bohain	

=== Senior category ===
Year	Division	Gold	Silver	Bronze	Venue
2007	Open	(France) Thierry Obriot	(France) Philippe Gibert	(France) Alain Tarrade	
2007	Standard	(France) Jean-Michel Viaud	(France) Christian Cutaya	(France) Philippe Gateau	
2007	Production	(France) Pierre Coves	(France) Michel Evesque	(France) Jean-François Galmes	
2008	Open	(France) Philippe Gibert	(France) Thierry Obriot	(France) Christian De Bersaques	
2008	Standard	(France) PhilippeGateau	(France) Dominique Jondreville	(France) Jean Laurent	
2008	Production	(France) Gabriel Gassama	(France) Jean-Louis Boucaut	(France) Jean-Michel Chretien	
2012	Open	(France) Thierry Obriot	(France) Renaud Montargot	(France) Eric Bizouarn	
2012	Standard	(France) Philippe Da-Ros	(France) Gérard Raclot	(France) Jean-Marc Clot	
2012	Production	(France) Pierre Veziat	(France) Michel Nasso	(France) Philippe Merchica	
2014	Open	(France) Thierry Obriot	(France) Jean-Luc J Desagneaux	(France)	
2014	Standard	(France) Philippe P Da-Ros	(France) Jean Pierre J Colombini	(France) Gerard G Goli	
2014	Production	(France) Markus M Meichtry	(France) Jean-Paul J Cassignac	(France)	
2014	Classic	(France) Michel M Nestolat	(France) Jo Gerard	(France) Georges G Dazzi	
2014	Revolver	(France) Pascal P Decarpignies	(France) Ernst E Schmocker	(France) Pascal P Tournier	
2015	Open	(France) Jose Maria J Guerra	(France) Jean-Luc J Desagneaux	(France) Eric E Bizouarn	
2015	Standard	(France) Fernandez-Bustillo, Eduardo E	(France) Philippe P Da Ros	(France) Luca L Levis	
2015	Production	(France) Pierre P Veziat	(France) Thierry T Cardot	(France) Michel M Nasso	
2015	Classic	(France) Michel M Nestolat	(France) Marco M Tiberi	(France) Pascal P Decarpignies	
2016	Open	(France) Jean Luc J Desagneaux	(France) Eric E Bizouarn	(France) Daniel D Balesi	
2016	Standard	(France) Philippe P Da-Ros	(France) Christian C Vandenabeelle	(France) Philippe P Coquelle	
2016	Production	(France) Markus M Meichtry	(France) Pierre P Veziat	(France) Marco M Tiberi	
2016	Classic	(France) Michel M Nestolat	(France) Francisco F Rectoret Gomez	(France) Pascal P Decarpignies	

=== Super Senior category ===
Year	Division	Gold	Silver	Bronze	Venue
2012	Open	(France) Philippe Gibert	(France) Alain Tarrade	(France) Georges Dazzi	
2012	Standard	(France) Joel Gerard	(France) Michel Evesque	(France) Pierre Martin-Privat	
2012	Production	(France) Jean-Louis Boucaut	(France) Jean Farkas	(France) Philippe Latreille	
2014	Open	(France) Alain A Tarrade	(France) Philippe P Gibert	(France) Jean-Fran Pellegrini	
2014	Standard	(France) Pierre P Martin-Privat	(France) Jean-Pierre J Camugli	(France) Giampaolo G Barillari	
2014	Production	(France) Jean Louis J Boucaut	(France) Camille C Verlinde	(France) Michel M Evesque	
2015	Open	(France) Thierry T Obriot	(France) Alain A Tarrade	(France) Philippe P Gibert	
2015	Standard	(France) Pierre P Martin Privat	(France) Georges G Dazzi	(France) Edo E Damià	
2015	Production	(France) Jean-Michel J Viaud	(France) Camille C Verlinde	(France) Marcel M Smeers	
2015	Classic	(France) Joel J Gerard	(France) Pierluigi P Faveto	(France) Gerard G Courault	
2016	Open	(France) Thierry T Obriot	(France) Alain A Tarrade	(France) Philippe P Gibert	
2016	Standard	(France) Bernard B Motte	(France) Pierre P Martin-Privat	(France) Patrick P Roton	
2016	Production	(France) Jean-Michel J Viaud	(France) Christian C De Bersaques	(France) Dominique D Jondreville	
2016	Classic	(France) Joel J Gerard	(France) Georges G Dazzi	(France) Rudy R Jouet	

== See also ==
- IPSC French Rifle Championship
- IPSC French Shotgun Championship
