= Hodonice (Znojmo District) =

- Municipality
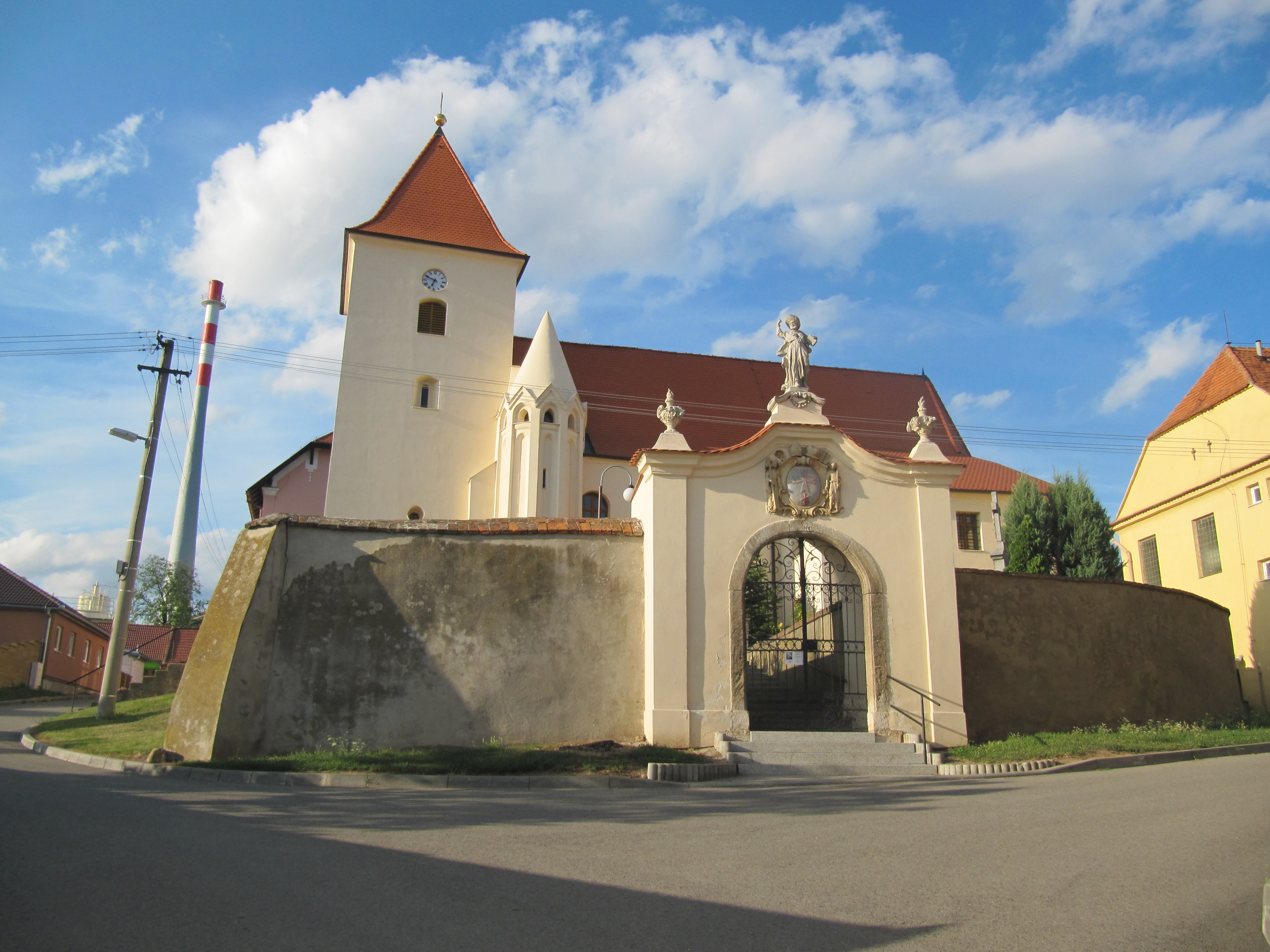
- Church of Saint James the Great

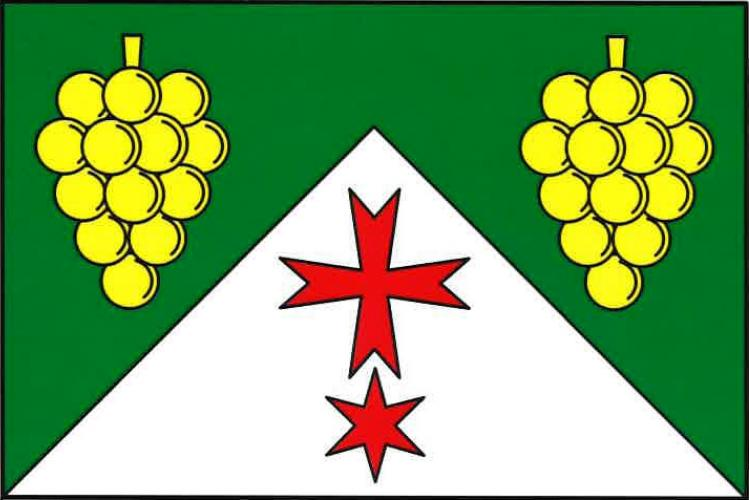
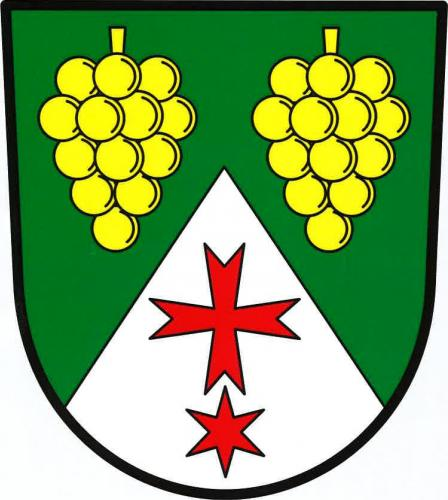
- Flag Coat of arms

- Location in the Czech Republic
- Coordinates: 48°50′13″N 16°9′48″E
- Country: Czech Republic
- Region: South Moravian
- District: Znojmo
- First mentioned: 1281

Area
  - Total: 8.72 km^{2} (3.37 sq mi)
- Elevation: 205 m (673 ft)

Population (2026-01-01)
  - Total: 1,764
  - Density: 202/km^{2} (524/sq mi)
- Time zone: UTC+1 (CET)
  - Summer (DST): UTC+2 (CEST)
- Postal code: 671 25
- Website: www.hodonice.cz

Hodonice is a municipality and village in Znojmo District in the South Moravian Region of the Czech Republic. It has about 1,800 inhabitants.

Hodonice lies approximately 10 kilometres (6 mi) east of Znojmo, 52 km (32 mi) south-west of Brno, and 188 km (117 mi) south-east of Prague.

== Demographics ==
Historical population
Year	Pop.	±%
1869	805	—
1880	734	−8.8%
1890	690	−6.0%
1900	913	+32.3%
1910	876	−4.1%
1921	916	+4.6%
1930	1,009	+10.2%
1950	863	−14.5%
1961	884	+2.4%
1970	814	−7.9%
1980	1,268	+55.8%
1991	1,334	+5.2%
2001	1,507	+13.0%
2011	1,766	+17.2%
2021	1,672	−5.3%
Source: Censuses
