= Simon Racaza =

Filipino-American sport shooter (born 1980)

Simon "J.J." Racaza
Personal information
- National team: United States
- Born: 16 April 1980 (age 46)
- Employer: United States Department of Homeland Security
Medal record
IPSC
Representing United States
IPSC Handgun World Shoot
Silver medal – second place	2011 Rhodes	Open
Silver medal – second place	2014 Frostproof	Production
Silver medal – second place	2017 Châteauroux	Open
Gold medal – first place	2022 Pattaya	Production Optics

Simon "J.J." Racaza (born April 16, 1980, in Cebu City, Philippines) is a Filipino-American sport shooter.

== Biography ==
Racaza took silver in the Open division at the 2011 IPSC Handgun World Shoot and silver in the Production division at the 2014 Handgun World Shoot. He was also the number one qualifier of the US Gold Team for the 2010 ISSF World Shooting Championships. In 2010, Racaza competed in season one of History Channel's Top Shot marksmanship competition, finishing in third place.

Racaza graduated from Seton Hall University with a degree in Business Management Information Systems. He formerly worked as an agent for the Department of Homeland Security with the Federal Air Marshal Service. He is also a double Grand Master in the USPSA. Racaza is part of Team Limcat, a team of professional competitive shooters sponsored by the company of the same name. Limcat even designed a gun specifically for Racaza, called the Razorcat Racing Gun.

During one episode of the second season of the show, Racaza appeared with Blake Miguez as trainers for one of the challenges.
