= Ricardo López Tugendhat =

Ecuadorian shooter (born 1977)

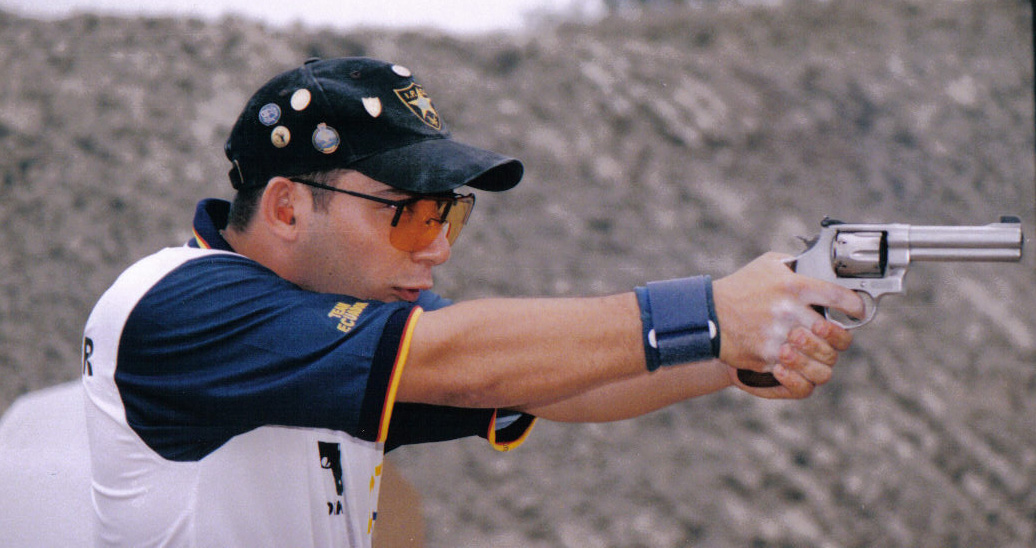
- Ricardo López

Personal information
- Born: 24 May 1977 (age 49)
Medal record
IPSC
Representing Ecuador
IPSC Handgun World Shoot
Silver medal – second place	2005 Guayaquil	Revolver
Gold medal – first place	2008 Bali	Revolver
Gold medal – first place	2011 Rhodes	Revolver
Gold medal – first place	2014 Frostproof	Revolver

Ricardo López Tugendhat (born 24 May 1977) is a three time IPSC revolver World Champion (2008, 2011, 2014) from Ecuador. He was born in Quito in 1977. His father César López has served as his coach.
