= Shane Coley =

American practical sport shooter

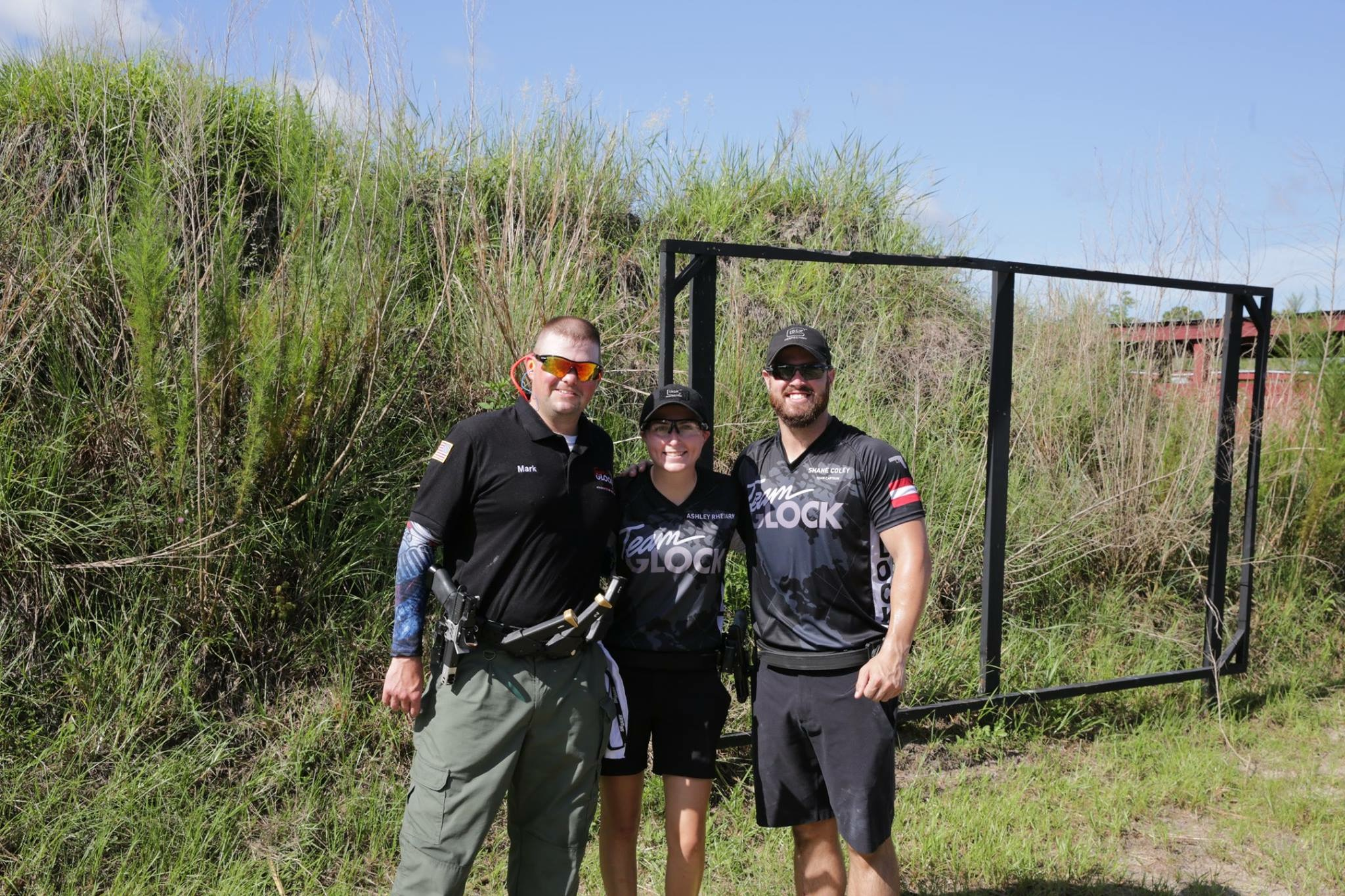
- Shane Coley at the 2017 IPSC US Handgun Championship
Medal record
IPSC
Representing United States
IPSC Handgun World Shoot - Individual
Bronze medal – third place	2008 Bali	Junior Open
Gold medal – first place	2011 Rhodes	Junior Open
Silver medal – second place	2014 Frostproof	Open
IPSC Handgun World Shoot - Teams
Gold medal – first place	2008 Bali	Junior Open Team
Gold medal – first place	2011 Rhodes	Junior Open Team
Gold medal – first place	2014 Frostproof	Open Team
IPSC US Handgun Championship
Gold medal – first place	2011 Columbia	Open
Gold medal – first place	2012 Frostproof	Open
Bronze medal – third place	2015 Frostproof	Standard

Shane Coley is an American practical sport shooter who took overall silver at the 2014 IPSC Handgun World Shoot in the Handgun Open division. Shane started shooting in 2005 at the age of 14, and in 2009 he became a part of the United States Army Marksmanship Unit. In 2012 he became the overall USPSA Handgun Nationals Open division champion, making him the youngest USPSA National Champion after KC Eusebio.
