= IPSC Czech Handgun Championship =

Shooting competition

The IPSC Czech Handgun Championship is an IPSC level 3 championship held once a year by the Practical Shooting Association of the Czech Republic.

== Champions ==
The following is a list of current and previous champions.

=== Overall category ===
Year	Division	Gold	Silver	Bronze
2003	Open	(Czech Republic) Martin Kamenicek	(Czech Republic) Miroslav Havlíček	(Czech Republic) Jakub Adamek
2003	Standard	(Czech Republic) Roman Podlesak	(Czech Republic) Adam Tyc	(Czech Republic) Petr Znamenacek
2003	Production	(Czech Republic) Vaclav Vinduska	(Czech Republic) Petr Smutny	(Czech Republic) Ales Vondracek
2003	Modified	(Czech Republic) Vaclav Martinek	(Czech Republic) Josef Rakusan Jun.	(Czech Republic) Pavel Sikula
2003	Revolver	(Czech Republic) Zdenek Nemecek	(Czech Republic) Lumir Safranek	(Czech Republic) Jiri Jedlicka

=== Lady category ===
Year	Division	Gold	Silver	Bronze
2003	Open Lady	(Czech Republic) Lenka Horejsi	(Czech Republic) Ludmila Strizikova	(Czech Republic) Monika Safrankova
2003	Standard Lady	(Czech Republic) Michaela Horejsi	(Czech Republic) Milena Cerna	(Czech Republic) Iva Dlouha

=== Junior category ===
Year	Division	Gold	Silver	Bronze
2002	Standard Junior			(Czech Republic) Adam Tyc
2003	Standard Junior	(Czech Republic) Adam Tyc	(Czech Republic) Zdenek Liehne	

=== Senior category ===
Year	Division	Gold	Silver	Bronze
2003	Open Senior	(Czech Republic) Miroslav Kamenicek	(Czech Republic)	(Czech Republic)
2003	Standard Senior	(Czech Republic) Zdenek Rataj	(Czech Republic) Josef Kyncl	(Czech Republic) Karel Vitek

== See also ==
- IPSC Czech Rifle Championship
- IPSC Czech Shotgun Championship
