= Hilde Nakling =

Norwegian shooter (born 1982)

Personal information
- Born: 4 May 1982 (age 44)
Medal record
IPSC
Representing Norway
IPSC Handgun World Shoot
Gold medal – first place	2014 Frostproof	Lady Standard
Bronze medal – third place	2017 Châteauroux	Lady Standard
IPSC European Handgun Championship
Bronze medal – third place	2010 Belgrade	Lady Standard

Hilde Nakling (born 4. May 1982) is a Norwegian shooter who during the 2014 IPSC World Shoot claimed the title as World Champion in the Lady Standard Division. She is the daughter of Vidar Nakling, 1980 IPSC European Champion and an active shooter until 1996. Hilde visited the shooting range for the first time already three months old, and gradually got to try various small firearms. During the early years she only attended the range once or twice a year, and it was not until she took a beginners course in 2005 that she became seriously hooked. Since 2006 she has competed actively. To prepare for the 2014 World Shoot she quit her day job as a nurse at the Oslo University Hospital, and continued to work shifts as a nurse on the pediatric ward.

== Merits ==
- 1st place 2014 IPSC Handgun World Shoot, Lady Standard
- 3rd place 2010 IPSC European Handgun Championship, Lady Standard
- 5th place 2011 IPSC Handgun World Shoot, Lady Standard
- 5th place 2008 IPSC Handgun World Shoot, Lady Standard
- 15th place overall 2014 IPSC Nordic Handgun Championship, Standard
