= Eduardo de Cobos =

Spanish sport shooter

Eduardo De Cobos Abreu
Personal information
- Nationality: (Spain) Spanish
- Born: 20 August 1974 (age 51)
- Occupation(s): IPSC shooter, firearms instructor

Sport
- Team: Team Beretta (2019-current)
Medal record
IPSC
Representing Spain
IPSC Handgun World Shoot
Bronze medal – third place	2017 Châteauroux	Production
IPSC European Handgun Championship
Bronze medal – third place	2004 Tábor	Standard
Gold medal – first place	2010 Belgrade	Production
Gold medal – first place	2016 Felsőtárkány	Production
IPSC Spanish Handgun Championship
Gold medal – first place	1997	Open
Gold medal – first place	1998	Open
Gold medal – first place	1999	Open
Gold medal – first place	2000	Open
Gold medal – first place	2002	Open
Gold medal – first place	2005	Standard
Gold medal – first place	2006	Production
Gold medal – first place	2008	Production
Gold medal – first place	2009	Production
Gold medal – first place	2010	Production
Gold medal – first place	2011	Production
Gold medal – first place	2012	Production
Gold medal – first place	2013	Production
Gold medal – first place	2014	Production
Gold medal – first place	2016	Production

Eduardo De Cobos (born 20 August 1974) is a Spanish sport shooter and firearms instructor who took bronze in the Production division at the 2017 IPSC Handgun World Shoot in Châteauroux, France. He also has two gold and one bronze medal from the IPSC European Handgun Championships. Eduardo started shooting as a weekend activity with his father between 1990 and 1992. He had his breakthrough in 1997 taking his first IPSC Spanish Handgun Championship title, and today has over 15 Spanish Handgun titles. Eduardo placed 6th in the Production division at the 2008 IPSC Handgun World Shoot in Bali.
