= IPSC Czech Rifle Championship =

Annual IPSC level 3 championship

The IPSC Czech Handgun Championship is an IPSC level 3 championship held once a year by the Practical Shooting Association of the Czech Republic.

== Champions ==
The following is a list of current and previous champions.

=== Overall category ===
Year	Division	Gold	Silver	Bronze	Venue
2006	Open	(Czech Republic) Vaclav Vinduska	(Czech Republic) Jiri Jedlicka	(Czech Republic) Petr Smutny	Žalany, Teplice
2006	Standard	(Czech Republic) Stanislav Glos	(Czech Republic) Vitezslav Kubac	(Czech Republic) Roman Sedy	Žalany, Teplice

=== Senior category ===
Year	Division	Gold	Silver	Bronze	Venue
2006	Open	(Czech Republic) Vaclav Martinek	(Czech Republic) Vladimir Polivka	(Czech Republic) Lumir Safranek	Žalany, Teplice

== See also ==
- IPSC Czech Handgun Championship
