= Eric Grauffel =

French sport shooter

Éric Grauffel
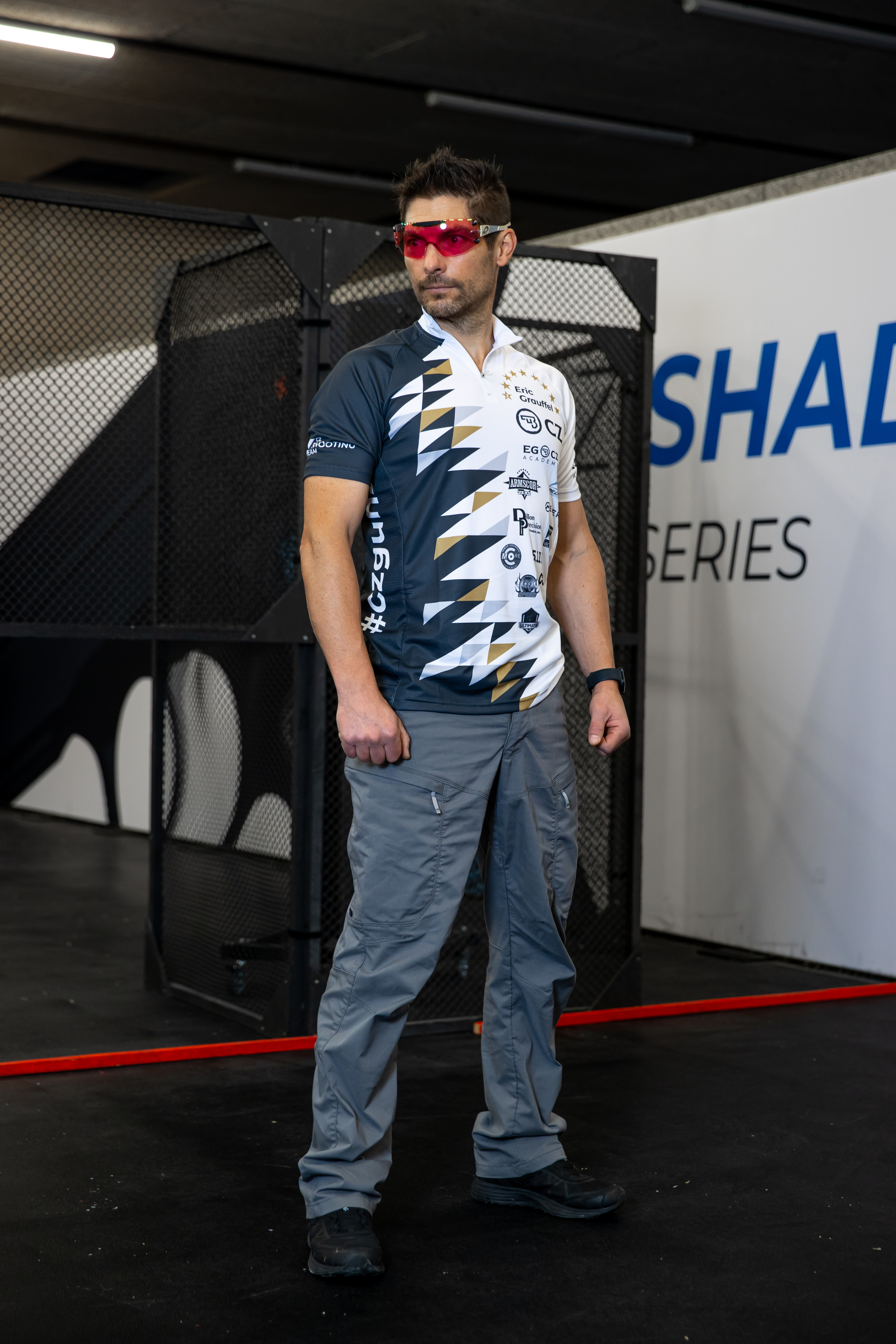
- Eric Grauffel at the 2007 European Handgun Championship, Cheval-Blanc, France

Personal information
- Nationality: (France) French
- Born: December 8, 1979 (age 46) Quimper, France
- Occupation(s): IPSC shooter, firearms instructor
- Website: ericgrauffel.com

Sport
- Team: Team CZ (2019-current); Team Tanfoglio/Armscor (?-2018 (over 20 years))
Medal record
IPSC
Representing France
IPSC Handgun World Shoot
Silver medal – second place	1996 Brasilia	Open Junior
Gold medal – first place	1999 Cebu	Open Junior
Gold medal – first place	1999 Cebu	Open
Gold medal – first place	2002 Pietersburg	Open
Gold medal – first place	2005 Guayaquil	Open
Gold medal – first place	2008 Bali	Open
Gold medal – first place	2011 Rhodes	Open
Gold medal – first place	2014 Frostproof	Production
Gold medal – first place	2017 Châteauroux	Standard
Gold medal – first place	2022 Pataya	Production
IPSC European Handgun Championship
Silver medal – second place	1995 Gotland	Open Junior
Gold medal – first place	1998 Crete	Open
Gold medal – first place	1998 Crete	Open Junior
Gold medal – first place	2001 Philippsburg	Open
Gold medal – first place	2004 Tábor	Open
Gold medal – first place	2007 Cheval Blanc	Open
Gold medal – first place	2010 Belgrade	Open
Gold medal – first place	2013 Barcelos	Production
Gold medal – first place	2016 Felsőtárkány	Standard
Gold medal – first place	2019 Belgrade	Production
Gold medal – first place	2023 Corinth	Production
IPSC French Handgun Championship
Gold medal – first place	1995	Open Junior
Gold medal – first place	1996	Open
Gold medal – first place	1997	Open
Gold medal – first place	1998	Open
Gold medal – first place	2000	Open
Gold medal – first place	2000	Standard
Gold medal – first place	2001	Open
Gold medal – first place	2002	Open
Gold medal – first place	2003	Open
Gold medal – first place	2004	Open
Gold medal – first place	2005	Open
Gold medal – first place	2006	Open
Gold medal – first place	2007	Open
Gold medal – first place	2008	Open
Gold medal – first place	2009	Open
Gold medal – first place	2010	Open
Gold medal – first place	2011	Open
Gold medal – first place	2012
Gold medal – first place	2013
Gold medal – first place	2014
Gold medal – first place	2015
Gold medal – first place	2016
Gold medal – first place	2017
Gold medal – first place	2018
Gold medal – first place	2019
Gold medal – first place	2021
Gold medal – first place	2022

Éric Grauffel is a French sport shooter and firearms instructor with ten overall IPSC Handgun World Champion titles and one Junior World Champion title. He is known for having an unprecedented winning streak, and has won 191 IPSC President Medals. He is the son of the French national team trainer Gérard Grauffel. Additionally he has won the IPSC European Handgun Championships seven times.

== Biography ==
Born and raised in Quimper, France (on the West coast), Eric still resides there when he is not traveling the world competing. He began shooting with an air gun at the age of eight. At age 10 he shot his first pistol and within a year Eric was competing. He won his first French National Championship at age 15 and his first world title at 18. Eric dedicates as many as three hours a day, five days a week in preparation for his sport. Each day he goes through a regimen of shooting and physical training. "This sport is basically technique, to be as skilled as possible you need to be like a thinking-robot."

In practical shooting, competitors are required to take shots from all different positions, locations and angles. Shots often come on the move or at moving targets. Because all shooters are highly skilled, any edge one of the top competitors can get through physical training is very important. In addition to several practice sessions, Eric also spends several hours reloading each day. Grauffel says reloading his own ammo is much more cost-efficient and many competitors do this because it allows them to personally control everything about their ammunition.

== Endorsements ==
Grauffel is a member of CZ Shooting Team, and has previously been sponsored by Tanfoglio.

== See also ==
- Ben Stoeger, American sport shooter
- Max Michel, American sport shooter
- Jorge Ballesteros, Spanish sport shooter
