= Max Michel =

American action shooting competitor (born 1981)

Maxient John Jr. Michel
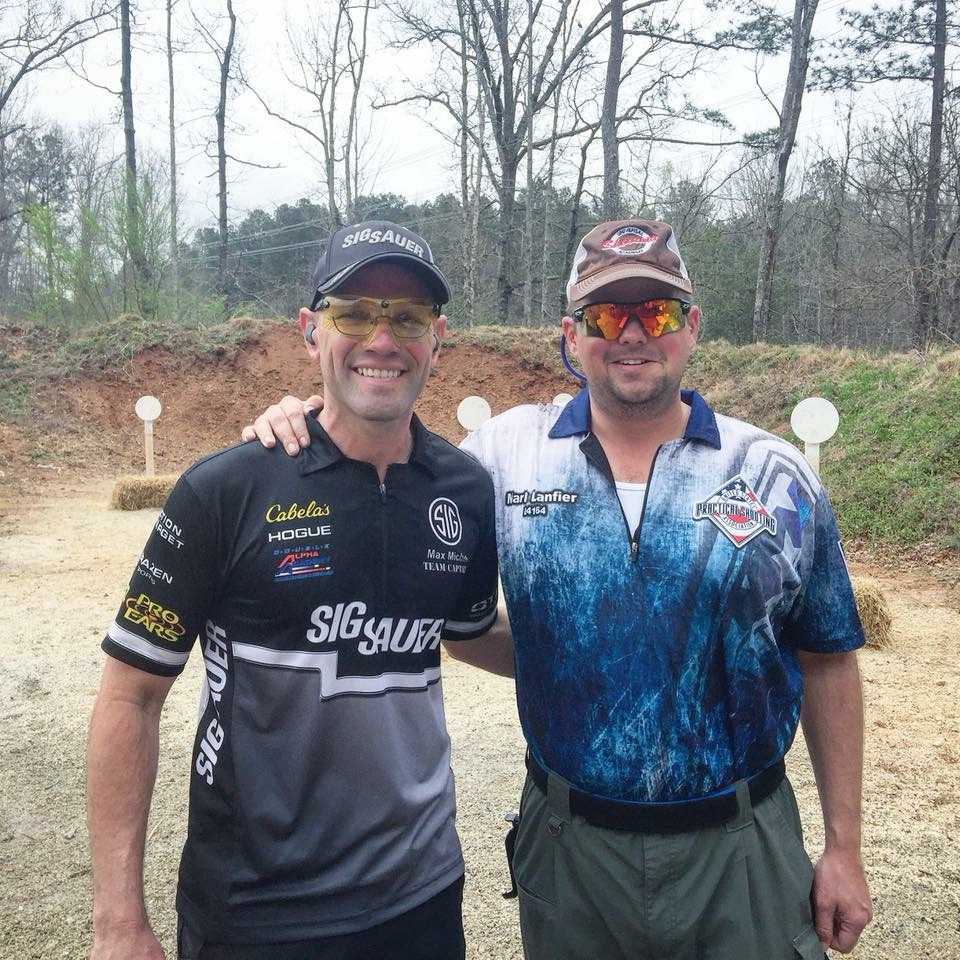

Personal information
- Nationality: (United States) American
- Born: 15 December 1981 (age 44)
- Occupation(s): IPSC shooter, firearms instructor
- Website: maxmichel.com
Medal record
IPSC
Representing United States
IPSC Handgun World Shoot
Bronze medal – third place	2008 Bali	Open
Gold medal – first place	2014 Frostproof	Open
IPSC US Handgun Championship
Silver medal – second place	2012 Frostproof	Open
Silver medal – second place	2015 Frostproof	Open
Gold medal – first place	2016 Frostproof	Open

Maxient John Jr. Michel (born 15 December 1981) is an action shooting competitor from the US. He became IPSC Handgun World Champion in the Open division in 2014. He is also the only seven-time winner of the Steel Challenge World Speed Shooting Championships and the only competitor to win it 4 times in a row (2005, 2007, 2009, 2013, 2014, 2015 and 2016). Max began shooting when he was just 5 years old, and has served in the U.S. Army for 10 years (1999 - 2009) as a shooter and trainer. He is also featured on the Hot Shots TV series, and is sponsored by SIG Sauer. Max uses a highly modified Sig Sauer P320 tuned specifically for him by The Sig Armorer.

== Merits ==
- 2014 IPSC Open World Champion (XVII, USA)
- Seven times Steel Challenge World Speed Shooting Champion (2016, 2015, 2014, 2013, 2009, 2007 and 2005)
- Eight times USPSA National Champion (2014, 2013, 2011, 2009, 2007, 2006, 2005 and 2004)
- Four time US Steel Challenge National Champion (2014, 2011, 2009 and 2008)
- Two time Pro-Am Champion (2012 and 2013)
- The only shooter along with Christian Sailer who has won all USPSA Area Championships in the same season (2010)

== See also ==
- Ben Stoeger, American sport shooter
- Eric Grauffel, French sport shooter
- Jorge Ballesteros, Spanish sport shooter
