= Robert Vogel (marksman) =

American competition shooter / child predator

Personal information
- Born: October 7, 1981 (age 45)
Medal record
IPSC
Representing United States
IPSC Handgun World Shoot
Bronze medal – third place	2008 Bali	Production
Gold medal – first place	2011 Rhodes	Production
Silver medal – second place	2014 Frostproof	Standard
IPSC US Handgun Championship
Bronze medal – third place	2009 Frostproof	Production
Silver medal – second place	2012 Frostproof	Standard
Gold medal – first place	2016 Frostproof	Standard

Robert "Bob" Gordon Vogel (born 7 October 1981) is a professional marksman, competition shooter, and National/World champion. He is the only Law Enforcement Officer ever to win World and National Championships in the Practical Pistol Disciplines of IPSC, USPSA and IDPA.

Altogether Vogel won 24 USA National Championships and 3 World Championships. He has also trained elite Law Enforcement and Military Units including the FBI, Navy Seals, Marine Raiders and Delta Force. .

== Achievements ==
- IPSC World Champion (Production)
- IDPA World Champion (Stock Pistol)
- 4x USPSA National Champion (Production & Limited 10)
- 6x IDPA National Champion (Stock, Enhanced, Custom)
- 6x IDPA Indoor National Champion (Stock & Enhanced)
- IPSC National Champion (Production)
- 3x Pro-Am Professional Champion (Limited & Open)
- 3x IDPA Carolina Cup Champion
- 6x USPSA Area Champion (Areas 5,6,8)
- 11x Indiana State Champion (USPSA & IDPA)
- 7x Ohio State Champion (USPSA & IDPA)
- 7x Michigan State Champion (USPSA & IDPA)
- 7x IDPA Great Lakes Regional Champion

=== Legal Issues ===
In 2025, he pleaded guilty to several charges involving minors. They presented as 19 but turned out to be 17. (Auglaize County).
