= Jorge Ballesteros =

Spanish sport shooter (1983–2023)

Jorge Ballesteros Fernández
Personal information
- Nationality: Spanish
- Born: 27 May 1983 San Sebastián, Spain
- Died: 10 January 2023 (aged 39) Madrid, Spain
- Occupation(s): IPSC shooter, firearms instructor
- Website: jorgeballesteros.com

Sport
- Team: Team BUL (2019–2023)
Medal record
IPSC
Representing Spain
IPSC Handgun World Shoot
Bronze medal – third place	2002 Pietersburg	Junior Open
Bronze medal – third place	2005 Guayaquil	Open
Gold medal – first place	2017 Châteauroux	Open
IPSC European Handgun Championship
Gold medal – first place	2013 Barcelos	Open
Gold medal – first place	2016 Felsőtárkány	Open
Gold medal – first place	2019 Belgrade	Open
IPSC Spanish Handgun Championship
Gold medal – first place	2005	Open
Gold medal – first place	2006	Open
Gold medal – first place	2006	Standard
Gold medal – first place	2008	Open
Gold medal – first place	2009	Open
Gold medal – first place	2010	Open
Gold medal – first place	2011	Open
Gold medal – first place	2012	Open
Gold medal – first place	2013	Open
Gold medal – first place	2015	Open
Gold medal – first place	2016	Open

Jorge Ballesteros Fernández (27 May 1983 – 10 January 2023) was a Spanish sport shooter who took the gold medal overall in the Open division at the 2017 IPSC Handgun World Shoot. At the 2005 World Shoot he took the overall bronze medal in the Open division, and in 2002 he took the bronze medal in the Junior category. He also won two European Handgun Championship Open division gold medals (2013 and 2016), and won the Spanish Handgun Championship 12 times.

On 11 January 2023, it was announced that Ballesteros had been found in his car with a gunshot wound to his head. He was rushed to the hospital, but died from his injuries. He was 39.
