= IPSC European Handgun Championship =

International sport shooting competition

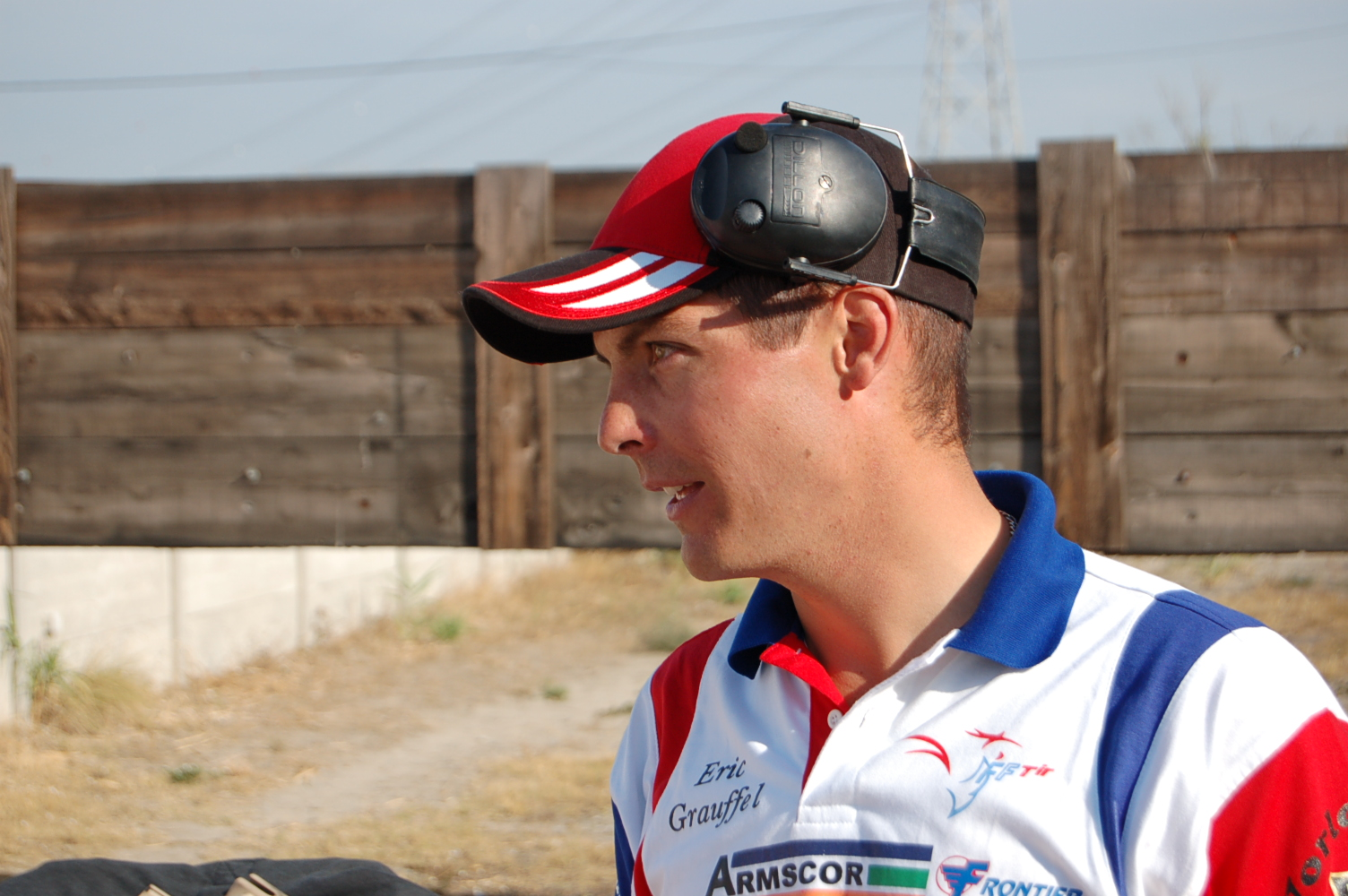
Eric Grauffel at the 2007 European Handgun Championship, Cheval-Blanc, France.

The IPSC European Handgun Championship is an IPSC level 4 championship hosted every third year in Europe.

== History ==
- 1979 Brussels, Belgium
- 1980 May Oslo, Norway
- 1981 Uppsala, Sweden
- 1982 Warminster, United Kingdom
- 1984 Paris, France
- 1985 Vienna, Austria
- 1987 October 13–17, Bisley, United Kingdom
- 1989 Reims, France
- 1992 Barcelona, Spain
- 1995 Gotland, Sweden
- 1998 September 4–13, Crete, Greece
- 2001 Philippsburg, Germany
- 2004 Tábor, Opařany, Czech Republic
- 2007 Cheval Blanc, France
- 2010 September 7–18, Belgrade, Serbia
- 2013 September 5–6, Barcelos, Portugal
- 2016 October 3–8, Felsőtárkány, Hungary
- 2019 September 9–13, Belgrade, Serbia
- 2023 September 24–30, Corinth, Greece
- 2026 May 30 –June 13, Buzsák, Hungary

== Champions ==
The following is a list of current and past IPSC European Handgun Champions.

=== Overall category ===
| Year | Division | Gold | Silver | Bronze | Venue |
|---|---|---|---|---|---|
| 1979 | | | | | Brussels, Belgium |
| 1980 | | (Norway) Vidar Nakling | (United Kingdom) Bob Chittlebourgh | (Norway) Terje Lund | Oslo, Norway |
| 1981 | | (United Kingdom) Bob Dunkley | (Norway) Vidar Nakling | (Norway) Terje Lund | Uppsala, Sweden |
| 1982 | | (United Kingdom) Bob Dunkley | | | Warminster, United Kingdom |
| 1984 | | (United Kingdom) Bob Dunkley | | | Paris, France |
| 1985 | | | | | Vienna, Austria |
| 1987 | | (Switzerland) Marc Heim | | | Bisley, United Kingdom |
| 1989 | | (France) Jean-Claude Bouchut | | | Reims, France |
| 1992 | | (Norway) Flemming Pedersen | | | Barcelona, Spain |
| 1995 | Open | (United Kingdom) Angus Hobdell | (Norway) Henning Wallgren | (United Kingdom) Dean Notley | Gotland, Sweden |
| 1998 | Open | (France) Eric Grauffel | (United Kingdom) Angus Hobdell | (Norway) Henning Wallgren | Crete, Greece |
| 1998 | Modified | (Italy) Mario Riillo | (United Kingdom) Jeremy White | (Spain) Diego Cruz Membrivez | Crete, Greece |
| 1998 | Standard | (Slovakia) Marian Vysny | (Italy) Esterino Magli | (Italy) Valter Tranquilli | Crete, Greece |
| 2001 | Open | (France) Eric Grauffel | (Belgium) Frank Witters | (Germany) Christian Wilda | Philippsburg, Germany |
| 2001 | Modified | (Italy) Edoardo Buticchi | (Germany) Juergen Flass | (Germany) Georg Fabricius | Philippsburg, Germany |
| 2001 | Standard | (Slovakia) Marian Vysny | (Spain) Juan Carlos Jaime | (Italy) Adriano Ciro Santarcangel | Philippsburg, Germany |
| 2001 | Production | (Czech Republic) Jan Knapp | (Italy) Stefano Iacomini | (Slovakia) Zdenko Meniar | Philippsburg, Germany |
| 2001 | Revolver | (Germany) Guenther Knaus | (Germany) Markus Schneider | Siegfried Mayer | Philippsburg, Germany |
| 2004 | Open | (France) Eric Grauffel | (Czech Republic) Martin Kamenicek | (Spain) Jorge Ballesteros | Tabor Oparany, Czech Republic |
| 2004 | Modified | (Italy) Edoardo Buticchi | (Germany) Georg Fabricius | (Germany) Juergen Flass | Tabor Oparany, Czech Republic |
| 2004 | Standard | (Italy) Adriano Ciro Santareagelo | (Denmark) Ralf K.Jensen | (Spain) Eduardo de Cobos | Tabor Oparany, Czech Republic |
| 2004 | Production | (Czech Republic) Adam Tyc | (Czech Republic) Petr Smutny | (Czech Republic) Ales Vondracek | Tabor Oparany, Czech Republic |
| 2004 | Revolver | (Netherlands) Bjoern Dietrich | (France) Markus Meichtry | (Austria) Hermann Kirchweger | Tabor Oparany, Czech Republic |
| 2007 | Open | (France) Eric Grauffel | (Spain) Jorge Ballesteros | (Netherlands) Saul Kirsch | Cheval Blanc, France |
| 2007 | Modified | (Czech Republic) Zdenek Henes | (Italy) Giuseppe Todaro | (Germany) Juergen Flass | Cheval Blanc, France |
| 2007 | Standard | (Czech Republic) Josef Rakusan | (France) Julien Boit | (Germany) Gregory Midgley | Cheval Blanc, France |
| 2007 | Production | (Czech Republic) Adam Tyc | (Slovakia) Marian Wysny | (Russia) Vitaly Kryuchin | Cheval Blanc, France |
| 2007 | Revolver | (Italy) Igor Rosa Brusin | (Switzerland) Marcus Meishtry | (Italy) Andrea Todeschini | Cheval Blanc, France |
| 2010 | Open | (France) Eric Grauffel | (Spain) Jorge Ballesteros | (Czech Republic) Martin Kamenicek | Belgrade, Serbia |
| 2010 | Modified | (Czech Republic) Zdenek Henes | (Italy) Davide Cerrato | (Italy) Roberto Vezzoli | Belgrade, Serbia |
| 2010 | Standard | (Spain) Juan Carlos Jaime | (Denmark) Ralf K. Jensen | (Hungary) György Batki | Belgrade, Serbia |
| 2010 | Production | (Spain) Eduardo de Cobos | (Finland) Matti Manni | (Serbia) Ljubisa Momcilovic | Belgrade, Serbia |
| 2010 | Revolver | (Germany) Sascha Back | (Germany) Markus Schneider | (Austria) Hermann Kirchweger | Belgrade, Serbia |
| 2013 | Open | (Spain) Jorge Ballesteros | (France) Emile Obriot | (Sweden) Lars-Tony Skoog | Barcelos, Portugal |
| 2013 | Standard | (Spain) Juan Carlos Jaime Diaz | (Czech Republic) Petr Znamenacek | (Italy) Cosimo Panetta | Barcelos, Portugal |
| 2013 | Production | (France) Eric Grauffel | (Finland) Matti Manni | (Serbia) Ljubisa Momcilovic | Barcelos, Portugal |
| 2013 | Classic | (Italy) Edoardo Roberto Buticchi | (Italy) Roberto Vezzoli | (Germany) Marijan Loch | Barcelos, Portugal |
| 2013 | Revolver | (Austria) Gerald Reiter | (Germany) Sascha Back | (Austria) Hermann Kirchweger | Barcelos, Portugal |
| 2016 | Open | (Spain) Jorge Ballesteros | (France) Emile Obriot | (Italy) Cosimo Panetta | Felsőtárkány, Hungary |
| 2016 | Standard | (France) Eric Grauffel | (Italy) Gregorio Tassone | (Czech Republic) Zdenek Liehne | Felsőtárkány, Hungary |
| 2016 | Production | (Spain) Eduardo de Cobos | (Czech Republic) Robin Sebo | (Serbia) Ljubisa Momcilovic | Felsőtárkány, Hungary |
| 2016 | Classic | (Germany) Gregory Midgley | (Italy) Edoardo Buticchi | (Slovenia) Robert Cernigoj | Felsőtárkány, Hungary |
| 2016 | Revolver | (Austria) Gerald Reiter | (Germany) Sascha Back | (Sweden) Kalle Halvarsson | Felsőtárkány, Hungary |
| 2019 | Production | (France) Eric Grauffel | (Serbia) Momčilović Ljubiša | (Russia) Maria Gushchina | Belgrade, Serbia |
| 2019 | Production Optics | (Czech Republic) Martin Kameníček | (Bulgaria) Alexander Koussev | (Slovakia) Andrej Hrnciarik | Belgrade, Serbia |
| 2019 | Open | (Spain) Jorge Ballesteros | (Czech Republic) Robin Šebo | (France) Emile Obriot | Belgrade, Serbia |
| 2019 | Classic | (Slovenia) Robert Cernigoj | (France) Julien Boit | (Germany) Gregory Midgley | Belgrade, Serbia |
| 2019 | Revolver | (Germany) Tom Kronawitter | (Austria) Gerald Reiter | (Denmark) Henrik F. Nielsen | Belgrade, Serbia |
| 2019 | Standard | (Czech Republic) Josef Rakušan | (Italy) Giacomo Bolzoni | (Czech Republic) Zdeněk Liehne | Belgrade, Serbia |
| 2023 | Classic | (Poland) Bartosz Szczesny | (Slovenia) Robert Cernigoj | (Czech Republic) Jakub Marx | Corinth, Greece |
| 2023 | Open | (Czech Republic) Robin Šebo | (Poland) Marcin Tausiewicz | (Czech Republic) Miroslav Havlíček | Corinth, Greece |
| 2023 | Production | (France) Eric Grauffel | (Czech Republic) Michal Štěpán | (Spain) Eduardo De Cobos Abreu | Corinth, Greece |
| 2023 | Production Optics | (Czech Republic) Martin Kameníček | (France) Emile Obriot | (Netherlands) Dylan Keppel | Corinth, Greece |
| 2023 | Revolver | (Austria) Gerald Reiter | (Germany) Sascha Back | (Austria) Robert Kroiss | Corinth, Greece |
| 2023 | Standard | (Italy) Giacomo Bolzoni | (Czech Republic) Josef Rakušan | (Austria) Daniele Antoniotti | Corinth, Greece |

=== Lady category ===
| Year | Division | Gold | Silver | Bronze | Venue |
|---|---|---|---|---|---|
| 1995 | Open | (Austria) Gabriele Glaser | (Spain) Pilar Guijarro Benito | (United Kingdom) Elaine Berwick | Gotland, Sweden |
| 1998 | Open | (Austria) Gabriele Glaser | (Spain) Maria Pilar Guijarro Beni | (Austria) Margit Steurer | Crete, Greece |
| 1998 | Standard | (Germany) Petra Tutschke | (Italy) Emanuela Tonello | (Italy) Teresa Buontempo | Crete, Greece |
| 2001 | Open | (Austria) Gabriele Kraushofer | (Austria) Margit Steurer | (Austria) Anita Klien | Philippsburg, Germany |
| 2001 | Standard | Marina Kryuchin | (Italy) Roberta Gardelli | Denise Salath | Philippsburg, Germany |
| 2004 | Open | (Austria) Gabriele Kraushofer | (Austria) Anita Klien | (Austria) Margit Steurer | Tábor Oparany, Czech Republic |
| 2004 | Standard | (Germany) Petra Tutschke | (Czech Republic) Marketa Zarubova | (Czech Republic) Michaela Horejsi | Tábor Oparany, Czech Republic |
| 2007 | Open | (Austria) Gabriele Kraushofer | (Czech Republic) Lenka Horejsi | (Austria) Margit Steurer | Cheval Blanc, France |
| 2007 | Standard | (Germany) Petra Tutschke | (Czech Republic) Michaela Horejsi | (Spain) Concepcion Perez Gil | Cheval Blanc, France |
| 2007 | Production | (Italy) Patrizia Giannella | (Norway) Elisabeth Wiel | (Italy) Valentina Poggiali | Cheval Blanc, France |
| 2010 | Open | (Austria) Gabriele Kraushofer | (Spain) Lorena Ballesteros | (Czech Republic) Lenka Horejsi | Belgrade, Serbia |
| 2010 | Standard | (Germany) Petra Tutschke | (Norway) Hilde Nakling | (Czech Republic) Helena Dlouha | Belgrade, Serbia |
| 2010 | Production | (France) Leatitia Daguenel | (Russia) Mira Barinova | (Russia) Maria Guschina | Belgrade, Serbia |
| 2013 | Open | (Spain) Lorena Ballesteros Fernandez | (Spain) Rakel Malanda Ruiz | (Austria) Margit Steurer | Barcelos, Portugal |
| 2013 | Standard | (Germany) Petra Tutschke | (Russia) Mira Barinova | (Norway) Hilde Nakling | Barcelos, Portugal |
| 2013 | Production | (Russia) Maria Gushchina | (Russia) Svetlana Nikolaeva | (Switzerland) Christine Burkhalter | Barcelos, Portugal |
| 2016 | Open | (Czech Republic) Lenka Horejsi | (Czech Republic) Martina Šerá | (Spain) Lorena Ballesteros | Felsőtárkány, Hungary |
| 2016 | Standard | (Switzerland) Christine Burkhalter | (Austria) Christa Hochholdinger | (Denmark) Norah Josephsen | Felsőtárkány, Hungary |
| 2016 | Production | (Russia) Maria Gushchina | (France) Margaux Nycz | (Italy) Ilaria Giunchiglia | Felsőtárkány, Hungary |

=== Junior category ===
| Year | Division | Gold | Silver | Bronze | Venue |
|---|---|---|---|---|---|
| 1992 | Open | (France) William Joly | | | Barcelona, Spain |
| 1998 | Open | (France) Eric Grauffel | (France) Frederic Loore | (France) Denis Pantel | Crete, Greece |
| 2001 | Open | (Czech Republic) Martin Kamenicek | (Spain) Jorge Ballesteros | (Czech Republic) Miroslav Havlíček | Philippsburg, Germany |
| 2004 | Open | (Germany) Timo Kosiol | (France) Emile Obriot | (Germany) Maxmilian Wiegand | Tábor Oparany, Czech Republic |
| 2004 | Standard | (Czech Republic) Zdenek Liehne | (Serbia and Montenegro) Nemanja Savic | (Germany) Constantin Materna | Tábor Oparany, Czech Republic |
| 2007 | Open | (France) Emile Obriot | (Germany) Maximilian Wiegand | (Czech Republic) David Blaha | Cheval Blanc, France |
| 2007 | Production | (Czech Republic) Zdenek Svehla | (France) Dorian Casarosa | (Slovakia) Andrej Hrnciarik | Cheval Blanc, France |
| 2010 | Open | (Switzerland) Jessey Heller | (Czech Republic) Martina Šerá | (Finland) Simo Partanen | Belgrade, Serbia |
| 2010 | Production | (Slovakia) Andrej Hrnciarik | (France) Mathieu Lavergne | (Slovakia) Ernest Nagy Jun. | Belgrade, Serbia |
| 2013 | Open | (Finland) Simo Partanen | (Russia) Daniil Karchev | (France) Francois Belloni | Barcelos, Portugal |
| 2013 | Standard | (Norway) Kenneth Handberg | (Greece) Sotirios-Thomas Zafeiridis | (Norway) Mats Selven | Barcelos, Portugal |
| 2013 | Production | (Russia) Pavel Torgashov | (Russia) Konstantin Kryuchin | (Russia) Nikita Kryuchin | Barcelos, Portugal |
| 2016 | Standard | (Russia) Danila Pakhomov | (Russia) Ilya Sologub | (Russia) Kirill Fedorov | Felsőtárkány, Hungary |

=== Senior category ===
| Year | Division | Gold | Silver | Bronze | Venue |
|---|---|---|---|---|---|
| 1995 | Open | (Austria) Albert Steinmueller | | | Gotland, Sweden |
| 1998 | Open | (Finland) Jorma Kotkatvuori | (Austria) Rudolf Heide | (Monaco) Marc Bouchoucha | Crete, Greece |
| 1998 | Standard | (Germany) Max Wiegand | (Germany) Horst Wittmann | (Norway) Halvor Sponberg | Crete, Greece |
| 2001 | Open | (France) Alain Tarrade | (Czech Republic) Stanislav Strizik | (France) Philippe Gibert | Philippsburg, Germany |
| 2001 | Standard | (Switzerland) Peter Kressibucher | (Germany) Horst Wittmann | (Germany) Werner Dahmen | Philippsburg, Germany |
| 2004 | Open | (Spain) Antonio Garcia | (Czech Republic) Miroslav Kamenicek | (Canada) Michael Auger | Tábor Oparany, Czech Republic |
| 2004 | Modified | (Czech Republic) Vaclav Martinek | (Italy) Giovanni Furio Liberti | (Monaco) Thierry Faure | Tábor Oparany, Czech Republic |
| 2004 | Standard | (Italy) Magli Esterino | (France) Joel Gerard | (Switzerland) Peter Kressibucher | Tábor Oparany, Czech Republic |
| 2004 | Production | (Slovakia) Svetozar Slanina | (Slovakia) Stefan Acs | (Slovenia) Boris Medja | Tábor Oparany, Czech Republic |
| 2007 | Open | (France) Thierry Obriot | (Italy) Mario Riillo | (Austria) Franz Volk | Cheval Blanc, France |
| 2007 | Modified | (Czech Republic) Vaclav Martinek | (Italy) Gavino Mura | (Italy) Giovanni Furio Liberti | Cheval Blanc, France |
| 2007 | Standard | (Italy) Esterino Magli | (Italy) Alessandro Botticelli | (Czech Republic) Petr Kubacek | Cheval Blanc, France |
| 2007 | Production | (Italy) Nicola Rutigliano | (Germany) Johannes Blazicek | (United Kingdom) Bob Dunkley | Cheval Blanc, France |
| 2007 | Revolver | (Germany) Dietmar Rauer | (Czech Republic) Lumir Safranek | (Italy) Claudio Zambonin | Cheval Blanc, France |
| 2010 | Open | (Spain) Juan Carlos Ballesteros | (Czech Republic) Miroslav Kamenicek | (Italy) Adriano Parisi | Belgrade, Serbia |
| 2010 | Modified | (Spain) Antonio Garcia | (Czech Republic) Milos Sustr | (Italy) Gavino Mura | Belgrade, Serbia |
| 2010 | Standard | (Italy) Esterino Magli | (Germany) Frank Weuster | (Austria) Gottfried Post | Belgrade, Serbia |
| 2010 | Production | (Switzerland) Peter Heller | (Italy) Francesco Servodio | (Russia) Evgeny Efimov | Belgrade, Serbia |
| 2010 | Revolver | (Austria) Hermann Kirchweger | (Czech Republic) Zdenek Nemecek | (Germany) Dietmar Rauer | Belgrade, Serbia |
| 2013 | Open | (Spain) Juan Carlos Ballesteros | (Lithuania) Rinat Bektemirov | (Italy) Giuseppe Todaro | Barcelos, Portugal |
| 2013 | Standard | (Italy) Esterino Magli | (Italy) Salvatore Simula | (Italy) Tullio Silvera | Barcelos, Portugal |
| 2013 | Production | (Sweden) Stefan Ekstedt | (Italy) Francesco Servodio | (Switzerland) Peter Heller | Barcelos, Portugal |
| 2013 | Classic | (France) Joel Gerard | (France) Michel Nestolat | (Austria) Christian Breitler | Barcelos, Portugal |
| 2013 | Revolver | (Austria) Hermann Kirchweger | (Czech Republic) Zdenek Nemecek | (Germany) Markus Schneider | Barcelos, Portugal |
| 2016 | Open | (Spain) Jose Zanon Blasco | (Sweden) Johan Hansen | (Italy) Paolo Ravizzini | Felsőtárkány, Hungary |
| 2016 | Standard | (Italy) Adriano Santarcangelo | (Austria) Gottfried Post | (Italy) Paolo Paoletti | Felsőtárkány, Hungary |
| 2016 | Production | (Sweden) Stefan Ekstedt | (Italy) Giovanni Zuccolo | (Portugal) Manuel Silva | Felsőtárkány, Hungary |
| 2016 | Classic | (Italy) Edoardo Buticchi | (Italy) Guido Ciccarelli | (France) Michel Nestolat | Felsőtárkány, Hungary |
| 2016 | Revolver | (Sweden) Olof Lindskog | (Germany) Markus Schneider | (Czech Republic) Tibor Ladic | Felsőtárkány, Hungary |

=== Super Senior category ===
| Year | Division | Gold | Silver | Bronze | Venue |
|---|---|---|---|---|---|
| 2001 | Open | (Austria) Albert Steinmueller | Pertti Hillebrand | (Austria) Helmut Ilc | Philippsburg, Germany |
| 2004 | Open | (Czech Republic) Ludmila Strizikova | (Norway) Halvor Sponberg | (Denmark) K.B. Svendsen | Tábor Oparany, Czech Republic |
| 2004 | Standard | (Germany) Max Wiegand | (Belgium) Raymond Platéus | (Austria) Dieter Laiss | Tábor Oparany, Czech Republic |
| 2007 | Open | (France) Alain Tarrade | (Austria) Anton Fuchs | (Austria) Wolfgang Kugler | Cheval Blanc, France |
| 2007 | Standard | (Germany) Max Wiegand | (Germany) Horst Wittmann | (Belgium) Raymond Platéus | Cheval Blanc, France |
| 2007 | Production | (Spain) Kehir Holo Rawas | (Spain) Teodoro Rios Marrero | (Serbia) Marko Jovanovic | Cheval Blanc, France |
| 2010 | Open | (France) Philippe Gibert | (France) Alain Tarrade | (Sweden) Rolf Lönn | Belgrade, Serbia |
| 2010 | Standard | (Switzerland) Peter Kressibucher | (Germany) Max Wiegand | (Spain) Enrique Fernandez | Belgrade, Serbia |
| 2010 | Production | (Belgium) Raymond Platéus | (Czech Republic) Zdenek Rataj | (France) Andre Tasset | Belgrade, Serbia |
| 2013 | Open | (France) Philippe Gibert | (Spain) Antonio Garcia Infantes | (Italy) Furio Liberti | Barcelos, Portugal |
| 2013 | Standard | (Switzerland) Peter Kressibucher | (Finland) Markku Koistinen | (Austria) Ronald Riedel | Barcelos, Portugal |
| 2013 | Production | (Czech Republic) Miroslav Kamenicek | (United Kingdom) Bob Dunkley | (Belgium) Raymond Platéus | Barcelos, Portugal |
| 2016 | Open | (Italy) Ivano Bencivenni | (Italy) Gavino Mura | (Czech Republic) Miroslav Kamenicek | Felsőtárkány, Hungary |
| 2016 | Standard | (Italy) Esterino Magli | (Italy) Alessandro Botticelli | (Switzerland) Peter Kressibucher | Felsőtárkány, Hungary |
| 2016 | Production | (Germany) Heribert Bettermann | (Germany) Max Wiegand | (Finland) Hannu Maunula | Felsőtárkány, Hungary |

== Teams ==
=== Overall teams ===
| Year | Division | Gold | Silver | Bronze | Venue |
|---|---|---|---|---|---|
| 2001 | Standard | Italy | Sweden 1539,3310; Lars-Tony Skoog, Robert Söderström, Dan Liljeström, Peter Sandgren | Spain | Philippsburg, Germany |

== See also ==
- IPSC European Rifle Championship
- IPSC European Shotgun Championship
