= Vöröskő-spring =

Fresh water spring in Hungary

Coordinates: 48.046720898312095°N 20.44416005249945°E

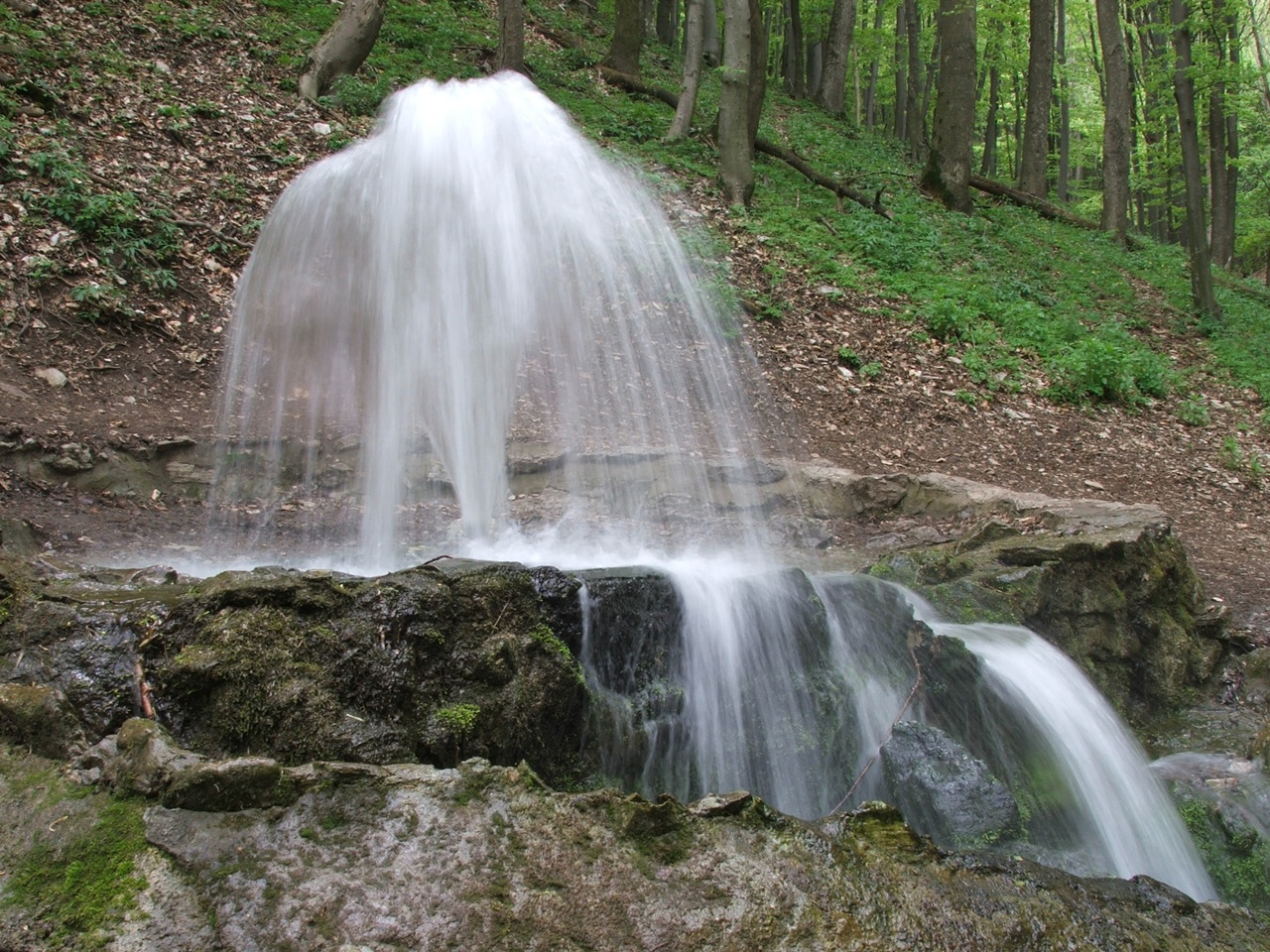
The spring

Vöröskő-spring is a fresh water spring in the Bükk Mountains in Hungary, not far from Felsőtárkány. The name "Vöröskő" means "red stone" in Hungarian. The spring works periodically, usually for 3–4 months after melting period. It is part of the Bükk National Park.

== Approach ==
The Vöröskő-Spring is located in the western part of the Bükk Mountains, to the north from Felsőtárkány village. It is approachable from Felsőtárkány by the Felsőtárkány National Forest Railway. From the final stop of the railway, the spring is approachable on foot in the most comfortable way. Cyclists can also approach it following the railroad. The place of the spring is easily recognisable; because of the high water pressure, the water is coming out to the surface in a big concreted area.

== About the spring ==
Under the southern fringe of the limestone-plateau of the Bükk Mountain, in 450-500m height above sea level, four periodical karst springs have their source. The best-known of them is the Vöröskő-spring. The precipitation falling on the limestone-plateau of the Bükk Mountain leaks into the rock. As a result, the amount of the karstwater increases and rises as springs.
