= IPSC European Shotgun Championship =

The IPSC European Shotgun Championship is an IPSC level 4 championship hosted every third year in Europe.

== History ==
- 1987 October 8-11, Great Britain
- 2003 August 27-30, Terni, Italy
- 2006 September 6-9, Kavala, Greece
- 2009 September 15-18, Oparany, Czech Republic

The first IPSC European Shotgun Championship was held in October 1987 at the National Shooting Centre in Bisley, England, a couple of days before the seventh IPSC European Handgun Championship at the same shooting range.

== Champions ==
The following is a list of current and past IPSC European Shotgun Champions.

=== Overall category ===
Year	Division	Gold	Silver	Bronze	Venue
1987					Great Britain
2003	Open	(Italy) Mario Riillo	(Italy) Edoardo Roberto Buticchi	(Italy) Giovanni Furio Liberti	Terni, Italy
2003	Modified	(Italy) Germano Taratufolo	(Italy) Fabrizio Fornaballi	(Russia) Vitaly Kryuchin	Terni, Italy
2003	Standard	(Italy) Roberto Ferruccio Vezzoli	(Finland) Raine Peltokoski	(Finland) Petri Runtti	Terni, Italy
2003	Standard Manual	(Italy) Luigi Silvestroni	(Italy) Paolo Brocanelli	(Italy) Giovanni Di Giulio	Terni, Italy
2006	Open	(Czech Republic) Vaclav Vinduska	(Germany) Dirk Frey	(Russia) Ivan Koshkin	Kavala, Greece
2006	Modified	(Russia) Vitaly Kryuchin	(Russia) Ramazan Mubarakov	(Italy) Davide Cerrato	Kavala, Greece
2006	Standard	(Finland) Raine Peltokoski	(Slovenia) Andrej Fegus	(Italy) Roberto Ferrucc Vezzoli	Kavala, Greece
2006	Standard Manual	(Italy) Luigi Silvestroni	(Italy) Giovanni Di Giulio	(Italy) Paolo Zambai	Kavala, Greece
2009	Open	(Czech Republic) Vaclav Vinduska	(Slovakia) Jan Pavlik	(Germany) Dirk Frey	Oparany, Czech Republic
2009	Modified	(Serbia) Igor Jankovic	(Serbia) Goran Jankovic	(Hungary) Geza Puskas	Oparany, Czech Republic
2009	Standard	(Finland) Petri Runtti	(Italy) Roberto Vezzoli	(Finland) Raine Peltokoski	Oparany, Czech Republic
2009	Standard Manual	(Italy) Luigi Silvestroni	(Italy) Paolo Zambai	(Italy) Giovanni Di Giulio	Oparany, Czech Republic

=== Lady category ===
Year	Division	Gold	Silver	Bronze	Venue
2003	Modified	(United Kingdom) Vanessa Duffy			Terni, Italy
2003	Standard Manual	(Italy) Irene Canetta	(Italy) Roberta Berti	(Italy) Alessandra Costa	Terni, Italy
2006	Standard	(United Kingdom) Vanessa Duffy	(United Kingdom) Helen Kenneth	(Russia) Svetlana Molchanova	Kavala, Greece
2009	Standard	(United Kingdom) Vanessa Duffy	(Germany) Sandra Schuh	(United Kingdom) Josie Adam	Oparany, Czech Republic

=== Junior category ===
Year	Division	Gold	Silver	Bronze	Venue
2006	Standard	(Russia) Vasily Plaksin	(Czech Republic) Zdenek Svehla Jnr.	(United Kingdom) Michael Harvey	Kavala, Greece

=== Senior category ===
Year	Division	Gold	Silver	Bronze	Venue
2003	Open	(Italy) Giovanni Furio Liberti	(Italy) Lauro Rossi	(United Kingdom) David John Clegg	Terni, Italy
2003	Standard Manual	(Italy) Domenico Cadeddu	(Czech Republic) Miroslav Marek	(Italy) Andrea Lancioni	Terni, Italy
2006	Open	(Italy) Giovanni Furio Liberti	(Italy) Mario Riillo	(Greece) Georgios Soulis	Kavala, Greece
2006	Modified	(Italy) Germano Taratufolo	(United Kingdom) Andrew Newman	(Germany) Bernd Wiessner	Kavala, Greece
2006	Standard	(Czech Republic) Vaclav Martinek	(Italy) Gavino Mura	(United Kingdom) Barry Sullivan	Kavala, Greece
2006	Standard Manual	(Czech Republic) Miroslav Marek	(Czech Republic) Lumir Safranek	(United Kingdom) Graham Hill	Kavala, Greece
2009	Open	(Italy) Mario Riillo	(Czech Republic) Miroslav Marek	(Czech Republic) Julius Skoda	Oparany, Czech Republic
2009	Standard	(Italy) Amedeo Sessa	(Germany) Bernd Wiessner	(United Kingdom) Barry Sullivan	Oparany, Czech Republic
2009	Standard Manual	(Czech Republic) Tibor Ladic	(Poland) Boguslaw Gaweda	(Slovenia) Franc Prusnik	Oparany, Czech Republic

=== Super Senior category ===
Year	Division	Gold	Silver	Bronze	Venue
2009	Open	(Hungary) Pal Csefko	(Germany) Hubert Kroll	(Germany) Rolf Valpertz	Oparany, Czech Republic

== See also ==
- IPSC European Handgun Championship
- IPSC European Rifle Championship
