= Bob Dunkley =

Robert Edward Dunkley
Medal record
IPSC
Representing United Kingdom
IPSC Handgun World Shoots
Silver medal – second place	2011 Rhodes	Production Super Senior
Silver medal – second place	2014 Frostproof	Classic Super Senior
IPSC European Handgun Championship
Gold medal – first place	1981 Uppsala
Gold medal – first place	1982 Warminster
Gold medal – first place	1984 Paris

Robert "Bob" Dunkley is a British competitive shooter who has won IPSC European Handgun Championship three times (1981, 1982 and 1984), and the IPSC British Handgun Championship 16 times. He currently works in his own firearm shop which he has had since 1984.
