= Gabriele Kraushofer =

Austrian sport shooter

Medal record
IPSC
Representing Austria
IPSC Handgun World Shoot
Gold medal – first place	2005 Guayaquil	Open Lady
IPSC European Handgun Championship
Gold medal – first place	1995 Gotland	Open Lady
Gold medal – first place	1998 Crete	Open Lady
Gold medal – first place	2001 Philippsburg	Open Lady
Gold medal – first place	2004 Tábor	Open Lady
Gold medal – first place	2007 Cheval Blanc	Open Lady
Gold medal – first place	2010 Belgrade	Open Lady
IPSC Austrian Handgun Championship
Gold medal – first place	1992	Lady
Gold medal – first place	1993	Lady Open
Gold medal – first place	1994	Lady Open
Gold medal – first place	1995	Lady Open
Gold medal – first place	1995	Lady Standard
Gold medal – first place	1996	Lady Open
Gold medal – first place	1996	Lady Standard
Gold medal – first place	1997	Lady Open
Gold medal – first place	1997	Lady Standard
Gold medal – first place	1998	Lady Open
Gold medal – first place	1998	Lady Standard
Gold medal – first place	1999	Lady Standard
Gold medal – first place	2000	Lady Open
Gold medal – first place	2000	Lady Standard
Gold medal – first place	2001	Lady Open
Gold medal – first place	2003	Lady Open
Gold medal – first place	2004	Lady Open
Gold medal – first place	2005	Lady Open
Gold medal – first place	2007	Lady Open
Gold medal – first place	2009	Lady Open
Gold medal – first place	2010	Lady Open
Gold medal – first place	2011	Lady Open
Gold medal – first place	2012	Lady Open

Gabriele Kraushofer (born Gabriele Glaser) is an Austrian sport shooter who won the 2005 IPSC Handgun World Shoot in the Open division Lady category. She has also won the IPSC European Handgun Championship in the Open division Lady category six times (1995, 1998, 2001, 2004, 2007 and 2010). She is also 23 times Austrian handgun champion in the Lady division.
