= IPSC Austrian Handgun Championship =

Sport shooting competition in Austria

The IPSC Austrian National Handgun Championship is an IPSC level 3 championship held once a year by the Austrian Association for Practical Shooting.

== Champions ==
The following is a list of previous and current champions.

=== Overall Category ===
Year	Division	Gold	Silver	Bronze	Venue
1990	Open	(Austria) Peter Paul Ploner	(Austria)	(Austria)	
1991	Open	(Austria) Hans Silbitzer	(Austria)	(Austria)	
1992	Open	(Austria) Peter Paul Ploner	(Austria) Walter Pöchhacker	(Austria) Andreas Stettin	SGW Leobersdorf
1993	Open	(Austria) Peter Paul Ploner	(Austria)	(Austria)	
1994	Open	(Austria) Roland Kraushofer	(Austria) Norbert Mühlbacher	(Austria) Günter Weber	
1994	Standard	(Austria) Josef Hippesroither	(Austria) Franz Michael Pratschner	(Austria) Leopold Kuntner	
1995	Open	(Austria) Julius Zsinka	(Austria)	(Austria)	
1995	Standard	(Austria) Peter Bauer	(Austria) Friedrich Ziebart	(Austria) Thomas Birner	
1996	Open	(Austria) Peter Paul Ploner	(Austria)	(Austria)	
1996	Standard	(Austria) Peter Bauer	(Austria) Andreas Stettin	(Austria) Rudolf Waldinger	
1997	Open	(Austria) Andreas Schwab	(Austria) Franz Volk	(Austria)	SGW Leobersdorf
1997	Standard	(Austria) Peter Bauer	(Austria) Thomas Hinterberger	(Austria) Franz Volk	SGW Leobersdorf
1998	Open	(Austria) Gerhard Heimburger	(Austria)	(Austria)	
1998	Standard	(Austria) Friedrich Ziebart	(Austria)	(Austria)	
1999	Open	(Austria) Günter Weber	(Austria)	(Austria)	
1999	Standard	(Austria) Heinrich Maier	(Austria)	(Austria)	
2000	Open	(Austria) Günter Weber	(Austria)	(Austria)	
2000	Standard	(Austria) Andreas Stettin	(Austria)	(Austria)	
2001	Open	(Austria) Günter Weber	(Austria)	(Austria)	
2001	Standard	(Austria) Gernot Sieber	(Austria) Heinrich Maier	(Austria) Remo Kaufmann	
2002	Open	(Austria) Günter Weber	(Austria)	(Austria)	
2002	Standard	(Austria) Hermann Kirchweger	(Austria)	(Austria)	
2003	Open	(Austria) Franz Volk	(Austria)	(Austria)	
2003	Standard	(Austria) Robert Pichler	(Austria)	(Austria)	
2004	Open	(Austria) Andreas Stettin	(Austria) Günter Weber	(Austria) Alexander Volk	
2004	Standard	(Austria) Hermann Kirchweger	(Austria) Franz Volk	(Austria) Stefan Habisch	
2004	Revolver	(Austria) Hermann Kirchweger	(Austria) Martin Kronberger	(Austria) Roman Willhalm	
2005	Open	(Austria) Alexander Volk	(Austria)	(Austria)	
2005	Standard	(Austria) Klaus Mayerhofer	(Austria)	(Austria)	
2006	Open	(Austria) Günter Weber	(Austria) Gerald Starke	(Austria) Harald Schallerbauer	
2006	Standard	(Austria) Andreas Stettin	(Austria) Gottfried Post	(Austria) Mario Kneringer	
2006	Revolver	(Austria) Hermann Kirchweger	(Austria) Martin Kronberger	(Austria) Richard Schraubmair	
2007	Open	(Austria) Alexander Volk	(Austria) Günter Weber	(Austria) Andreas Stettin	PSSV Graz
2007	Standard	(Austria) Klaus Mayerhofer	(Austria) Johann Baminger	(Austria) Hermann Kirchweger	PSSV Graz
2007	Revolver	(Austria) Martin Kronberger	(Austria) Kurt Partinger	(Austria) Schaubmair Richard	PSSV Graz
2008	Open	(Austria) Mario Kneringer	(Austria) Günter Weber	(Austria) Alexander Volk	PSV Linz
2008	Standard	(Austria) Johann Baminger	(Austria) Jürgen Stranz	(Austria) Klaus Hörmannseder	PSV Linz
2008	Revolver	(Austria) Hermann Kirchweger	(Austria) Martin Kronberger	(Austria) Gernot Siber	PSV Linz
2009	Open	(Austria) Mario Kneringer	(Austria) Stefan Zeindl	(Austria) Günter Weber	SCW Wien
2009	Production	(Austria) Dominik Stepan	(Austria) Walter Fellner	(Austria) Gerald Reiter	SCW Wien
2009	Standard	(Austria) Jürgen Stranz	(Austria) Johann Baminger	(Austria) Klaus Hörmannseder	SCW Wien
2009	Revolver	(Austria) Hermann Kirchweger	(Austria) Martin Kronberger	(Austria) Christian Breiler	SCW Wien
2010	Open	(Austria) Mario Kneringer	(Austria) Alexander Volk	(Austria) Franz Volk	PSV Linz-Steyregg
2010	Production	(Austria) Gerald Reiter	(Austria) Gottfried Post	(Austria) Martin Kronberger	PSV Linz-Steyregg
2010	Standard	(Austria) Gottfried Post	(Austria) Klaus Hörmanseder	(Austria) Jürgen Stranz	PSSV Graz
2010	Revolver	(Austria) Hermann Kirchweger	(Austria) Martin Kronberger	(Austria) Richard Schaubmair	PSSV Graz
2011	Open	(Austria) Mario Kneringer	(Austria) Günter Weber	(Austria) Gabriele Kraushofer	SCW Wien
2011	Produktion	(Austria) Gerald Reiter	(Austria) Gottfried Post	(Austria) Bosko Rasovic	SCW Wien
2011	Standard	(Austria) Jürgen Stranz	(Austria) Hermann Kirchweger	(Austria) Gerald Reiter	PSV Linz-Steyregg
2011	Revolver	(Austria) Hermann Kirchweger	(Austria) Martin Kronberger	(Austria) Gerald Reiter	PSV Linz-Steyregg
2012	Open	(Austria) Alexander Volk	(Austria) Günter Weber	(Austria) Mario Kneringer	PSSV Graz
2012	Production	(Austria) Andreas Oriol	(Austria) Gottfried Post	(Austria) Gernot Siber	PSSV Graz
2012	Standard	(Austria) Gerald Reiter	(Austria) Jürgen Stranz	(Austria) Klaus Hörmanseder	PSSV Graz
2012	Revolver	(Austria) Gerald Reiter	(Austria) Hermann Kirchweger	(Austria) Martin Kronsberger	PSSV Graz
2013	Open	(Austria) Alexander Volk	(Austria) Mario Kneringer	(Austria) Stefan Zeindl	SCW Wien
2013	Production	(Austria) Bosko Rasovic	(Austria) Reinhard Handl	(Austria) Gerald Reiter	SCW Wien
2013	Standard	(Austria) Jürgen Stranz	(Austria) Gerald Reiter	(Austria) Hermann Kirchweger	PSSV Graz
2013	Revolver	(Austria) Reiter Gerald	(Austria) Hermann Kirchweger	(Austria) Martin Kronberger	PSSV Graz
2013	Classic	(Austria) Dietmar Rauscher	(Austria) Mario Kneringer	(Austria) Christian Breitler	SCW Wien
2014	Open	(Austria) Mario Kneringer	(Austria) Alexander Volk	(Austria) Günter Weber	SCW Wien
2014	Production	(Austria) Bosko Rasovic	(Austria) Mario Kneringer	(Austria) Andreas Oriol	SCW Wien
2014	Standard	(Austria) Reinhard Handl	(Austria) Jürgen Stranz	(Austria) Mario Kneringer	PSSV Graz
2014	Revolver	(Austria) Gerald Reiter	(Austria) Martin Kronberger	(Austria) Robert Kroiss	PSSV Graz
2014	Classic	(Austria) Maximilian Huber	(Austria) Gerald Stacherl	(Austria) Reinhard Handl	SCW Wien
2015	Open	(Austria) Alexander Volk	(Austria) Mario Kneringer	(Austria) Günter Weber	
2015	Production	(Austria) Gerald Reiter	(Austria) Bosko Rasovic	(Austria) Gerald Stacherl	
2015	Classic	(Austria) Gerald Stacherl	(Austria) Mario Kneringer	(Austria) Christian Breitler	
2016	Open	(Austria) Rudolf Wilhalm jun.	(Austria) Alexander Volk	(Austria) Mario Kneringer	PSSV Graz
2016	Standard	(Austria) Jürgen Stranz	(Austria) Gottfried Post	(Austria) Gerald Reiter	PSSV Graz
2016	Production	(Austria) Andreas Oriol	(Austria) Gerald Reiter	(Austria) Mario Kneringer	PSSV Graz
2016	Revolver	(Austria) Gerald Reiter	(Austria) Reinhard Handl	(Austria) Robert Kroiss	PSSV Graz
2016	Classic	(Austria) Gerald Reiter	(Austria) Reinhard Handl	(Austria) Bosko Rasovic	PSSV Graz
2017	Open	(Austria) Mario Kneringer	(Austria) Manuel Schnaitt	(Austria) Alexander Volk	PSSV Graz
2017	Standard	(Austria) Reinhard Handl	(Austria) Hans Georg Koller	(Austria) Gerald Reiter	SSV Vöcklabruck
2017	Production	(Austria) Gerald Reiter	(Austria) Bosko Rasovic	(Austria) Simon Heiligenbrunner	PSSV Graz
2017	Revolver	(Austria) Gerald Reiter	(Austria) Robert Kroiss	(Austria) Hermann Kirchweger	SSV Vöcklabruck
2017	Classic	(Austria) Gerald Reiter	(Austria) Maximilian Huber	(Austria) Bosko Rasovic	PSSV Graz
2018	Open	(Austria) Alexander Volk	(Austria) Reiter Gerald	(Austria) Mario Kneringer	PSSV Graz
2018	Standard	(Austria) Reinhard Handl	(Austria) Jürgen Stranz	(Austria) Gerald Reiter	SSV Vöcklabruck
2018	Production	(Austria) Benjamin Thallinger	(Austria) Andreas Oriol	(Austria) Reinhard Handl	PSSV Graz
2018	Production Optic	(Austria) Schnaitt Manuel	(Austria) Bosko Rasovic	(Austria) Maximilian Huber	SSV Vöcklabruck
2018	Revolver	(Austria) Gerald Reiter	(Austria) Johann Lang	(Austria) Robert Kroiss	SSV Vöcklabruck
2018	Classic	(Austria) Gerald Reiter	(Austria) Reinhard Handl	(Austria) Dietmar Rauscher	PSSV Graz
2019	Open	(Austria) Mario Kneringer	(Austria) Alexander Volk	(Austria) Christoph Kecht	SCW Wien
2019	Standard	(Austria) Jürgen Stranz	(Austria) Reinhard Handl	(Austria) Simon Heiligenbrunner	SSV Vöcklabruck
2019	Production	(Austria) Benjamin Thallinger	(Austria) Andreas Oriol	(Austria) Bosko Rasovic	SCW Wien
2019	Production Optic	(Austria) Gerald Reiter	(Austria) Martin Meißner	(Austria) Manuel Schnaitt	SSV Vöcklabruck
2019	Revolver	(Austria) Gerald Reiter	(Austria) Johann Lang	(Austria) Hermann Kirchweger	SCW Wien
2019	Classic	(Austria) Alexander Kastner	(Austria) Markus Ebner	(Austria) Michael Lindenbauer	SSV Vöcklabruck
2019	PCC	(Austria) Martin Theilinger	(Austria) Martin Thaler	(Austria) Mario Kneringer	SGW Leobersdorf
2020	Open	(Austria) Mario Kneringer	(Austria) Gerald Reiter	(Austria) Stefan Zeindl	SCW Wien
2020	Standard	(Austria) Hans Georg Koller	(Austria) Simon Heiligenbrunner	(Austria) Benjamin Thallinger	SCW Wien
2020	Production Optic	(Austria) Martin Thaler	(Austria) Martin Meissner	(Austria) Rainer Ulreich	SCW Wien
2021	Open	(Austria) Gerald Reiter	(Austria) Manuel Schnaitt	(Austria) Alexander Volk	SCW Wien
2021	Standard	(Austria) Reinhard Handl	(Austria) Jürgen Stranz	(Austria) Maximilian Huber	SCW Wien
2021	Production Optic	(Austria) Rainer Ullreich	(Austria) Martin Meissner	(Austria) Martin Thaler	SCW Wien
2021	PCC	(Austria) Martin Thaler	(Austria) Martin Theilinger	(Austria) Mario Kneringer	SSV Vöcklabruck
2022	Standard	(Austria) Jürgen Stranz	(Austria) Reinhard Handl	(Austria) Rainer Ulreich	SGW Leobersdorf
2022	Classic	(Austria) Alexander Kastner	(Austria) Otmar Lorenz	(Austria) Christoph Fischer	SGW Leobersdorf
2022	Revolver	(Austria) Robert Kroiss	(Austria) Nikolaus Stelzmüller	(Austria) Andreas Gruber	SGW Leobersdorf
2023	Mini Rifle	(Austria) Martin Theilinger	(Austria) Günter Stacher	(Austria) Martin Thaler	SCW Wien
2023	Production	(Austria) Simon Heiligenbrunner	(Austria) Rainer Ulreich	(Austria) Daniel Holub	SSV Vöcklabruck
2023	Classic	(Austria) Alexander Kastner	(Austria) Hans Georg Koller	(Austria) Markus Ebner	SSV Vöcklabruck
2023	Revolver	(Austria) Gerald Reiter	(Austria) Robert Kroiss	(Austria) Nikolaus Stelzmüller	SSV Vöcklabruck

=== Lady Category ===
Year	Division	Gold	Silver	Bronze	Venue
1990	Open	(Austria) Emma Zemann	(Austria)	(Austria)	
1991	Open	(Austria) Patrizia Oesterreicher	(Austria)	(Austria)	
1992	Open	(Austria) Gabriele Glaser	(Austria)	(Austria)	
1993	Open	(Austria) Gabriele Glaser	(Austria)	(Austria)	
1994	Open	(Austria) Gabriele Glaser	(Austria) Andrea Dvorak	(Austria) Marlies Hofer	
1995	Open	(Austria) Gabriele Glaser	(Austria)	(Austria)	
1995	Standard	(Austria) Gabriele Glaser	(Austria) Margit Steurer	(Austria) Andrea Dvorak	
1996	Open	(Austria) Gabriele Glaser	(Austria)	(Austria)	
1996	Standard	(Austria) Gabriele Glaser	(Austria) Andrea Dvorak	(Austria) Nicole Mostögl	
1997	Open	(Austria) Gabriele Glaser	(Austria)	(Austria)	SGW Leobersdorf
1997	Standard	(Austria) Gabriele Glaser	(Austria) Margit Steurer	(Austria) Notburga Hasenkopf	SGW Leobersdorf
1998	Open	(Austria) Gabriele Glaser	(Austria)	(Austria)	
1998	Standard	(Austria) Gabriele Glaser	(Austria)	(Austria)	
1999	Open	(Austria) Anita Klien	(Austria)	(Austria)	
1999	Standard	(Austria) Gabriele Kraushofer	(Austria)	(Austria)	
2000	Open	(Austria) Gabriele Kraushofer	(Austria)	(Austria)	
2000	Standard	(Austria) Gabriele Kraushofer	(Austria)	(Austria)	
2001	Open	(Austria) Gabriele Kraushofer	(Austria)	(Austria)	
2002	Open	(Austria) Notburga Hasenkopf	(Austria)	(Austria)	
2003	Open	(Austria) Gabriele Kraushofer	(Austria)	(Austria)	
2004	Open	(Austria) Gabriele Kraushofer	(Austria) Margit Steurer	(Austria) Nicole Laschitz	
2004	Standard	(Austria) Elisabeth Strasser	(Austria) Karoline Stumptner	(Austria) Edeltraud Aigner	
2005	Open	(Austria) Gabriele Kraushofer	(Austria)	(Austria)	
2005	Standard	(Austria) Elisabeth Strasser	(Austria)	(Austria)	
2006	Open	(Austria) Margit Steurer	(Austria) Nicole Laschitz	(Austria) Notburga Hasenkopf	
2006	Standard	(Austria) Elisabeth Strasser	(Austria) Renate Gaggl	(Austria) Birgit Gruber	
2007	Open	(Austria) Gabriele Kraushofer	(Austria) Margit Steurer	(Austria) Notburga Hasenkopf	PSSV Graz
2007	Standard	(Austria) Elisabeth Strasser	(Austria) Birgit Gruber	(Austria) Petra Westerdorf	PSSV Graz
2008	Open	(Austria) Margit Steurer	(Austria) Notburga Hasenkopf	(Austria) Elin Thaler	PSV Linz
2008	Standard	(Austria) Birgit Gruber	(Austria) Elisabeth Strasser	(Austria) Edeltraut Aigner	PSV Linz
2009	Open	(Austria) Gabriele Kraushofer	(Austria) Margit Steurer	(Austria) Notburga Hasenkopf	SCW Wien
2009	Production	(Austria) Heidrun Lung	(Austria)	(Austria)	SCW Wien
2009	Standard	(Austria) Birgit Gruber	(Austria) Elisabeth Strasser	(Austria) Sonja Juen	SCW Wien
2010	Open	(Austria) Gabriele Kraushofer	(Austria) Margit Steurer	(Austria) Notburga Hasenkopf	PSV Linz-Steyregg
2010	Production	(Austria) Elisabeth Strasser	(Austria) Sonja Juen	(Austria) Edeltraut Aigner	PSV Linz-Steyregg
2010	Standard	(Austria) Elisabeth Strasser	(Austria) Gabriele Kraushofer	(Austria) Margit Steurer	PSSV Graz
2011	Open	(Austria) Gabriele Kraushofer	(Austria) Notburga Hasenkopf	(Austria) Margit Steurer	SCW Wien
2011	Production	(Austria) Elisabeth Strasser	(Austria) Edeltraud Aigner	(Austria) Cornelia Pölzl	SCW Wien
2011	Standard	(Austria) Birgit Gruber	(Austria) Gabriele Kraushofer	(Austria) Elisabeth Strasser	PSV Linz-Steyregg
2012	Open	(Austria) Gabriele Kraushofer	(Austria) Margit Steurer	(Austria) Notburga Hasenkopf	PSSV Graz
2012	Production	(Austria) Christa Hochholdinger	(Austria) Elisabeth Strasser	(Austria) Edeltraud Aigner	PSSV Graz
2012	Standard	(Austria) Elisabeth Strasser	(Austria) Birgit Gruber	(Austria) Doris Nestl	PSSV Graz
2013	Open	(Austria) Notburga Hasenkopf	(Austria) Gabriele Kraushofer	(Austria) Margit Steurer	SCW Wien
2013	Production	(Austria) Christa Hochholdinger	(Austria) Elisabeth Strasser	(Austria) Christina Stöckl	SCW Wien
2013	Standard	(Austria) Birgit Gruber	(Austria) Christa Hochholdinger	(Austria) Doris Nestl-Treiber	PSSV Graz
2014	Open	(Austria) Margit Steurer	(Austria) Gabriele Kraushofer	(Austria) Notburga Hasenkopf	SCW Wien
2014	Production	(Austria) Christa Hochholdinger	(Austria) Elisabeth Strasser	(Austria) Karin Peer	SCW Wien
2014	Standard	(Austria) Elisabeth Strasser	(Austria) Christa Hochholdinger	(Austria) Doris Nestl-Treiber	PSSV Graz
2015	Open	(Austria) Notburga Hasenkopf	(Austria) Margit Steurer	(Austria) Edeltraud Aigner	
2015	Production	(Austria) Christa Hochholdinger	(Austria) Doris Reiter	(Austria) Tamara Döllerer	
2016	Open	(Austria) Notburga Hasenkopf	(Austria) Edeltraut Aigner	(Austria) Andrea Dvorak	PSSV Graz
2016	Standard	(Austria) Christa Hochholdinger	(Austria) Doris Reiter	(Austria) Susi Weiss	PSSV Graz
2016	Production	(Austria) Christa Hochholdinger	(Austria) Doris Reiter	(Austria) Tamara Döllerer	PSSV Graz
2016	Revolver	(Austria) Desiree Schnaitt	(Austria)	(Austria)	PSSV Graz
2017	Open	(Austria) Gabriele Kraushofer	(Austria) Notburga Hasenkopf	(Austria) Margit Steurer	PSSV Graz
2017	Standard	(Austria) Christa Hochholdinger	(Austria) Gerlinde Bittermann	(Austria) Edeltraud Aigner	SSV Vöcklabruck
2017	Production	(Austria) Christa Hochholdinger	(Austria) Elisabeth Strasser	(Austria) Gerlinde Bittermann	PSSV Graz
2017	Revolver	(Austria) Doris Reiter	(Austria) Desiree Schnaitt	(Austria) Sigrid Felder	SSV Vöcklabruck
2018	Open	(Austria) Gabriele Kraushofer	(Austria) Margit Steurer	(Austria) Edeltraud Aigner	PSSV Graz
2018	Standard	(Austria) Gerlinde Bittermann	(Austria) Edeltraud Aigner	(Austria) Doris Reiter	SSV Vöcklabruck
2018	Production	(Austria) Gerlinde Bittermann	(Austria) Doris Reiter	(Austria) Brigitte Scholz	PSSV Graz
2018	Production Optic	(Austria) Edeltraud Aigner	(Austria)	(Austria)	SSV Vöcklabruck
2018	Revolver	(Austria) Doris Reiter	(Austria)	(Austria)	SSV Vöcklabruck
2019	Open	(Austria) Edeltraud Aigner	(Austria) Notburga Hasenkopf	(Austria) Doris Nestl-Treiber	SCW Wien
2019	Standard	(Austria) Birgit Gruber	(Austria) Nadiia Rekun	(Austria) Bettina Wildmann	SSV Vöcklabruck
2019	Production	(Austria) Gerlinde Bittermann	(Austria) Elisabeth Strasser	(Austria) Nadiia Rekun	SCW Wien
2019	Production Optic	(Austria) Sonja Ladisich	(Austria) Ulrike Wagner	(Austria)	SSV Vöcklabruck
2019	Revolver	(Austria) Doris Reiter	(Austria)	(Austria)	SCW Wien
2019	PCC	(Austria) Yvonne Pavlik	(Austria) Bettina Wildmann	(Austria) Sigrid Felder	SGW Leobersdorf
2020	Open	(Austria) Edeltraud Aigner	(Austria) Doris Nestl-Treiber	(Austria) Sandra Kneringer	SCW Wien
2020	Standard	(Austria) Elisabeth Strasser	(Austria) Christa Hochholdinger	(Austria) Tamara Döllerer	SCW Wien
2020	Production Optic	(Austria) Ulrike Wagner	(Austria)	(Austria)	SCW Wien
2021	Open	(Austria) Margit Steurer	(Austria) Edeltraud Aigner	(Austria) Andrea Dvorak	SCW Wien
2021	Standard	(Austria) Christa Hochholdinger	(Austria) Elisabeth Strasser	(Austria) Gerlinde Bittermann	SCW Wien
2021	Production Optic	(Austria) Ulrike Wagner	(Austria)	(Austria)	SCW Wien
2021	PCC	(Austria) Katharina Schneider	(Austria) Karin Peer	(Austria) Bettina Wildmann	SSV Vöcklabruck
2022	Standard	(Austria) Katharina Schneider	(Austria) Elisabeth Strasser	(Austria) Edeltraud Aigner	SGW Leobersdorf
2023	Mini Rifle	(Austria) Susanne Entholzer	(Austria) Barbara Singer	(Austria) Claudia Grüneis	SCW Wien
2023	Production	(Austria) Katharina Schneider	(Austria) Elisabeth Strasser	(Austria) Christa Stundner	SSV Vöcklabruck

=== Junior Category ===
Year	Division	Gold	Silver	Bronze	Venue
2019	PCC	(Austria) Maximilian Toth	(Austria)	(Austria)	SGW Leobersdorf
2021	Standard	(Austria) Mark Schröfl			SCW Wien
2023	Mini Rifle	(Austria) Hermann Birner	(Austria) Julian Weissböck	(Austria) Jana Entholzer	SCW Wien
2023	Classic	(Austria) Samuel Pflügl			SSV Vöcklabruck

=== Senior Category ===
Year	Division	Gold	Silver	Bronze	Venue
1994	Open	(Austria) Fritz Carmann	(Austria) Walter Wellendorf	(Austria) Peter Fischer	
1994	Standard	(Austria) Gerhard Petritsch	(Austria) Klaus Leitner	(Austria) Fritz Steyskal	
1995	Open	(Austria) Albert Steinmueller	(Austria)	(Austria)	
1996	Standard	(Austria) Hubert Ceh	(Austria) Fritz Carmann	(Austria) Heinz Jelinek	
1997	Standard	(Austria) Hubert Ceh	(Austria) Fritz Carmann	(Austria) Heinz Jelinek	SGW Leobersdorf
2001	Standard	(Austria) Hubert Ceh	(Austria) Heinz Kohler	(Austria) Walter Wellendorf	
2004	Open	(Austria) Wolfgang Kugler	(Austria) Hubert Mühlbacher	(Austria) Anton Fuchs	
2004	Standard	(Austria) Hubert Ceh	(Austria) Peter Linduska	(Austria) Ludwig Schneeberger	
2004	Revolver	(Austria) Rudolf Willhalm Sen.	(Austria) Erich Ferstl	(Austria) Anton Fuchs	
2006	Open	(Austria) Kurt Ranner	(Austria) Hubert Mühlbacher	(Austria) Gerhard Stiegler	
2006	Standard	(Austria) Karl Hayszan	(Austria) Karl Laukes	(Austria) Günther Käferböck	
2006	Revolver	(Austria) Franz Leitner	(Austria) Klaus Willhalm	(Austria) Rudolf Willhalm	
2007	Open	(Austria) Franz Volk	(Austria) Kurt Ranner	(Austria) Roland Schwanneke	PSSV Graz
2007	Standard	(Austria) Karl Laukes	(Austria) Franz Mulz	(Austria) Gerhard Stiegler	PSSV Graz
2007	Revolver	(Austria) Rudolf Willhalm	(Austria) Klaus Willhalm	(Austria) Ernst Ausweger	PSSV Graz
2008	Open	(Austria) Gerhard Gingl	(Austria) Alois Stampfl	(Austria) Kurt Lichtl	PSV Linz
2008	Standard	(Austria) Leopold Rados	(Austria) Gerhard Pendlmayr	(Austria) Franz Mulz	PSV Linz
2008	Revolver	(Austria) Klaus Willhalm	(Austria) Ernst Ausweger	(Austria) Rudolf Willhalm	PSV Linz
2009	Open	(Austria) Andreas Schwab	(Austria) Kurt Ranner	(Austria) Gerhard Gingl	SCW Wien
2009	Production	(Austria) Christian Lampel	(Austria) Josef Haslinger	(Austria)	SCW Wien
2009	Standard	(Austria) Klaus Mayrhofer	(Austria) Leo Strohmayer	(Austria) Hermann Kirchweger	SCW Wien
2009	Revolver	(Austria) Klaus Willhalm	(Austria) Rudolf Willhalm	(Austria) Erich Ferstl	SCW Wien
2010	Open	(Austria) Roland Kraushofer	(Austria) Leo Strohmayer	(Austria) Hermann Kirchweger	PSV Linz-Steyregg
2010	Production	(Austria) Gottfried Post	(Austria) Alois Schelling	(Austria) Hannes Hofer	PSV Linz-Steyregg
2010	Standard	(Austria) Gottfried Post	(Austria) Hermann Kirchweger	(Austria) Thomas Birner	PSSV Graz
2010	Revolver	(Austria) Rudolf Willhalm	(Austria) Erich Ferstl	(Austria) Ernst Ausweger	PSSV Graz
2011	Open	(Austria) Roland Kraushofer	(Austria) Leo Strohmayr	(Austria) Kurt Ranner	SCW Wien
2011	Production	(Austria) Florian Kendelbacher	(Austria) Friedrich Ziebart	(Austria) Christian Breitler	SCW Wien
2011	Standard	(Austria) Hermann Kirchweger	(Austria) Leo Strohmayer	(Austria) Klaus Mayrhofer	PSV Linz-Steyregg
2011	Revolver	(Austria) Hermann Kirchweger	(Austria) Richard Schaubmair	(Austria) Christian Breitler	PSV Linz-Steyregg
2012	Open	(Austria) Roland Kraushofer	(Austria) Leo Strohmayer	(Austria) Christian Breitler	PSSV Graz
2012	Production	(Austria) Gottfried Post	(Austria) Friedrich Ziebart	(Austria) Florian Kendlbacher	PSSV Graz
2012	Standard	(Austria) Leo Strohmayer	(Austria) Friedrich Ziebart	(Austria) Hermann Kirchweger	PSSV Graz
2012	Revolver	(Austria) Hermann Kirchweger	(Austria) Richard Schaubmair	(Austria) Klaus Willhalm	PSSV Graz
2013	Open	(Austria) Roland Kraushofer	(Austria) Franz Volk	(Austria) Leo Strohmayer	SCW Wien
2013	Production	(Austria) Friedrich Ziebarth	(Austria) Gottfried Post	(Austria) Christian Breitler	SCW Wien
2013	Standard	(Austria) Friedrich Ziebarth	(Austria) Franz Volk	(Austria) Christian Breitler	PSSV Graz
2013	Revolver	(Austria) Richard Schaubmair	(Austria) Christian Breitler	(Austria) Ernst Ausweger	PSSV Graz
2013	Classic	(Austria) Christian Breitler	(Austria) Walter Geppert	(Austria)	SCW Wien
2014	Open	(Austria) Andreas Stettin	(Austria) Roland Kraushofer	(Austria) Leo Strohmayer	SCW Wien
2014	Production	(Austria) Gottfried Post	(Austria) Friedrich Ziebarth	(Austria) Florian Kendlbacher	SCW Wien
2014	Standard	(Austria) Leo Strohmayer	(Austria) Hermann Kirchweger	(Austria) Franz Volk	PSSV Graz
2014	Revolver	(Austria) Edgar Praschinger	(Austria) Richard Schaubmair	(Austria) Ernst Ausweger	PSSV Graz
2014	Classic	(Austria) Christian Breitler	(Austria) Andreas Stettin	(Austria) Franz Volk	SCW Wien
2015	Open	(Austria) Franz Volk	(Austria) Leo Strohmayer	(Austria) Edgar Praschinger	
2015	Production	(Austria) Walter Hochholdinger	(Austria) Florian Kendlbacher	(Austria) Christian Breitler	
2015	Classic	(Austria) Christian Breitler	(Austria) Franz Volk	(Austria) Thomas Klaus	
2016	Open	(Austria) Edgar Praschinger	(Austria) Ralph Leutgeb	(Austria) Gerhard Brunnmayr	PSSV Graz
2016	Standard	(Austria) Hermann Kirchweger	(Austria) Martin Kronberger	(Austria) Edgar Praschinger	PSSV Graz
2016	Production	(Austria) Gottfried Post	(Austria) Edgar Praschinger	(Austria) Florian Kendlbacher	PSSV Graz
2016	Revolver	(Austria) Hermann Kirchweger	(Austria) Martin Kronberger	(Austria) Edgar Praschinger	PSSV Graz
2016	Classic	(Austria) Thomas Klaus	(Austria) Robert Hasenkopf	(Austria) Christian Breitler	PSSV Graz
2017	Open	(Austria) Edgar Praschinger	(Austria) Roland Kraushofer	(Austria) Ralph Leutgeb	PSSV Graz
2017	Standard	(Austria) Leo Strohmayer	(Austria) Edgar Praschinger	(Austria) Hermann Kirchweger	SSV Vöcklabruck
2017	Production	(Austria) Florian Kendlbacher	(Austria) Edgar Praschinger	(Austria) Walter Hochholdinger	PSSV Graz
2017	Revolver	(Austria) Hermann Kirchweger	(Austria) Edgar Praschinger	(Austria) Josef Herbeck	SSV Vöcklabruck
2017	Classic	(Austria) Thomas Klaus	(Austria) Dietmar Pfeifer	(Austria) Christian Breitler	PSSV Graz
2018	Open	(Austria) Edgar Praschinger	(Austria) Alexander Eisl	(Austria) Claus Slama	PSSV Graz
2018	Standard	(Austria) Thomas Birner	(Austria) Leo Strohmayer	(Austria) Gottfried Post	SSV Vöcklabruck
2018	Production	(Austria) Reinhard Handl	(Austria) Walter Hochholdinger	(Austria) Thomas Benesch	PSSV Graz
2018	Production Optic	(Austria) Thomas Klaus	(Austria) Christian Breitler	(Austria) Gerhard Bunnmayr	SSV Vöcklabruck
2018	Revolver	(Austria) Johann Lang	(Austria) Edgar Praschinger	(Austria) Alexander Eisl	SSV Vöcklabruck
2018	Classic	(Austria) Reinhard Handl	(Austria) Thomas Benesch	(Austria) Thomas Klaus	PSSV Graz
2019	Open	(Austria) Edgar Praschinger	(Austria) Stefan Zeindl	(Austria) Claus Slama	SCW Wien
2019	Standard	(Austria) Reinhard Handl	(Austria) Gottfried Post	(Austria) Manfred Winkler	SSV Vöcklabruck
2019	Production	(Austria) Reinhard Handl	(Austria) Manfred Winkler	(Austria) Thomas Benesch	SCW Wien
2019	Production Optic	(Austria) Edgar Praschinger	(Austria) Rudolf Dastych	(Austria) Heinz Christian Hofer	SSV Vöcklabruck
2019	Revolver	(Austria) Johann Lang	(Austria) Werner Dostal	(Austria) Josef Herbeck	SCW Wien
2019	Classic	(Austria) Dietmar Pfeifer	(Austria) Werner Dostal	(Austria) Christian Breitler	SSV Vöcklabruck
2019	PCC	(Austria) Thomas Benesch	(Austria) Wolfgang Waldschütz	(Austria) Edgar Praschinger	SGW Leobersdorf
2020	Open	(Austria) Stefan Zeindl	(Austria) Edgar Praschinger	(Austria) Claus Slama	SCW Wien
2020	Standard	(Austria) Manfred Winkler	(Austria) Thomas Benesch	(Austria) Johann Lang	SCW Wien
2020	Production Optic	(Austria) Bosko Rasovic	(Austria) Rudolf Dastych	(Austria) Christian Hofer	SCW Wien
2021	Open	(Austria) Stefan Zeindl	(Austria) Claus Slama	(Austria) Alexander Eisl	SCW Wien
2021	Standard	(Austria) Thomas Benesch	(Austria) Manfred Winkler	(Austria) Hannes Hutter	SCW Wien
2021	Production Optic	(Austria) Edgar Praschinger	(Austria) Heinz Christian Hofer	(Austria) Georg Müller	SCW Wien
2021	PCC	(Austria) Gerald Reiter	(Austria) Stefan Zeindl	(Austria) Thomas Benesch	SSV Vöcklabruck
2022	Standard	(Austria) Bosko Rasovic	(Austria) Thomas Benesch	(Austria) Franz Sickinger	SGW Leobersdorf
2022	Classic	(Austria) Christian Breitler	(Austria) Markus Drexler	(Austria) Peter Weghofer	SGW Leobersdorf
2022	Revolver	(Austria) Gerald Reiter	(Austria) Johann Lang	(Austria) Hermann Kirchweger	SGW Leobersdorf
2023	Mini Rifle	(Austria) Dieter Scherz	(Austria) Thomas Benesch	(Austria) Edgar Praschinger	SCW Wien
2023	Production	(Austria) Reinhard Handl	(Austria) Bosko Rasovic	(Austria) Manfred Winkler	SSV vöcklabruck
2023	Classic	(Austria) Thomas Benesch	(Austria) Maximilian Huber	(Austria) Robert Hasenkopf	SSV vöcklabruck
2023	Revolver	(Austria) Gerald Reiter	(Austria) Johann Lang	(Austria) Werner Feyertag	SSV vöcklabruck

=== Super Senior Category ===
Year	Division	Gold	Silver	Bronze	Venue
2004	Open	(Austria) Helmut Ilc	(Austria) Günter Baumgartner	(Austria) Josef Jelinek	
2004	Standard	(Austria) Dieter Laiss	(Austria) Georg Deutschbein	(Austria) Walter Wellendorf	
2006	Open	(Austria) Wolfgang Kugler	(Austria) Helmut Ilc	(Austria) Alois Stampfl	
2006	Standard	(Austria) Peter Fischer	(Austria) Georg Deutschbein	(Austria) Dieter Laiss	
2006	Revolver	(Austria) Manfred Einramhof	(Austria) Hermann Steinkellner	(Austria)	
2007	Open	(Austria) Wolfgang Kugler	(Austria) Anton Fuchs	(Austria) Alois Stampfl	PSSV Graz
2007	Standard	(Austria) Dieter Laiss	(Austria) Hubert Ceh	(Austria) Peter Fischer	PSSV Graz
2007	Revolver	(Austria) Anton Fuchs	(Austria) Manfred Einrahmhof	(Austria) Hermann Steinkellner	PSSV Graz
2008	Open	(Austria) Anton Fuchs	(Austria) Wolfgang Kugler	(Austria) Gert Glock	PSV Linz
2008	Standard	(Austria) Dieter Laiss	(Austria) Hubert Ceh	(Austria) Hubert Mühlbacher	PSV Linz
2008	Revolver	(Austria) Anton Fuchs	(Austria) Dieter Laiss	(Austria) Manfred Einrahmhof	PSV Linz
2009	Open	(Austria) Helmut Ilc	(Austria) Adam Lennert	(Austria) Wolfgang Kugler	SCW Wien
2009	Standard	(Austria) Dieter Laiss	(Austria) Ronald Riedel	(Austria) Miomir Bjelic	SCW Wien
2009	Revolver	(Austria) Dieter Laiss	(Austria) Hermann Steinkellner	(Austria) Manfred Einramhof	SCW Wien
2010	Open	(Austria) Anton Fuchs	(Austria) Adam Lennert	(Austria) Hubert Mühlbacher	PSV Linz-Steyregg
2010	Production	(Austria) Ronald Riedel	(Austria) Adam Lennert	(Austria) Hubert Mühlbacher	PSV Linz-Steyregg
2010	Standard	(Austria) Hubert Mühlbacher	(Austria) Anton Fuchs	(Austria) Dieter Laiss	PSSV Graz
2010	Revolver	(Austria) Anton Fuchs	(Austria) Dieter Laiss	(Austria) Manfred Einrahmhof	PSSV Graz
2011	Open	(Austria) Anton Fuchs	(Austria) Wolfgang Kugler	(Austria) Alois Stampfl	SCW Wien
2011	Production	(Austria) Adam Lennert	(Austria) Ronald Riedel	(Austria) Hubert Ceh	SCW Wien
2011	Standard	(Austria) Hubert Mühlbacher	(Austria) Ronald Riedel	(Austria) Wolfgang Kugler	PSV Linz-Steyregg
2011	Revolver	(Austria) Erich Ferstl	(Austria) Manfred Einrahmhof	(Austria)	PSV Linz-Steyregg
2012	Open	(Austria) Anton Fuchs	(Austria) Kurt Ranner	(Austria) Wolfgang Kugler	PSSV Graz
2012	Production	(Austria) Adam Lennert	(Austria) Karl Laukes	(Austria) Hubert Ceh	PSSV Graz
2012	Standard	(Austria) Hubert Mühlbacher	(Austria) Karl Laukes	(Austria) Günther Bürger	PSSV Graz
2012	Revolver	(Austria) Dieter Laiss	(Austria) Anton Fuchs	(Austria) Manfred Einrahmhof	PSSV Graz
2013	Open	(Austria) Anton Fuchs	(Austria) Wolfgang Kugler	(Austria) Alois Stampfl	SCW Wien
2013	Production	(Austria) Adam Lennert	(Austria) Ronald Riedel	(Austria) Karl Laukes	SCW Wien
2013	Standard	(Austria) Wolfgang Kugler	(Austria) Ronald Riedel	(Austria) Karl Laukes	PSSV Graz
2013	Revolver	(Austria) Rudolf Willhalm	(Austria) Klaus Willhalm	(Austria) Erich Ferstl	PSSV Graz
2014	Open	(Austria) Wolfgang Kugler	(Austria) Alois Stampfl	(Austria) Kurt Ranner	SCW Wien
2014	Production	(Austria) Karl Laukes	(Austria) Ronald Riedel	(Austria) Hubert Mühlbacher	SCW Wien
2014	Standard	(Austria) Hubert Mühlbacher	(Austria) Karl Laukes	(Austria) Anton Fuchs	PSSV Graz
2014	Revolver	(Austria) Klaus Willhalm	(Austria) Rudolf Willhalm	(Austria) Dieter Laiss	PSSV Graz
2015	Open	(Austria) Alois Stampfl	(Austria) Anton Fuchs	(Austria) Kurt Ranner	
2015	Production	(Austria) Adam Lennert	(Austria) Karl Laukes	(Austria) Hubert Mühlbacher	
2015	Classic	(Austria) Franz Feichtner	(Austria) Kurt Rapp	(Austria)	
2016	Open	(Austria) Franz Volk	(Austria) Alois Stampfl	(Austria) Kurt Ranner	PSSV Graz
2016	Standard	(Austria) Karl Laukes	(Austria) Hannes Hofer	(Austria) Ronald Riedl	PSSV Graz
2016	Production	(Austria) Karl Laukes	(Austria) Ronald Riedl	(Austria) Anton Fuchs	PSSV Graz
2016	Revolver	(Austria) Rudolf Willhalm	(Austria) Wolfgang Oberaigner	(Austria) Manfred Einrahmhof	PSSV Graz
2016	Classic	(Austria) Franz Volk	(Austria) Franz Feichtner	(Austria)	PSSV Graz
2017	Open	(Austria) Franz Volk	(Austria) Anton Fuchs	(Austria) Alois Stampfl	PSSV Graz
2017	Standard	(Austria) Franz Mulz	(Austria) Hubert Mühlbacher	(Austria) Hannes Hofer	SSV Vöcklabruck
2017	Production	(Austria) Hannes Hofer	(Austria) Günther Käferböck	(Austria) Adam Lennert	PSSV Graz
2017	Revolver	(Austria) Rudolf Willhalm	(Austria) Klaus Willhalm	(Austria) Erich Ferstl	SSV Vöcklabruck
2018	Open	(Austria) Franz Volk	(Austria) Anton Fuchs	(Austria) Kurt Ranner	PSSV Graz
2018	Standard	(Austria) Hubert Mühlbacher	(Austria) Franz Mulz	(Austria) Siegfried Zagler	SSV Vöcklabruck
2018	Production	(Austria) Günther Käferböck	(Austria) Siegfried Zagler	(Austria) Adam Lennert	PSSV Graz
2018	Production Optic	(Austria) Bjelic Miomir	(Austria)	(Austria)	SSV Vöcklabruck
2018	Revolver	(Austria) Alexander Molitor	(Austria) Rudolf Willhalm	(Austria) Manfred Einrahmhof	SSV Vöcklabruck
2018	Classic	(Austria) Franz Volk	(Austria) Siegfried Zahgler	(Austria) Manfred Preuner	PSSV Graz
2019	Open	(Austria) Franz Volk	(Austria) Kurt Kreuzer	(Austria) Wolfgang Kugler	SCW Wien
2019	Standard	(Austria) Leo Strohmayer	(Austria) Hubert Mühlbacher	(Austria) Rupert Krassnig	SSV Vöcklabruck
2019	Production	(Austria) Ronald Riedel	(Austria) Siegfried Zagler	(Austria) Franz Feichtner	SCW Wien
2019	Revolver	(Austria) Hermann Kirchweger	(Austria)	(Austria)	SCW Wien
2019	PCC	(Austria) Michael Katscher	(Austria) Manfred Preuner	(Austria) Ludwig Brückler	SGW Leobersdorf
2020	Open	(Austria) Klaus Willhalm	(Austria) Wolfgang Kugler	(Austria) Kurt Kreuzer	SCW Wien
2020	Standard	(Austria) Gottfried Post	(Austria) Hermann Kirchweger	(Austria) Hannes Hofer	SCW Wien
2020	Production Optic	(Austria) Ludwig Brückler	(Austria) Heribert Kammerstetter	(Austria)	SCW Wien
2021	Open	(Austria) Franz Volk	(Austria) Günter Weber	(Austria) Klaus Willhalm	SCW Wien
2021	Standard	(Austria) Friedrich Ziebart	(Austria) Florian Kendlbacher	(Austria) Franz Mulz	SCW Wien
2021	Production Optic	(Austria) Christian Breitler	(Austria) Franz Berger	(Austria) Ludwig Brückler	SCW Wien
2021	PCC	(Austria) Hubert Mühlbacher	(Austria) Richard Schaubmair	(Austria) Martin Fischer	SSV Vöcklabruck
2022	Standard	(Austria) Thomas Birner	(Austria) Friedrich Ziebart	(Austria) Gerhard Heimburger	SGW Leobersdorf
2023	Mini Rifle	(Austria) Manfred Preuner	(Austria) Hubert Mühlbacher	(Austria) Johann Schmid	SCW Wien
2023	Production	(Austria) Friedrich Ziebart	(Austria) Ferdinand Schmidt	(Austria) Walter Hochholdinger	SSV Vöcklabruck
2023	Classic	(Austria) Christian Breitler	(Austria) Franz Mulz	(Austria) Robert Wiery	SSV Vöcklabruck
2023	Revolver	(Austria) Hermann Kirchweger	(Austria) Richard Schaubmair	(Austria) Klaus Wilhalm	SSV Vöcklabruck

=== Team Category ===
Year	Division	Gold	Silver	Bronze	Venue
1991	Open	(Austria) (Austria) (Austria)	NOE (Austria) Roland Kraushofer (Austria) Franz Michael Pratschner (Austria) Walter Pöchhacker	(Austria) (Austria) (Austria)	SCW Wien
1997	Standard	NOE (Austria) Thomas Hinterberger (Austria) Michael Pratschner (Austria) Friedrich Ziebart	WIEN (Austria) Peter Bauer (Austria) Norbert Mühlbacher (Austria) Robert Pichler	STMK (Austria) Franz Volk (Austria) Andreas Stettin (Austria) Heinrich Maier	SGW Leobersdorf
2007	Open	STMK (Austria) Alexander Volk (Austria) Andreas Stettin (Austria) Wolfram Hiebler (Austria) Udo Loibner	TIROL (Austria) Günter Weber (Austria) Margit Steurer (Austria) Gerhard Crepaz (Austria) Martin Mair	WIEN (Austria) Gabriele Kraushofer (Austria) Harald Schallerbauer (Austria) Markus Altmann (Austria) Roland Kraufshofer	PSSV Graz
2007	Standard	OOE (Austria) Klaus Mayerhofer (Austria) Johann Baminger (Austria) Gottfried Post (Austria) Martin Kronberger	WIEN (Austria) Jürgen Stranz (Austria) Mario Kneringer (Austria) Robert Pichler (Austria) Claus Slama	STMK (Austria) Gernot Siber (Austria) Leopold Rados (Austria) Dietmar Pfeifer (Austria) Bernd Jaklitsch	PSSV Graz
2007	Revolver	OOE (Austria) Martin Kronberger (Austria) Kurt Partinger (Austria) Richard Schaubmair (Austria) Ernst Ausweger	STMK (Austria) Gernot Siber (Austria) Dietmar Pfeifer (Austria) Anton Fuchs (Austria) Gerhard Stiegler	NOE (Austria) Rudolf Willhalm (Austria) Klaus Willhalm (Austria) Erich Ferstl	PSSV Graz
2008	Open	STMK (Austria) Alexander Volk (Austria) Wolfram Hiebler (Austria) Franz Volk (Austria) Udo Loibner	WIEN (Austria) Mario Kneringer (Austria) Roland Kraushofer (Austria) Markus Altmann (Austria) Gabriele Kraushofer	TIROL (Austria) Günter Weber (Austria) Margit Steurer (Austria) Gerhard Crepaz (Austria) Martin Mair	PSV Linz
2008	Standard	OOE (Austria) Johann Baminger (Austria) Klaus Hörmanseder (Austria) Klaus Mayhofer (Austria) Martin Kronberger	NOE (Austria) Leo Strohmayer (Austria) Hermann Kirchweger (Austria) Friedrich Ziebart (Austria) Christian Breitler	STMK (Austria) Gernot Siber (Austria) Bernd Jaklitsch (Austria) Dietmar Pfeifer (Austria) Gerhard Edelmann	PSV Linz
2008	Revolver	NOE (Austria) Hermann Kirchweger (Austria) Peter Zöchlinger (Austria) Rudolf Willhalm (Austria) Josef Herbeck	OOE (Austria) Martin Kronberger (Austria) Richard Schaubmair (Austria) Kurt Partinger (Austria) Ernst Ausweger	STMK (Austria) Gernot Siber (Austria) Dietmar Pfeifer (Austria) Wolfgang Koch	PSV Linz
2009	Open	WIEN (Austria) Mario Kneringer (Austria) Gabriele Kraushofer (Austria) Harald Schallerbauer (Austria) Roland Kraushofer	STMK (Austria) Alexander Volk (Austria) Franz Volk (Austria) Wolfram Hiebler (Austria) Udo Loibner	TIROL (Austria) Günter Weber (Austria) Margit Steurer (Austria) Gerhard Crepaz (Austria) Paul Schmutzer	SCW Wien
2009	Production	WIEN (Austria) Dominik Stepan (Austria) Günther Kahry (Austria) Roland Römiger (Austria) Otto Hold	NOE (Austria) Friedrich Ziebart (Austria) Bosko Rasovic (Austria) Christian Breitler (Austria) Andreas Hutterer	VBG (Austria) Markus Huber (Austria) Alois Schelling (Austria) Gerald Hölzl (Austria) Peter Deflorian	SCW Wien
2009	Standard	OOE (Austria) Johann Baminger (Austria) Klaus Hörmanseder (Austria) Gottfried Post (Austria) Martin Kronberger	NOE (Austria) Edgar Praschinger (Austria) Dietmar Rauscher (Austria) Michael Kamler (Austria) Reinhard Arlt	STMK (Austria) Gernot Siber (Austria) Bernd Jaklitsch (Austria) Dietmar Pfeifer (Austria) Andreas Paumann	SCW Wien
2009	Revolver	NOE (Austria) Hermann Kirchweger (Austria) Christian Breitler (Austria) Josef Herbeck (Austria) Rudolf Willhalm	OOE (Austria) Martin Kronberger (Austria) Kurt Partinger (Austria) Richard Schaubmair (Austria)	STMK (Austria) Dietmar Pfeifer (Austria) Anton Fuchs (Austria) Gerhard Gingl (Austria) Günter Bürger	SCW Wien
2010	Open	STMK (Austria) Alexander Volk (Austria) Franz Volk (Austria) Udo Loibner (Austria) Hartmut Weber	WIEN (Austria) Mario Kneringer (Austria) Harald Schallerbauer (Austria) Gabriele Kraushofer (Austria) Claus Slama	KTN (Austria) Stefan Zeindl (Austria) Andreas Stettin (Austria) Gernot Siber (Austria) Philipp Trattler	PSV Linz-Steyregg
2010	Production	OOE (Austria) Gottfried Post (Austria) Reinhard Handl (Austria) Johann Baminger (Austria) Klaus Hörmanseder	KTN (Austria) Andreas Stettin (Austria) Gernot Siber (Austria) Thomas Ertl (Austria) Stefan Zeindl	BGLD (Austria) Gerald Reiter (Austria) Jürgen Stranz (Austria) Dietmar Knopf (Austria) Roland Mittermaier	PSV Linz-Steyregg
2010	Standard	KTN (Austria) Gernot Siber (Austria) Andreas Stettin (Austria) Stefan Zeindl (Austria) Thomas Marinitsch	OOE (Austria) Klaus Hörmanseder (Austria) Martin Kronberger (Austria) Robert Hasenkopf (Austria) Reinhard Handl	BGLD (Austria) Jürgen Stranz (Austria) Gerald Reiter (Austria) Roland Mittermaier (Austria) Robert Horvath	PSSV Graz
2010	Revolver	OOE (Austria) Martin Kronberger (Austria) Richard Schaubmair (Austria) Robert Hasenkopf (Austria) Ernst Ausweger	NOE (Austria) Hermann Kirchweger (Austria) Josef Herbeck (Austria) Christian Breitler (Austria) Edgar Praschinger	KTN (Austria) Gernot Siber (Austria) Thomas Ertl (Austria) Philipp Trattler (Austria) Günter Bürger	PSSV Graz
2011	Open	WIEN (Austria) Mario Kneringer (Austria) Gabriele Kraushofer (Austria) Ralp Leutgeb (Austria) Harald Schallerbauer	KTN (Austria) Stefan Zeindl (Austria) Andreas Stettin (Austria) Gernot Siber (Austria) Philipp Trattler	TIROL (Austria) Günter Weber (Austria) Margit Steurer (Austria) Günter Leitner (Austria) Paul Schmutzer	SCW Wien
2011	Production	BGLD (Austria) Gerald Reiter (Austria) Jürgen Stranz (Austria) Philipp Passesreiter (Austria) Christian Graner	NOE (Austria) Bosko Rasovic (Austria) Dietmar Rauscher (Austria) Andreas Eichinger (Austria) Peter Zöchlinger	KTN (Austria) Gernot Siber (Austria) Andreas Stettin (Austria) Georg Brenner (Austria) Stefan Zeindl	SCW Wien
2011	Standard	OOE (Austria) Gottfried Post (Austria) Martin Kronberger (Austria) Klaus Hörmanseder (Austria) Reinhard Handl	BGLD (Austria) Jürgen Stranz (Austria) Gerald Reiter (Austria) Wolfgang Kugler (Austria) Philipp Passesreiter	KTN (Austria) Gernot Siber (Austria) Andreas Stettin (Austria) Thomas Ertl (Austria) Georg Brenner	PSV Linz-Steyregg
2011	Revolver	NOE (Austria) Rudolf Willhalm Jun. (Austria) Edgar Praschinger (Austria) Peter Zöchlinger (Austria) Reschenhofer Roman	KTN (Austria) Gernot Siber (Austria) Thomas Ertl (Austria) Andreas Stettin (Austria) Philipp Trattler	OOE (Austria) Martin Kronberger (Austria) Robet Kroiss	PSV Linz-Steyregg
2012	Open	STMK (Austria) Alexander Volk (Austria) Franz Volk (Austria) Andreas Stettin (Austria) Udo Loibner	WIEN (Austria) Mario Kneringer (Austria) Harald Schallerbauer (Austria) Gabriele Kraushofer (Austria) Ralph Leutgeb	OOE (Austria) Wolfgang Fritzl (Austria) Notburga Hasenkopf (Austria) Wilfried Fischer (Austria) Heinrich Neumeier	PSSV Graz
2012	Production	STMK (Austria) Gernot Siber (Austria) Andreas Stettin (Austria) Hans Georg Koller (Austria) Christoph Fischer	OOE (Austria) Andreas Oriol (Austria) Reinhard Handl (Austria) Manfred Winkler (Austria) Klaus Hörmanseder	WIEN (Austria) Mario Kneringer (Austria) Michael Kamler (Austria) Thomas Benesch (Austria) Arthur Pavlasek	PSSV Graz
2012	Standard	BGLD (Austria) Gerald Reiter (Austria) Jürgen Stranz (Austria) Robert Horvath (Austria) Johann Lang	OOE (Austria) Klaus Hörmanseder (Austria) Reinhard Handl (Austria) Martin Kronberger (Austria) Gottfried Post	NOE (Austria) Dietmar Rauscher (Austria) Edgar Praschinger (Austria) Bosko Rasovic (Austria) Alexander Eisl	PSSV Graz
2012	Revolver	NOE (Austria) Hermann Kirchweger (Austria) Edgar Praschinger (Austria) Rudolf Willhalm Jun. (Austria) Roman Reschenhofer	OOE (Austria) Martin Kronberger (Austria) Robert Kroiss (Austria) Richard Schaubmair (Austria) Dieter Laiss	STMK (Austria) Gernot Siber (Austria) Heinz Christian Hofer (Austria) Dietmar Pfeifer (Austria) Wolfgang	PSSV Graz
2013	Open	WIEN (Austria) Mario Kneringer (Austria) Roland Kraushofer (Austria) Claus Slama (Austria) Ralph Leutgeb	STMK (Austria) Alexander Volk (Austria) Franz Volk (Austria) Gernot Siber	OOE (Austria) Wilfried Fischer (Austria) Klaus Hörmanseder (Austria) Wolfram Hiebler (Austria) Wolfgang Fritzl	SCW Wien
2013	Production	OOE (Austria) Reinhard Handl (Austria) Andreas Oriol (Austria) Gottfried Post (Austria) Manfred Winkler	NOE (Austria) Bosko Rasovic (Austria) Dietmar Rauscher (Austria) Maximilian Huber (Austria) Simon Heiligenbrunner	BGLD (Austria) Gerald Reiter (Austria) Jürgen Stranz (Austria) Johann Stranz (Austria) Robert Horvath	SCW Wien
2013	Standard	OOE (Austria) Reinhard Handl (Austria) Klaus Hörmanseder (Austria) Gottfried Post (Austria) Martin Kronberger	NOE (Austria) Hermann Kirchweger (Austria) Bosko Rasovic (Austria) Dietmar Rauscher (Austria) Maximilian Huber	BGLD (Austria) Jürgen Stranz (Austria) Gerald Reiter (Austria) Michael Szokoll (Austria) Robert Horvath	PSSV Graz
2013	Revolver	NOE (Austria) Hermann Kirchweger (Austria) Edgar Praschinger (Austria) Rudolf Willhalm (Austria) Roman Reschenhofer	OOE (Austria) Martin Kronberger (Austria) Reinhard Handl (Austria) Robert Kroiss (Austria) Richard Schaubmair	STMK (Austria) Gernot Siber (Austria) Heinz Christian Hofer (Austria) Dietmar Pfeifer	PSSV Graz
2014	Open	WIEN (Austria) Mario Kneringer (Austria) Ralph Leutgeb (Austria) Roland Kraushofer (Austria) Claus Slama	STMK (Austria) Alexander Volk (Austria) Andreas Stettin (Austria) Gernot Siber (Austria) Franz Volk	NOE (Austria) Roman Reschenhofer (Austria) Norbert Dotter (Austria) Alexander Eisl (Austria) Michael Aigner	SCW Wien
2014	Production	OOE (Austria) Andreas Oriol (Austria) Reinhard Handl (Austria) Gottfried Post (Austria) Johann Baminger	WIEN (Austria) Mario Kneringer (Austria) Gerald Stacherl (Austria) Michael Kamler (Austria) Thomas Benesch	NOE (Austria) Bosko Rasovic (Austria) Maximilian Huber (Austria) Dietmar Rauscher (Austria) Christian Pawle	SCW Wien
2014	Standard	OOE (Austria) Reinhard Handl (Austria) Gottfried Post (Austria) Klaus Hörmanseder (Austria) Martin Kronberger	BGLD (Austria) Jürgen Stranz (Austria) Gerald Reiter (Austria) Johann Lang (Austria) Robert Horvath	WIEN (Austria) Mario Kneringer (Austria) Gerald Stacherl (Austria) Claus Slama (Austria) Michael Bogner	PSSV Graz
2014	Revolver	OOE (Austria) Martin Kronberger (Austria) Robert Kroiss (Austria) Reinhard Handl (Austria) Manfred Einrahmhof	NOE (Austria) Roman Reschenhofer (Austria) Rudolf Willhalm (Austria) Edgar Praschinger (Austria) Peter Zöchlinger	BGLD (Austria) Gerald Reiter (Austria) Manuel Schnaitt (Austria) Walter Wellendorf (Austria) Wolfgang Kugler	PSSV Graz
2014	Classic	WIEN (Austria) Gerald Stacherl (Austria) Mario Kneringer (Austria) Markus Stutterecker (Austria) Claus Slama	NOE (Austria) Maximilien Huber (Austria) Christian Breitler (Austria) Dietmar Rauscher (Austria) Marcus Karlin	STMK (Austria) Gernot Siber (Austria) Andreas Stettin (Austria) Franz Volk (Austria) Dietmar Pfeifer	SCW Wien
2016	Open	NOE (Austria) Rudolf Wilham Jun. (Austria) Edgar Praschinger (Austria) Bosko Rasovic (Austria) Alexander Eisl	WIEN (Austria) Mario Kneringer (Austria) Ralph Leutgeb (Austria) Claus Slama (Austria) Walter Soucek-Rädler	STMK (Austria) Alexander Volk (Austria) Heimo Hintermüller (Austria) Franz Volk (Austria) Gernot Sieber	PSSV Graz
2016	Standard	BGLD (Austria) Jürgen Stranz (Austria) Gerald Reiterr (Austria) Johann Lang (Austria) Robert Horvath	OOE (Austria) Gottfried Post (Austria) Reinhard Handl (Austria) Klaus Hörmanseder (Austria) Martin Kornberger	NOE (Austria) Bosko Rasovic (Austria) Maximilian Huber (Austria) Sebastian Spring (Austria) Rene Berger	PSSV Graz
2016	Production	WIEN (Austria) Mario Kneringer (Austria) Gerald Stacherl (Austria) Bernhard Schlegl (Austria) Michael Karges	OOE (Austria) Andreas Oriol (Austria) Manfred Winkler (Austria) Klaus Hörmanseder (Austria) Johann Baminger	STMK (Austria) Hans-Georg Koller (Austria) Andreas Gaberscik (Austria) Patrick Stremitzer (Austria) Michael Freiberger	PSSV Graz
2016	Revolver	OOE (Austria) Reinhard Handl (Austria) Robert Kroiss (Austria) Martin Kronberger (Austria) Erich Bohn	BGLD (Austria) Reiter gerald (Austria) Johann Lang (Austria) Manuel Schnaitt (Austria) Desiree Schnaitt	NOE (Austria) Wilham Rudolf jun. (Austria) Werner Feiertag (Austria) Michael Katscher (Austria) Alexander Eisl	PSSV Graz
2016	Classic	NOE (Austria) Maximilian Huber (Austria) Bosko Rasovic (Austria) Dietmar Rauscher (Austria) Christian Breitler	BGLD (Austria) Gerald Reiter (Austria) Johann Lang (Austria) Manuel Schnaitt (Austria) Jürgen Schmidt	WIEN (Austria) Mario Kneringer (Austria) Gerald Stacherl (Austria) Peter Weghofer (Austria) Erwin Kochmann	PSSV Graz
2017	Open	WIEN (Austria) Mario Kneringer (Austria) Martin Theilinger (Austria) Claus Slama (Austria) Walter Soucek-Rädler	NOE (Austria) Edgar Praschinger (Austria) Gabriele Kraushofer (Austria) Roland Kraushofer (Austria) Rudolf Wilham jun.	STMK (Austria) Alexander Volk (Austria) Heimo Hintermüller (Austria) Franz Volk (Austria) Christoph Ebner	PSSV Graz
2017	Standard	BGLD (Austria) Gerald Reiter (Austria) Jürgen Stranz (Austria) Michael Szokoll (Austria) Johann Lang	OOE (Austria) Reinhard Handl (Austria) Klaus Hörmanseder (Austria) Manfred Winkler (Austria) Walter Hochholdinger	NOE (Austria) Bosko Rasovic (Austria) Maximilian Huber (Austria) Simon Heiligenbrunner (Austria) Martin Messerschmidt	SSV Vöcklabruck
2017	Production	NOE (Austria) Bosko Rasovic (Austria) Simon Heiligenbrunner (Austria) Maximilian Huber (Austria) Martin Messerschmidt	BGLD (Austria) Gerald Reiter (Austria) Jürgen Stranz (Austria) Johan Lang (Austria) Robert Horvath	OOE (Austria) Bemjamin Thallinger (Austria) Christoph Reitter (Austria) David Stundner (Austria) Walter Hochholdinger	PPSV Graz
2017	Revolver	BGLD (Austria) Gerald Reiter (Austria) Johann Lang (Austria) Manuel Schnaitt (Austria) Jürgen Schmidt	NOE (Austria) Hermann Kirchweger (Austria) Peter Zöchlinger (Austria) Edgar Praschinger (Austria) Erich Ferstl	OOE (Austria) Robert Kroiss (Austria) Erich Bohrn (Austria) Richard Schaubmair (Austria) Manfred Einrahmhof	SSV Vöcklabruck
2017	Classic	NOE (Austria) Maximilian Huber (Austria) Bosko Rasovic (Austria) Dietmar Rauscher (Austria) Markus Königsberger	BGLD (Austria) Gerald Reiter (Austria) Johann Lang (Austria) Manuel Schnaitt (Austria) Jürgen Schmidt	KNT (Austria) Stefan Zeindl (Austria) Thomas Arnold (Austria) Bernhard Perchthaler (Austria) Martin Urbanz	PSSV Graz
2018	Open	WIEN (Austria) Mario Kneringer (Austria) Martin Theilinger (Austria) Claus Slama (Austria) Ralph Leutgeb	BGLD (Austria) Gerald Reiter (Austria) Lukas Kutschi (Austria) Manuel Schnaitt (Austria) Ronald Putz	STMK (Austria) Alexander Volk (Austria) Franz Volk (Austria) Christoph Ebner (Austria) Fuchs Anton	PSSV Graz
2018	Standard	OOE (Austria) Reinhard Handl (Austria) Gottfried Post (Austria) Klaus Hörmanseder (Austria) Andreas Oriol	NOE (Austria) Bosko Rasovic (Austria) Leo Strohmayer (Austria) Maximilian Huber (Austria) Simon Heiligenbrunner	BGLD (Austria) Jürgen Stranz (Austria) Gerald Reiter (Austria) Lukas Kutschi (Austria) Robert Horvath	SSV Vöcklabruck
2018	Production	OOE (Austria) Benjamin Thallinger (Austria) Andreas Oriol (Austria) Manfred Winkler (Austria) Christoph Reitter	NOE (Austria) Bosko Rasovic (Austria) Martin Messerschmidt (Austria) Simon Heiligenbrunner (Austria) Maximilian Huber	STMK (Austria) Klaus Gasteiger (Austria) Patrick Stremitzer (Austria) Hans-Georg Koller (Austria) Thomas Hasenbacher	PSSV Graz
2018	Revolver	BGLD (Austria) Gerald Reiter (Austria) Johann Lang (Austria) Otmar Lorenz (Austria) Manuel Schnaitt	NOE (Austria) Edgar Praschinger (Austria) Roman Reschenhofer (Austria) Josef Herbeck (Austria) Hermann Kirchweger	OOE (Austria) Robert Kroiss (Austria) Richard Schaubmair (Austria) Manfred Einrahmhof	SSV Vöcklabruck
2018	Classic	NOE (Austria) Dietmar Rauscher (Austria) Maximilian Huber (Austria) Bosko Rasovic (Austria) Alexander Kastner	BGLD (Austria) Gerald Reiter (Austria) Johann Lang (Austria) Otmar Lorenz (Austria) Manuel Schnaitt	STMK (Austria) Christoph Fischer (Austria) Michael Freiberger (Austria) Alexander Volk (Austria) Dietmar Pfeifer	PSSV Graz
2019	Open	WIEN (Austria) Mario Kneringer (Austria) Martin Theilinger (Austria) Claus Slama (Austria) Michael Krautsdorfer	STMK (Austria) Alexander Volk (Austria) Franz Volk (Austria) Wolfram Hiebler (Austria) Norman Gaß	NOE (Austria) Edgar Praschinger (Austria) Roman Reschenhofer (Austria) Christian Maierhofer (Austria) Rudolf Willhalm	SCW Wien
2019	Standard	OOE (Austria) Reinhard Handl (Austria) Gottfried Post (Austria) Manfred Winkler (Austria) Thomas Birner	NOE (Austria) Simon Heiligenbrunner (Austria) Leo Strohmayer (Austria) Bosko Rasovic	BGLD (Austria) Jürgen Stranz (Austria) Otmar Lorenz (Austria) Michael Szokoll (Austria) Andreas Gruber	SSV Vöcklabruck
2019	Production	OOE (Austria) Benjamin Thallinger (Austria) Andreas Oriol (Austria) David Stundner (Austria) Thomas Lechner	NOE (Austria) Bosko Rasovic (Austria) Simon Heiligenbrunner (Austria) Alexander Kastner (Austria) Maximilian Huber	WIEN (Austria) Martin Thaler (Austria) Dominik Stepan (Austria) Thomas Benesch (Austria) Bernhard Schlegl	SCW Wien
2019	Production Optic	BGLD (Austria) Gerald Reiter (Austria) Manuel Schnaitt (Austria) Lukas Kutschi (Austria) Martin Prandstötter	NOE (Austria) Martin Meißner (Austria) Maximilian Huber (Austria) Rainer Ulreich (Austria) Jürgen Gebhardt	WIEN (Austria) Martin Thaler (Austria) Rudolf Dastych (Austria) Alphons Leo (Austria) Peter Veress	SSV Vöcklabruck
2019	Revolver	BGLD (Austria) Gerald Reiter (Austria) Johann Lang (Austria) Otmar Lorenz (Austria) Doris Reiter	NOE (Austria) Hermann Kirchweger (Austria) Thomas Kehr (Austria) Werner Dostal (Austria) Josef Herbeck	OOE (Austria) Robert Kroiss (Austria) Erich Bohn (Austria) Nikolaus Stelzmüller	SCW Wien
2019	Classic	NOE (Austria) Alexander Kastner (Austria) Markus Ebner (Austria) Dietmar Rauscher (Austria) Sascha Weiss	STMK (Austria) Michael Freiberger (Austria) Christoph Fischer (Austria) Dietmar Pfeifer (Austria) Andreas Schaffer	NOE (Austria) Michael Lindenbauer (Austria) Stefan Maschler (Austria) Christian Breitler (Austria) Michael Katscher	SSV Vöcklabruck
2020	Open	WIEN (Austria) Mario Kneringer (Austria) Martin Theilinger (Austria) Claus Slama (Austria) Michael Krautstorfer	BGLD (Austria) Gerald Reiter (Austria) Manuel Schnaitt (Austria) Lukas Kutschi (Austria) Wolfgang Kugler	NOE (Austria) Edgar Praschinger (Austria) Rudolf Willhalm (Austria) Roman Reschenhofer (Austria) Edeltraud Aigner	SCW Wien
2020	Standard	NOE (Austria) Simon Heiligenbrunner (Austria) Maximilian Huber (Austria) Alexander Kastner (Austria) Markus Ebner	OOE (Austria) Benjamin Thallinger (Austria) Reinhard Handl (Austria) Christoph Reitter (Austria) Thomas Häupl	BGLD (Austria) Jürgen Stranz (Austria) Otmar Lorenz (Austria) Johann Lang (Austria) Stefan Hayduk	SCW Wien
2020	Production Optic	NOE (Austria) Martin Meissner (Austria) Rainer Ulreich (Austria) Bosko Rasovic (Austria) Jürgen Gebhardt	OOE (Austria) Andreas Oriol (Austria) Markus Meindl (Austria) Stefan Dörsch (Austria) Martin Hummer	WIEN (Austria) Martin Thaler (Austria) Markus Stutterecker (Austria) Leo Alphons (Austria) Markus Drexler	SCW Wien
2021	Open	BGLD (Austria) Gerald Reiter (Austria) Manuel Schnaitt (Austria) Lukas Kutschi (Austria) Desiree Schnaitt	WIEN (Austria) Mario Kneringer (Austria) Martin Theilinger (Austria) Claus Slama (Austria) Angel Angelov	NOE (Austria) Rudolf Willhalm (Austria) Christian Maerhofer (Austria) Michael Linauer (Austria) Günter Stacher	SCW Wien
2021	Standard	NOE (Austria) Maximilian Huber (Austria) Simon Heiligenbrunner (Austria) Alexander Kastner (Austria) Markus Ebner	STMK (Austria) Hans Georg Koller (Austria) Klaus Gasteiger (Austria) Mark Schröfl (Austria) Adrian Wurm	OOE (Austria) Reinhard Handl (Austria) Manfred Winkler (Austria) Christa Hochholdinger (Austria) Thomas Häupl	SCW Wien
2021	Production Optic	NOE (Austria) Rainer Ulreich (Austria) Martin Meissner (Austria) Christoph Mayrhofer (Austria) Jürgen Gebhardt	WIEN (Austria) Martin Thaler (Austria) Markus Stutterecker (Austria) Jürgen Fischinger (Austria) Peter Veress	OOE (Austria) Stefan Dörsch (Austria) Rupert Klösch (Austria) Martin Hummer (Austria) Jürgen Streber	SCW Wien
2021	PCC	WIEN (Austria) Martin Thaler (Austria) Martin Theilinger (Austria) Mario Kneringer (Austria) Andreas Leizinger	OOE (Austria) Stefan Dörsch (Austria) Manuel Stogmeyer (Austria) Rupert Kloesch (Austria) David Stundner	NOE (Austria) Dieter Scherz (Austria) Günter Stacher (Austria) Markus Pevek (Austria) Marcus Karlin	SSV Vöcklabruck
2022	Standard	WIEN (Austria) Rainer Ulreich (Austria) Mario Kneringer (Austria) Thomas Benesch (Austria) Michael Bücking	NOE (Austria) Bosko Rasovic (Austria) Simon Heiligenbrunner (Austria) Phlipp Dolezal (Austria) Christoph Mayrhofer	OOE (Austria) Reinhard Handl (Austria) Klaus Hörmanseder (Austria) Christoph Reitter (Austria) Thomas Häupl	SGW Leobersdorf
2022	Classic	NOE (Austria) Alexander Kastner (Austria) Maximilian Huber (Austria) Christian Breitler (Austria) Michael Lindenbauer	BGLD (Austria) Otmar Lorenz (Austria) Lukas Kutschi (Austria) Martin Ehn	STMK (Austria) Christoph Fischer (Austria) Dietmar Pfeifer (Austria) Andreas Schaffer	SGW Leobersdorf
2022	Revolver	BGLD (Austria) Gerald Reiter (Austria) Johann Lang (Austria) Andreas Gruber (Austria) Jürgen Schmidt	NOE (Austria) Hermann Kirchweger (Austria) Martin Honeder (Austria) Martin Meissner (Austria) Josef Herbeck	OOE (Austria) Robert Kroiss (Austria) Nikolaus Stelzmüller	SGW Leobersdorf
2023	Mini Rifle	NOE (Austria) Martin Theilinger (Austria) Günter Stacher (Austria) Marcus Karlin (Austria) Markus Pevek	WIEN (Austria) Martin Thaler (Austria) Markus Benes (Austria) Thomas Benesch (Austria) Mario Kneringer	NOE SEN. (Austria) Dieter Scherz (Austria) Edgar Praschinger (Austria) Robert Ladisich (Austria) Peter Birner	SCW Wien
2023	Production	NOE (Austria) Simon Heiligenbrunner (Austria) Rainer Ulreich (Austria) Bosko Rasovic (Austria) Philipp Dolezal	OOE (Austria) Andreas Oriol (Austria) Reinhard Handl (Austria) Manfred Winkler (Austria) Martin Hummer	STMK (Austria) Thomas Hasenbacher (Austria) Patrick Stremitzer (Austria) Rosenauer Christian	SSV Vöcklabruck
2023	Classic	NOE (Austria) Alexander Kastner (Austria) Markus Ebner (Austria) Maximilian Huber (Austria) Christian Breitler	WIEN (Austria) Thomas Benesch (Austria) Markus Stutterecker (Austria) Daniel Polt	SBG (Austria) Thiemo Altenreiter (Austria) Robert Hasenkopf (Austria) Markus Helminger	SSV Vöcklabruck
2023	Revolver	BGLD (Austria) Gerald Reiter (Austria) Johann Lang (Austria) Andreas Gruber (Austria) Jürgen Schmidt	OOE (Austria) Robert Kroiss (Austria) Nikolaus Stelzmüller (Austria) Richard Schaubmair (Austria) Franz Mayr	NOE (Austria) Hermann Kirchweger (Austria) Martin Honeder (Austria) Martin Meissner (Austria) Werner Feyertag	SSV Vöcklabruck
