= Austrian Association for Practical Shooting =

Austrian shooting association

- Österreichische Vereinigung für Praktisches Schiessen
- Regional Director: Mario Kneringer
- 1st Representative: Kurt Kreuzer
- Parent organization: International Practical Shooting Confederation
- Website: ipscaustria.at

The Austrian Association for Practical Shooting, German Österreichische Vereinigung für Praktisches Schiessen is the Austrian association for practical shooting under the International Practical Shooting Confederation.

== See also ==
- IPSC Austrian Handgun Championship
