= Felsőtárkány =

- Flag Coat of arms

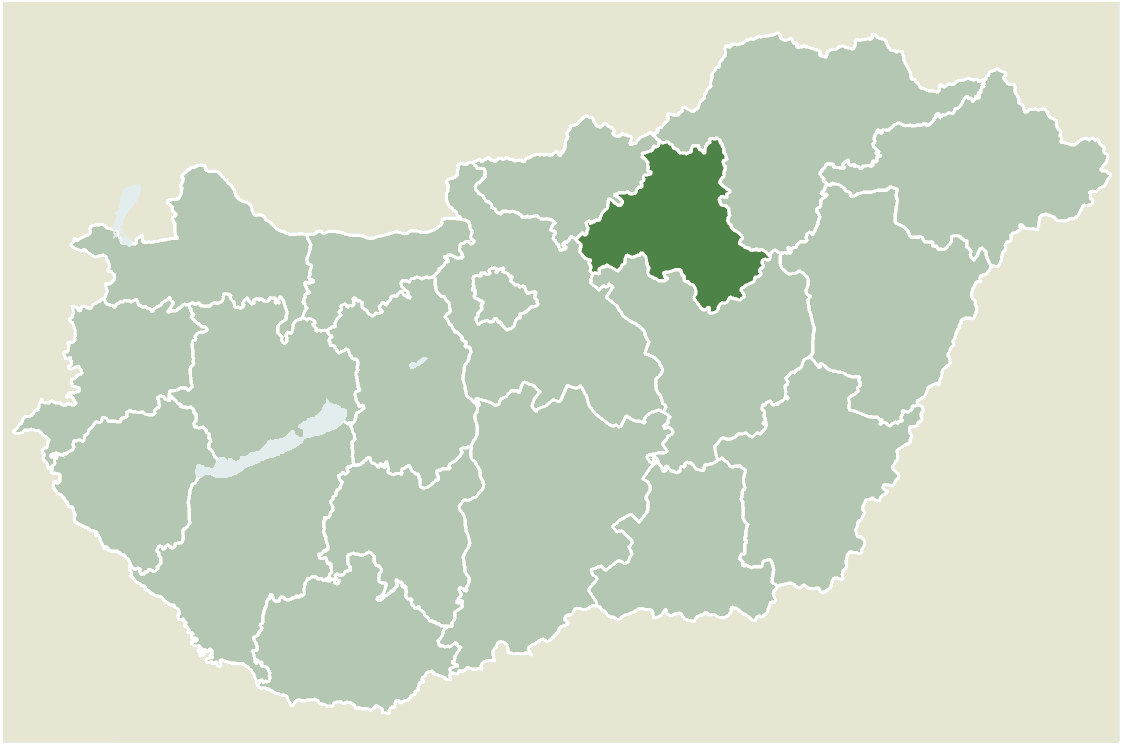
- Location of Heves county in Hungary

- Location of Felsőtárkány
- Coordinates: 47.973°N 20.416°E
- Country: Hungary
- County: Heves (county)

Area
  - Total: 77.32 km^{2} (29.85 sq mi)

Population (2014)
  - Total: 3,509
  - Density: 44.67/km^{2} (115.7/sq mi)
- Time zone: UTC+1 (CET)
  - Summer (DST): UTC+2 (CEST)
- Postal code: 3324
- Area code: 36
- Website: felsotarkany.hu

Felsőtárkány is a municipality in the Eger District of Heves county, Hungary.

== Geography ==
The municipality lies in the Tárkány basin, at the foothills of the Bükk Mountains, on an area of 7,734.6 hectares, 6 km northeast from Eger in Heves county.

== History ==
=== Middle ages ===
The history of Felsőtárkány goes back to the 13th century with the first descriptive mention in the form of Oltarkan and Feltarlam in a document from 1261. During the 14th-15th century the settlement was made up of two parts, Alsó- and Felsőtárkány (Lower- and Upper-Tárkány)

Between 1330 and 1335, Carthusians monks settled in the monastery built in Felsőtárkány. During the Ottoman invasion the medieval Felsőtárkány was destroyed in 1526, and was never populated again. Alsótárkány was also destroyed in 1552, but it was repopulated in 1577.

In the Middle Ages, Feltarkan belonged to Eger bishopric according to the possession confirmation certificate from 1261. The medieval Felsőtárkány was situated around the castle garden, north form today's settlement. On this site, Miklós II, the bishop of Eger ordered the building of a monastery for the Carthusian monks, which was built between 1330 and 1350. During the Ottoman attacks the monastery was also destroyed with the settlement, and is in ruins since 1552.

=== Early modern times ===
Already as a "serf village" in 1694 the name was finally changed to Felsőtárkány. In 1750 Archbishop Barkóczy built the Castle Fourcontrasti, and a monastery for the Nazarenes. The remains of the monastery can be still seen on the north of the settlement. The population of Felsőtárkán was changing rapidly, from 862 in 1786 to 1440 in 1869.

=== Postwar era ===
On 10 December 1944 the Second World War ended for the residents of the municipality.

In 1950, with the number of 17 members, the "Dózsa" agricultural cooperative was formed. The number of the members started to increased after 1960, and the territory of the cooperative reached the 1,000 hectares.

== Politics ==
=== Coat of arms ===
The Coat of Arms of Felsőtárkány is divided into four sections, and framed with gold. On the top left is a brown head of a stag, symbolizing hunting and game-breeding. On the top right, a special and rare wild flower can be seen, called Boldogasszony papucsa (lady's-slipper orchid), a species unique to Hungary. The bottom of the shield is divided in two, as white and blue parts with opposite-coloured waves representing Brook Tárkány and Brook Imókő, flowing through the village symbolically.

=== Twin towns — Sister cities ===
Felsőtárkány is twinned with:

City	State/Region	Country
Dickenschied	Rhineland-Palatinate	Germany
Tărcaia	Bihor	Romania
Veľké Trakany	Košice Region	Slovakia
Malé Trakany	Košice Region	Slovakia
Mezőtárkány	Heves	Hungary
Tárkány	Komárom-Esztergom	Hungary

== Culture and sightseeing ==
- Felsőtárkány National Forest Railway

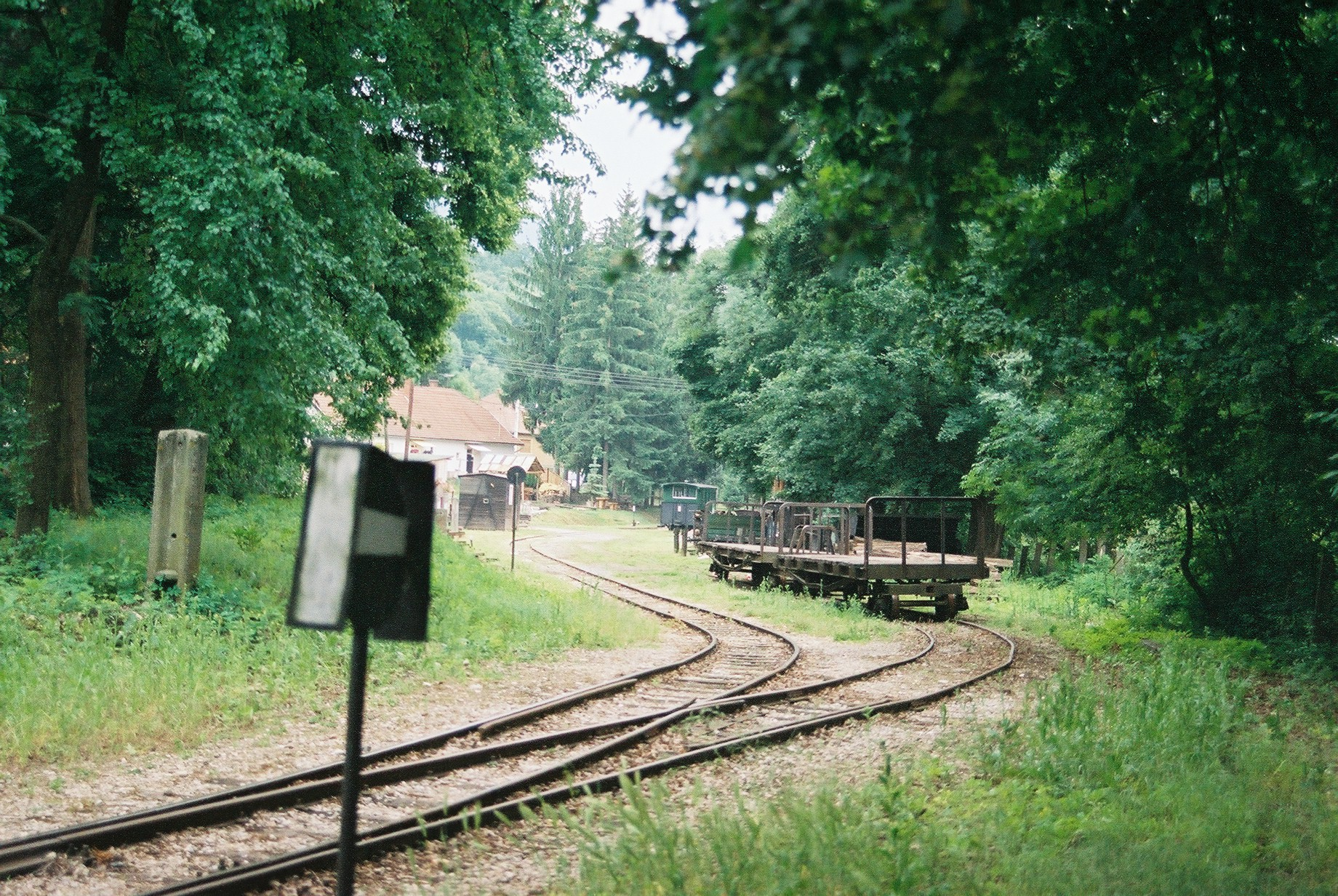
Felsőtárkány National Forest Railway

- Reformed Church Kálvin János

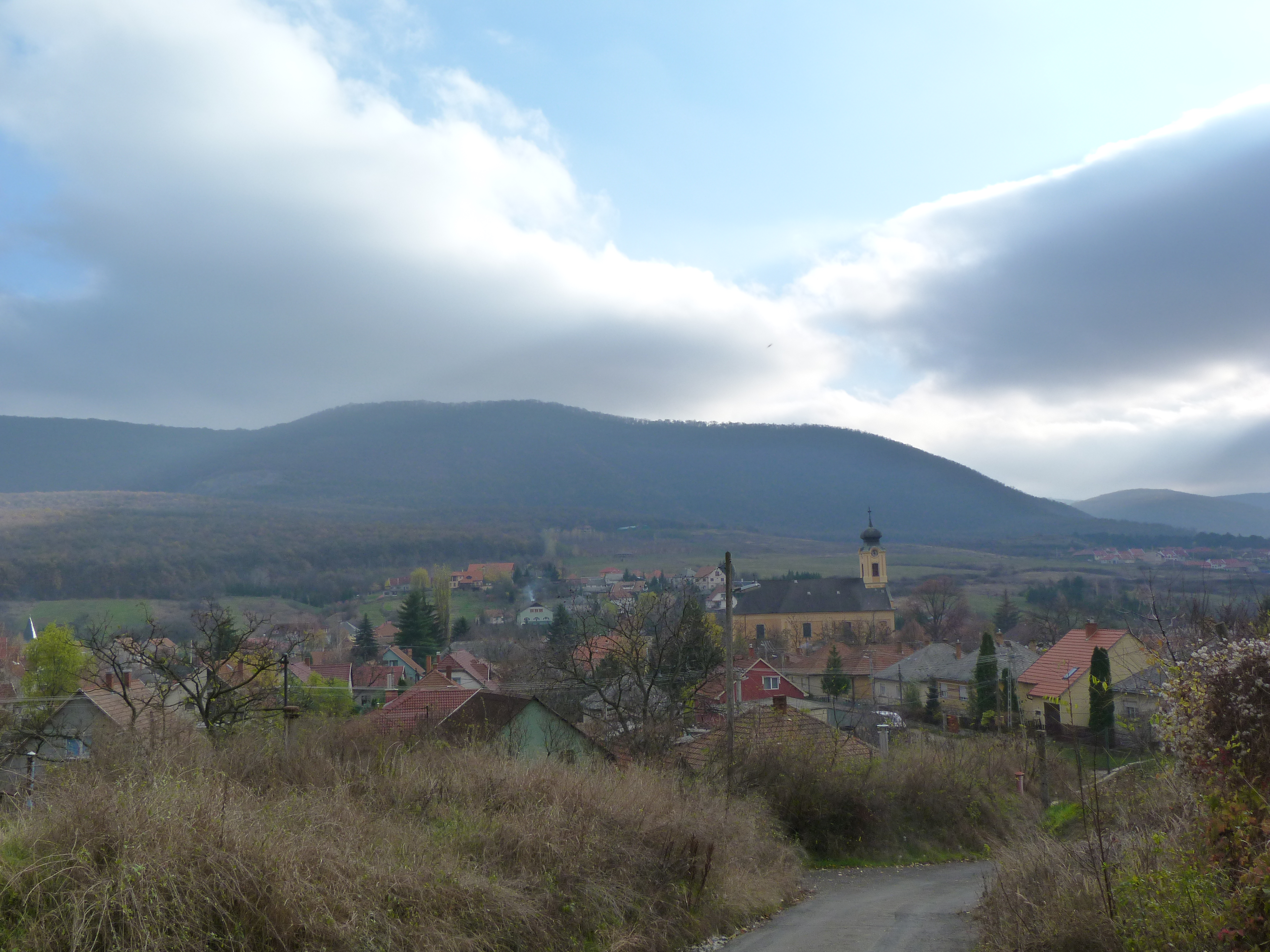
Felsőtárkány and its Catholic Church

- Catholic Church Bűnbánó Szent Mária Magdolna (Penitent St Mary Magdalene)

The late Baroque style historic building, ordered by bishop Károly Eszterházy, was built between 1785 and 1790 by József Francz master mason from Eger. The altars by Giacomo and Giovanni Adami, were finished by 1793, while the statues were done by József Mozer stonemason. The patron of the church is Penitent St Mary Magdalene.

== Sports ==
- Felsőtárkány SC, association football club
