= Felsőtárkány National Forest Railway =

Rail line in Northern Hungary

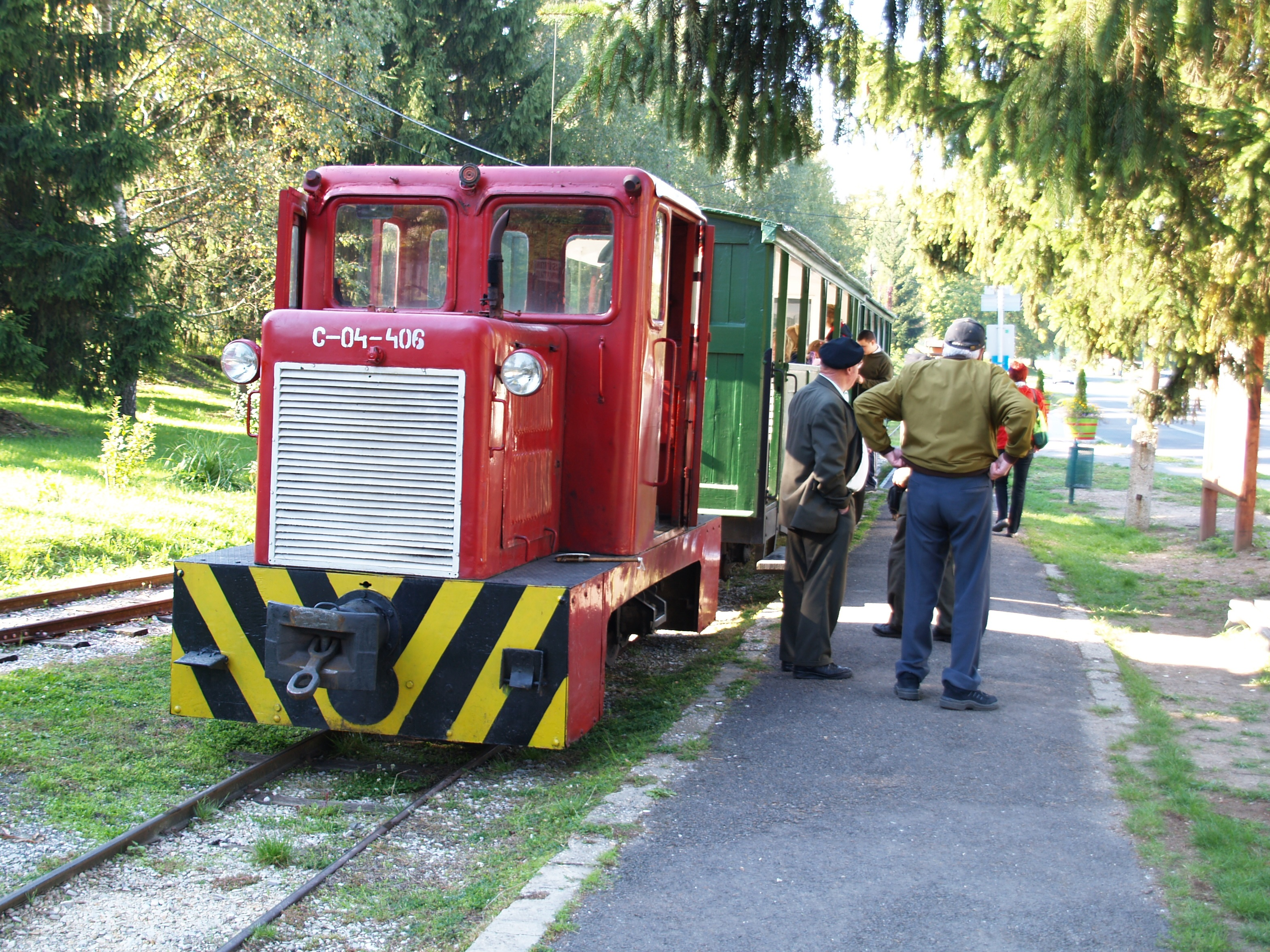

Overview
- Native name: Felsőtárkányi Állami Erdei Vasút
- Locale: Hungary
- Coordinates: 47°58′47″N 20°25′55″E
- Stations: 4

History
- Opened: 1915

Technical
- Line length: 4.8 km (3 miles)
- Track gauge: 760 mm (2 ft 5 15/16 in) Bosnian gauge
- Operating speed: 10 km/h

Felsőtárkány National Forest Railway (Hungarian: Felsőtárkányi Állami Erdei Vasút) is a 5 kilometers long railway line in Northern Hungary. It operates regularly between 1 May and 30 September. It was built in 1915.

== Stations ==
- Village of Felsőtárkány
- Egres Valley (Varróház)
- Stimecz-ház Tourist House and Field School

== Sights around ==
- Vöröskő spring
- A 1,5 km long hiking trail with 21 stops.
- Lake of Felsőtárkány
- Museum of Bükk
