= Opařany =

- Municipality
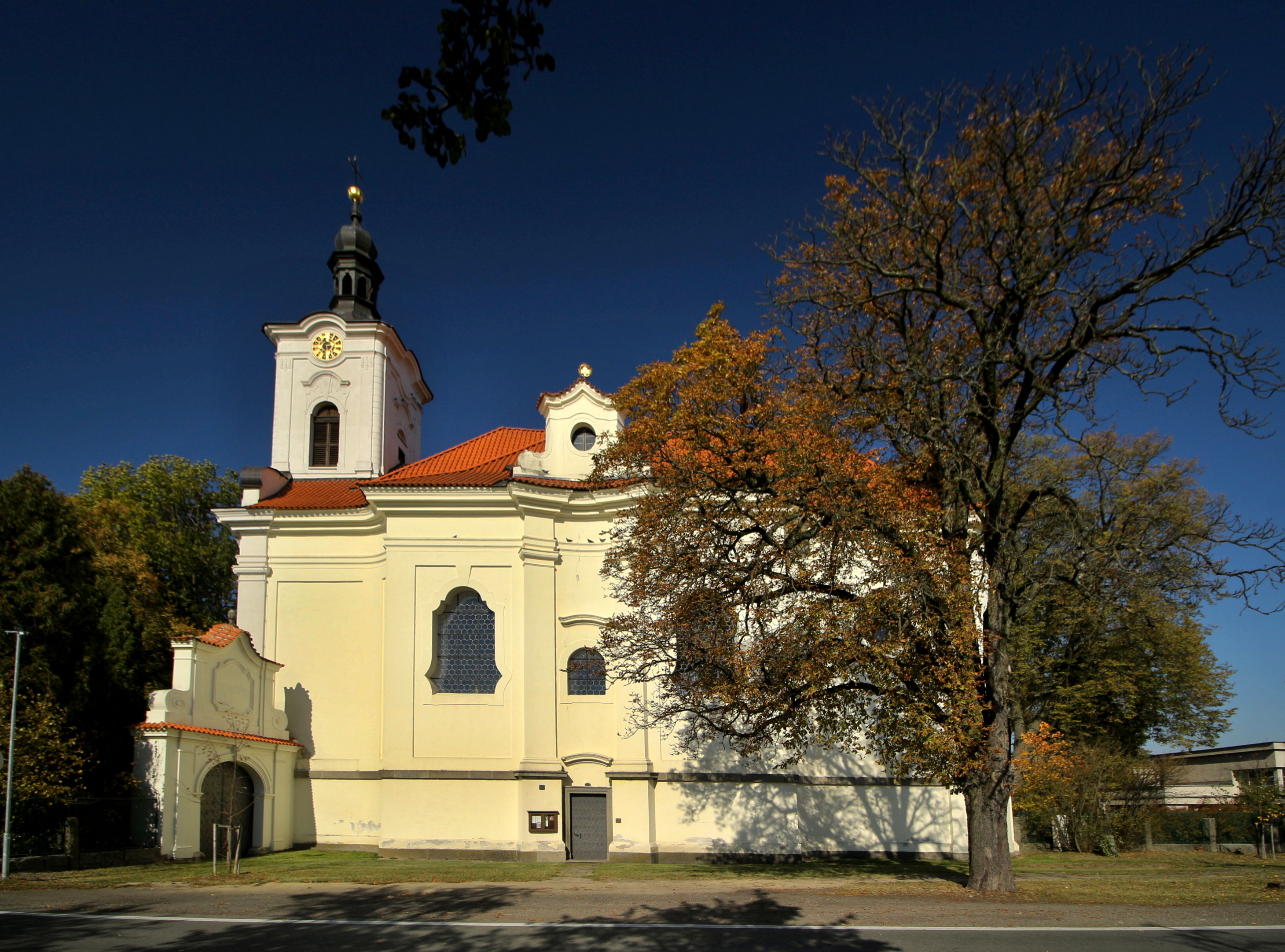
- Church of Saint Francis Xavier

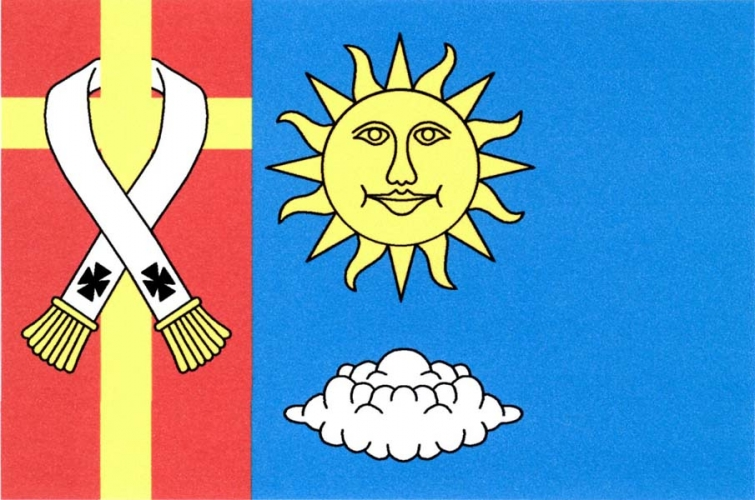
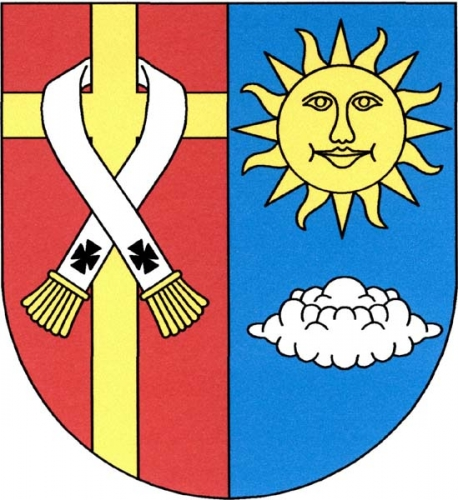
- Flag Coat of arms

- Location in the Czech Republic
- Coordinates: 49°23′49″N 14°28′53″E
- Country: Czech Republic
- Region: South Bohemian
- District: Tábor
- First mentioned: 1268

Area
  - Total: 31.48 km^{2} (12.15 sq mi)
- Elevation: 464 m (1,522 ft)

Population (2026-01-01)
  - Total: 1,420
  - Density: 45.1/km^{2} (117/sq mi)
- Time zone: UTC+1 (CET)
  - Summer (DST): UTC+2 (CEST)
- Postal code: 391 61
- Website: www.oparany.cz

Opařany (German: Woporschan) is a municipality and village in Tábor District in the South Bohemian Region of the Czech Republic. It has about 1,400 inhabitants.

== Administrative division ==
Opařany consists of seven municipal parts (in brackets population according to the 2021 census):

- Opařany (851)
- Hodušín (20)
- Nové Dvory (62)
- Olší (81)
- Oltyně (72)
- Podboří (111)
- Skrýchov u Opařan (119)

== Etymology ==
The name Opařany is derived from the words opar (in Old Czechi t was a word for a place where the sun burns a lot) and opařan (a person living in opar). So Opařany was the village of people living in a place hot from the sun.

== Geography ==
Opařany is located about 13 kilometres (8 mi) west of Tábor and 69 km (43 mi) south of Prague. It lies in the Tábor Uplands. The highest point is the hill Velká hora at 520 m (1,710 ft) above sea level. The Smutná River flows along the western municipal border. There are several fishponds in the municipal territory, the largest of which is Oltyňský rybník, built on the stream Oltyňský potok.

== History ==
The first written mention of Opařany is from 1268, when King Ottokar II of Bohemia bought Opařany together with the brewery. From 1437 to 1547, it was property of the town of Tábor. The Thirty Years' War affected the village, the population declined and the buildings fell into disrepair.

In the early 18th century, the Jesuits acquired Opařany. After canceling the Jesuit Order in 1773, their properties were acquired by a study fund, and in 1825 the estate was gained by the Paar noble family.

== Demographics ==
Historical population

Year	Pop.	±%
1869	2,400	—
1880	2,289	−4.6%
1890	2,640	+15.3%
1900	2,792	+5.8%
1910	2,730	−2.2%

Year	Pop.	±%
1921	2,465	−9.7%
1930	2,529	+2.6%
1950	2,196	−13.2%
1961	1,660	−24.4%
1970	1,520	−8.4%

Year	Pop.	±%
1980	1,479	−2.7%
1991	1,411	−4.6%
2001	1,390	−1.5%
2011	1,384	−0.4%
2021	1,316	−4.9%

Source: Censuses

== Transport ==
The I/19 road (the section from Plzeň to Tábor runs through the municipal territory. The I/29 road splits from it in Oltyně and continues to Písek via the village of Opařany.

== Sport ==
In Opařany is annually held motorcycle cross country race called Enduro.

== Sights ==
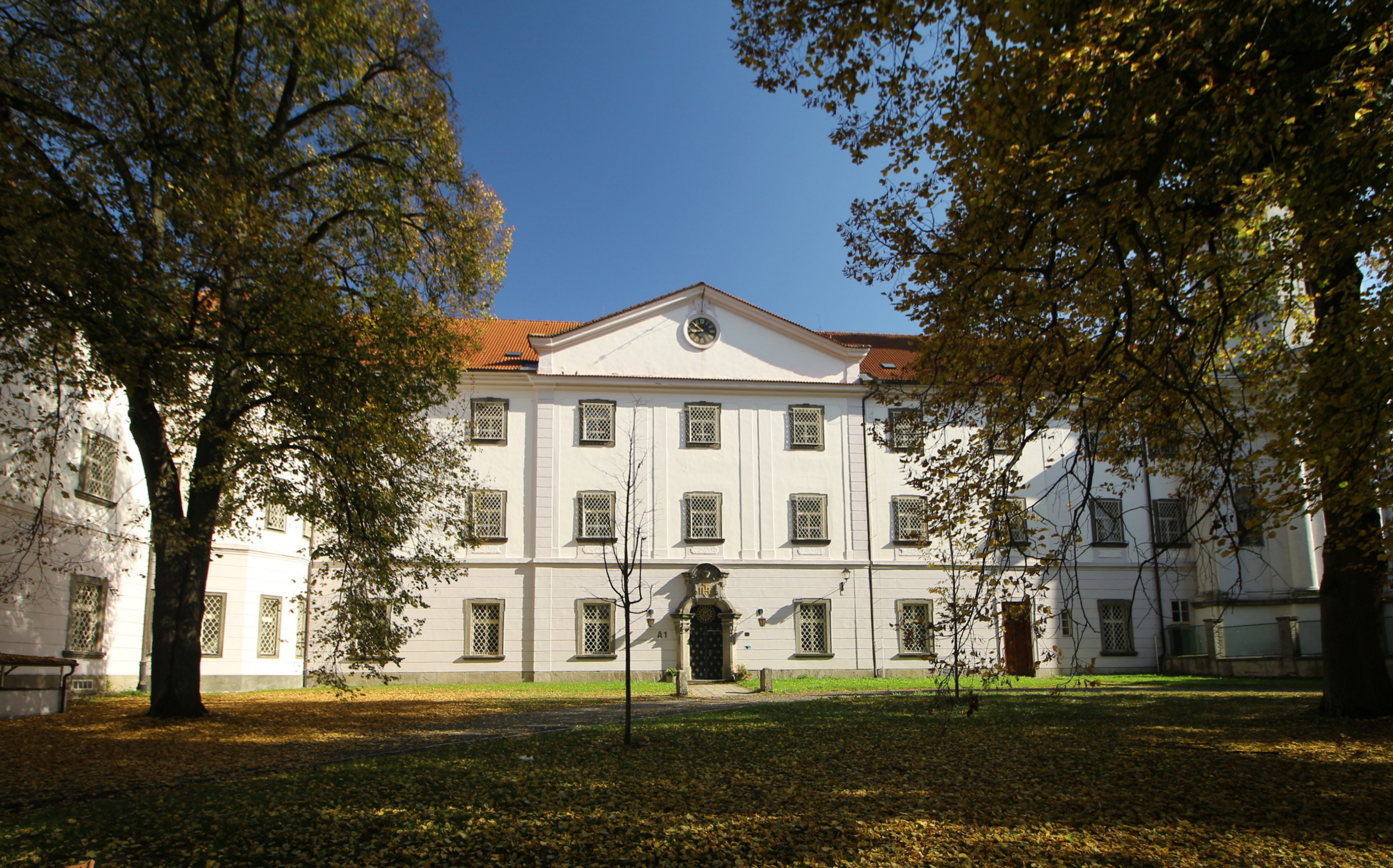
Opařany Castle

In 1727, the Jesuits built a Baroque residence with the Church of Saint Francis Xavier as a resemblance to the church in Prague Clementinum. Its interior belongs to one of the most interesting work of art in central Europe. As an author of the project of the church was authorised Kilian Ignaz Dientzenhofer. Since 1923, the building of Opařany Castle has served as a children psychiatric hospital.

In Oltyně part of Opařany there is the Oltyně Castle. It was built in the Neo-Renaissance style in 1859 on the site of an old fortress. Its part is a 8 hectares (20 acres) large English park.

== Notable people ==
- Marie Dušková (1903–1968), poet
