= List of Bianchi Cup champions =

Bianchi Cup
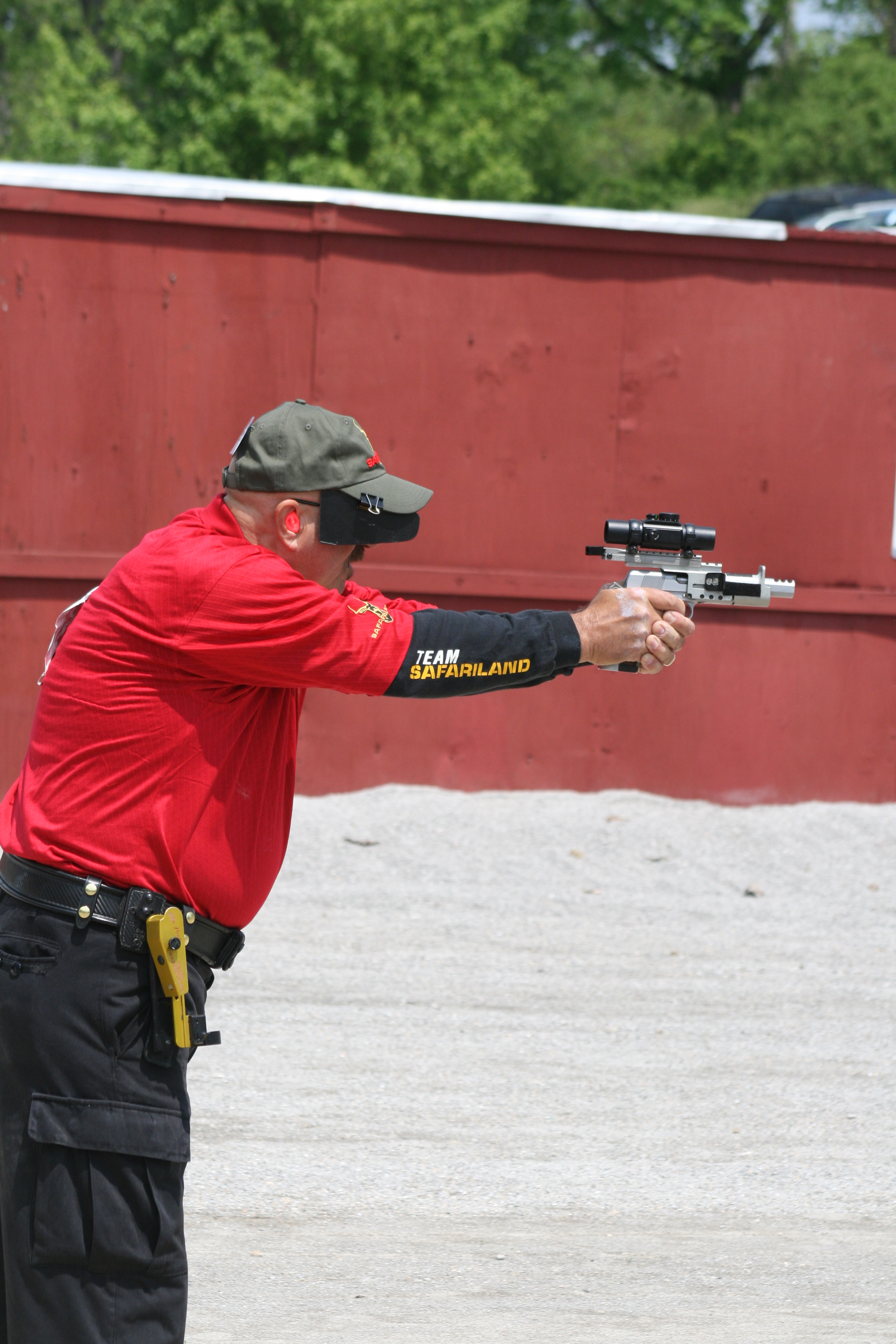
- Competitor at the 2008 NRA Bianchi Cup

Tournament information
- Sport: Action Pistol
- Established: 1979
- Administrator: National Rifle Association of America
- Tournament format(s): Multi-day, multi-stage Tournament
- Venue: Green Valley Rifle & Pistol Club
- Purse: $500,000 (2014)

The NRA Bianchi Cup is the National Action Pistol Championship, an event in Action Shooting. The 2014 prize fund was valued at $500,000 in cash and prizes.

== Match History ==
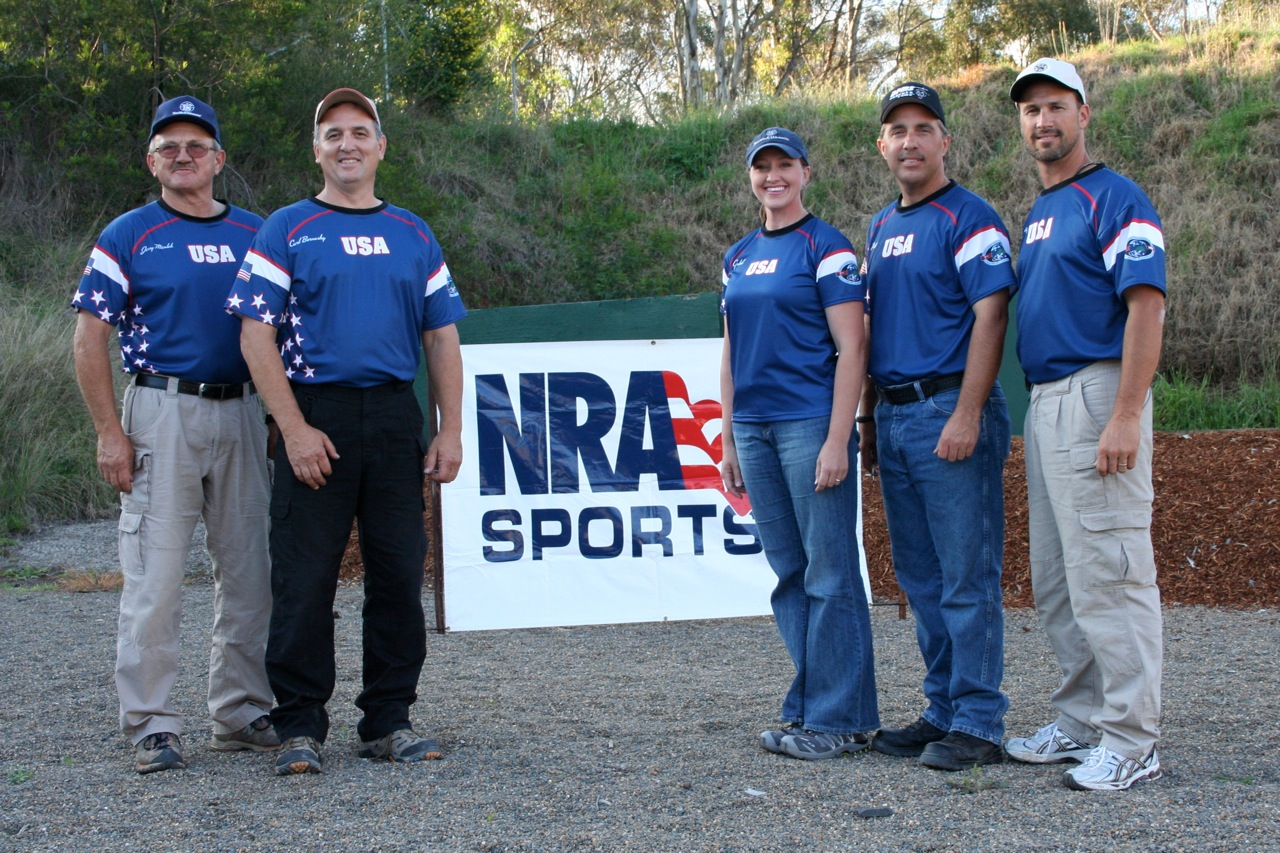
Several former Bianchi Cup champions at the 2010 World Action Pistol Championship in Australia. (L-R) Jerry Miculek, Carl Bernosky, Julie Goloski-Golob, Bruce Piatt, and 2010 NRA Bianchi Cup Champion and World Action Pistol Champion Doug Koenig.

The Bianchi Cup was created in 1979 by John Bianchi, Bianchi International, and awarded to the winner of the Bianchi Cup International Pistol Tournament. The National Rifle Association of America designated the Bianchi Cup as the "National Action Pistol Championship" in 1984 and assumed operational control of the tournament the next year. Bianchi International presented the Bianchi Cup to the NRA in 1985. The Cup is awarded annually to the National Action Pistol Champion.

Match Conditions

1979: An aggregate of 192 shots fired in four 48 shot matches: The Practical Event, The Barricade Event, The Falling Plate Event and the Moving Target Event (modified). Possible score of 1920-192X.

1985: An aggregate of 204 shots consisting of three 48 shot matches (The Barricade Event, The Falling Plate Event, The Moving Target Event (mod.) plus a 60 shot International Rapid Fire Event. Possible score 2040-204X.

1986: Returned to the conditions of 1979.

^{[a]}

== Key ==
^	Tournament winner
†	denotes high score
*	first perfect score fired

== NRA Action Pistol Bianchi Cup Champions ==
Year	Country	Champion	Score	Gun	Runner up	Score	Notes
1979	USA	Ron Lerch	1816-062x	Colt 1911	Mickey Fowler	1799-071x	
1980	USA	Mickey Fowler	1879-085x	Colt 1911	David Bates	1851-047x	
1981	USA	Mickey Fowler	1890-088x	Colt 1911	Mark Duncan	1882-083x	
1982	USA	Mickey Fowler	1903-145x	Colt 1911	Brian Enos	1902-168x	
1983	USA	Brian Enos	1903-612x	S&W Model 10	John Pride	1902-407x	
1984	USA	Brian Enos	1910-257x	S&W Model 10	John Shaw	1910-214x	
1985	USA	Rob Leatham	2034-155x	S&W Model 10	Tom Campbell	2019-135x	
1986	USA	W. Riley Gilmore	1916-144x	S&W Model 15	Tom Campbell	1914-144x	
1987	USA	John Pride	1912-151x	S&W Model 686	John Shaw	1912-147x	
1988	USA	John Pride	1918-163x	S&W Model 686	Brian Enos	1916-149x	
1989	USA	Lemoine Wright	1914-152x	S&W Model 586	Gib Niswander	1914-145x	
1990	USA	Doug Koenig *	1920-157x	S&W Model 10	Mario DiPaolo	1918-158x	
1991	USA	W. Riley Gilmore	1920-166x	S&W Model 10	Curtis Shipley	1918-172x	
1992	USA	Doug Koenig	1920-169x	?	Mario DiPaolo	1918-172x	
1993	USA	Bruce Piatt	1920-170x	Caspian 1911			
1993	AUS	Brian Kilpatrick ^	1920-173x	S&W Revolver			
1994	USA	John Pride	1920-174x	?	Mickey Fowler	1920-174x	
1995	USA	John Pride	1920-179x	?	Bruce Piatt	1920-168x	
1996	USA	Mickey Fowler	1918-184x	?			
1996	AUS	Ross G. Newell ^	1920-163x	?			
1997	USA	Bruce Piatt	1920-181x	Caspian 1911	Mickey Fowler	1920-176x	
1998	USA	Doug Koenig	1920-180x	?	Ken Tapp	1920-173x	
1999	USA	Bruce Piatt †	1920-185x	Caspian 1911			
2000	USA	Doug Koenig †	1920-185x	?	Bruce Piatt	1920-175x	
2001	USA	Doug Koenig	1920-184x	?	Bruce Piatt	1920-180x	
2002	USA	Doug Koenig	1920-184x	?	Michael Voigt	1920-174x	
2003	USA	Doug Koenig	1920-183x	?	Bruce Piatt	1920-183x	
2004	USA	Doug Koenig	1920-177x	?	Bruce Piatt	1920-181x	
2005	USA	Doug Koenig †	1920-185x	?	Bruce Piatt	1920-179x	
2006	USA	Bruce Piatt	1920-177x	Caspian 1911	Doug Koenig	1920-174x	
2007	USA	Doug Koenig †	1920-185x	?	Bruce Piatt	1920-183x	
2008	USA	Doug Koenig	1918-185x	?	Bruce Piatt	1918-182x	
2009	USA	Bruce Piatt	1920-181x	Caspian 1911	Doug Koenig	1920-177x	
2010	USA	Doug Koenig	1920-179x	?	Bruce Piatt	1918-183x	
2011	USA	Doug Koenig	1920-187x	?	Bruce Piatt	1920-177x	
2012	USA	Doug Koenig	1920-182x		Richard Siebert	1920-159	
2013	USA	Doug Koenig	1920-183x		Carl Bernosky	1920-178	
2014	USA	Kevin Angstadt	1920-171x		Doug Koenig	1918-182x	
2015	USA	Doug Koenig	1920-180x	S&W 1911	Jeremy Newell	1920-166x	
2016	USA	Doug Koenig	1920-183x	S&W 1911	Kyle Schmidt	1920-164x	
2017	USA	Doug Koenig	1920-184x	S&W 1911	Bruce Piatt	1920-181x	
2018	USA	Adam Sokolowski	1920-176x		Doug Koenig & Mark Blake (tied)	1920-172x	
2019	USA	Bruce Piatt	1920-179x	Caspian 1911	Adam Sokolowski	1920-178x	
2020	(Cancelled)						
2021	USA	Doug Koenig	1920-182x		Bruce Piatt	1920-176x	
2022	USA	Benito Martinez	1920-165x		Joey DeLeon	1920-153x	
2023	USA	Bruce Piatt	1920-178x		Mark Blake	1920-178x	
2024	USA	Doug Koenig	1920-183x		Bruce Piatt	1920-181x	

== NRA Action Pistol Metallic Division Champions ==
The Metallic Division was instituted with the 1998 Bianchi Cup.

Year	Country	Champion	Score
1998	USA	Chad Dietrich	1905-125x
1999	USA	Fred Craig	1863-127x
2000	USA	Rob Leatham	1897-145x
2001	USA	Vance Schmid	1896-130x
2002	USA	Rob Leatham	1884-136x
2003	USA	Frederick Craig	1886-128x
2004	USA	Rob Leatham	1905-144x
2005	USA	Rob Leatham †	1910-153x
2006	USA	Rob Leatham	1902-145x
2007	USA	Rob Leatham	1902-153x
2008	USA	Rob Vadasz	1902-138x
2009	USA	Rob Leatham	1909-145x
2010	USA	Rob Vadasz	1904-146x
2011	USA	Rob Vadasz	1908-143x
2012	USA	Rob Vadasz	1878-135x
2013	USA	Rob Vadasz	1892-132x
2014	USA	Kevin Worrell	1907-127x
2015	USA	Patrick Franks	1902-140x
2016	USA	Patrick Franks	1901-140x
2017	USA	Adam Sokolowski †	1920-143x
2018	USA	Rob Vadasz	1912-155x
2019	USA	Kyle Schmidt	1905-137x
2020	(Cancelled)		
2021	USA	Rob Vadasz	1918-154x
2022	USA	Ryan Franks	1914-156x
2023	USA	Ryan Franks	1914-141x
2024	USA	Ryan Franks	1916-163x

== NRA Action Pistol Women's Division Champions ==
The Women's Division was instituted with the 1980 Bianchi Cup.

Year	Country	Champion	Score
1980	RSA	Edith Almeida	1821-073x
1981	RSA	Edith Almeida	1652-045x
1982	RSA	Edith Almeida	1304-077x
1983	USA	Sally Van Valzah	1765-091x
1984	USA	Lee Cole	1761-096x
1985	USA	Lee Cole	1957-119x
1986	USA	Christie Rogers	1759-096x
1987	CAN	Lorna Pavelka	1787-088x
1988	USA	Christie Rogers	1836-111x
1989	JPN	Yoko Shimomura	1882-129x
1990	USA	Christie Rogers	1885-124x
1991	AUS	Janina Tenace	1888-134x
1992	CAN	Lorna Pavelka	1899-142x
1993	USA	Judy Woolley	1898-148x
1994	USA	Judy Woolley	1906-148x
1995	AUS	Dewi Hazeltine	1908-150x
1996	USA	Sharon Edington	1899-140x
1997	USA	Sharon Edington	1906-142x
1998	AUS	Anita Mackiewicz †	1914-148x
1999	USA	Vera Koo	1894-137x
2000	AUS	Robyn Estreich	1902-157x
2001	USA	Vera Koo †	1910-137x
2002	USA	Vera Koo	1905-151x
2003	USA	Vera Koo	1894-141x
2004	USA	Vera Koo	1886-136x
2005	USA	Vera Koo	1894-149x
2006	USA	Vera Koo	1897-143x
2007	USA	Julie Goloski	1903-139x
2008	USA	Vera Koo	1870-136x
2009	USA	Julie Goloski Golob	1907-138x
2010	USA	Jessie Harrison	1906-163x
2011	USA	Jessie Harrison	1912-153x
2012	USA	Julie Golob	1907-144x
2013	USA	Jessie Duff	1893-142x
2014	USA	Jessie Duff	1893-135x
2015	AUS	Anita Mackiewicz †	1916-166x
2016	NZ	Tiffany Piper	1904-154x
2017	AUS	Cherie Blake	1904-145x
2018	AUS	Anita Mackiewicz	1911-153x
2019	AUS	Cherie Blake	1904-145x
2020	(Cancelled)		
2021	USA	Becky Yackley	1908-139x
2022	USA	Sally Talbot	1913-155x
2023	USA	Sally Talbot	1889-152x
2024	AUS	Cherie Blake	1910-150x
