= 1993 IPSC Handgun World Shoot =

International shooting tournament

1993 IPSC Handgun World Shoot X
- Official logo of the 1993 IPSC Handgun World Shoot
- Venue: National Shooting Centre at Bisley
- Location: Bisley, Surrey, England
- Dates: 12. to 18. September 1993
- Competitors: 550

Medalists
| gold medal | Open (Largest Division) (United States) Matthew McLearn |
| silver medal | (United States) Doug Koenig |
| bronze medal | (United States) Michael Voigt |

The 1993 IPSC Handgun World Shoot X held in Bisley, England was the 10th IPSC Handgun World Shoot, and consisted of 5 days with 34 stages, teams from over 27 countries and much rain. The competition had been divided into the Open, Standard and Modified divisions. The Standard division was won by Ted Bonnet of United States, the Modified division by Robert Buntschu of Switzerland and the Open division by Matthew McLearn of United States. Born in Nova Scotia, Mclearn had moved to the U.S. five years prior the world championship to pursue gunsmithing training and advance in the competitive arena. Right before winning the World Shoot he also placed first in the U.S. IPSC Handgun Nationals.

== Champions ==
=== Open ===
Individual

| Overall | Competitor | Points | Overall Match Percent | |
|---|---|---|---|---|
| Gold | (United States) Matthew McLearn | 2146.9769 | 100.00% | |
| Silver | (United States) Doug Koenig | 2133.0770 | 99.35% | |
| Bronze | (United States) Michael Voigt | 2122.9266 | 98.88% | |
| 4th | (United States) Jerry Barnhart | 2087.0933 | 97.21% | |
| 5th | (United States) Rob Leatham | 2084.2136 | 97.08% | |
| 6th | (United States) Todd Jarrett | 2052.2724 | 95.59% | |
| 7th | (Philippines) Jethro Dionisio | 2043.8240 | 95.20% | |
| 8th | (Australia) Craig Ginger | 1988.3024 | 92.61% | |
| 9th | (United States) Matt Burkett | 1974.5426 | 91.97% | |
| 10th | (United States) Merle Edington | 1969.5745 | 91.74% | |
| Lady | Competitor | Points | Overall percent | Category percent |
| Gold | (United States) Kay Clark Miculek | 1674.5832 | 78.00% | 100.00% |
| Silver | (United Kingdom) Collette Barnes | 1629.2796 | 75.89% | 97.29% |
| Bronze | (United States) Kippi Boykin | 1592.8513 | 74.19% | 95.12% |

Teams

| OVerall | Country | Points | Percent | Team members |
|---|---|---|---|---|
| Gold | United States | 10574.2874 | 100.00% | Matthew McLearn, Doug Koenig, Michael Voigt, Jerry Barnhart, Rob Leatham and Todd Jarrett |
| Silver | South Africa | 9420.5502 | 89.09% | Warren Richards, Clint Rafferty, Gary Haltmann, Eddie Smith, Nicolaas du Plessis and Colin Amm |
| Bronze | Great Britain | 9261.8333 | 87.59% | Dean Notley, Angus Hobdell, Andy Haines, Graham Lucas, Robert Dunkley and Jeremy White |
| 4th | Australia | 9059.3783 | 85.67% | Craig Ginger, Ken Carter, Andrew Moss, Ed Danko, Ivan Rehlicki and Errol Thomas |
| 5th | Philippines | 9052.3533 | 85.61% | Jethro Dionisio, Christopher Lacson, Eric Ang, Patrick Sanchez, Jomini Abaya and Raymund Locsin |
| 6th | Switzerland | 8988.8986 | 85.01% | Armin Landolt, Josef Hofstetter, Hubert Burch, Miro Mazzuchelli, Peter Kressibucher and Francois Gendre |
| 7th | Canada | 8776.2741 | 83.00% | Steven Johns, Don Brush, Brad Hertz, Darrell Wilks, Murray Gardner and James Armour |
| 8th | Sweden | 8575.1036 | 81.09% | Johan Hansen, Dan Liljeström, Tage Åström, Björn Smedman, Göran Wallström and Rolf Lönn |
| 9th | Italy | 8515.5460 | 80.53% | Oswald Gerstl, Carlo Zanini, Adalberto Toia, Gavino Mura, Andrea Gavazzeni and Fabio Giori |
| 10th | Finland | 8358.8035 | 79.05% | Timo Hietala, Harri Pesonen, Olavi Vahakallio, Jari Niklander, Mikael Dahl and Juha Makela |
| Lady | Country | Points | Percent | Team members |
| Gold | United States | 4738.5045 | 100.00% | Kay Clark-Miculek, Kippi Boykin, Shirley Hamilton, Betty Jo Ratliff |
| Silver | United Kingdom | 4468.4663 | 94.30% | Colette Barnes, Elaine Berwick, Bridget Reddington, Tracy Speirs |
| Bronze | South Africa | 4362.2514 | 92.06% | Ursula Lund, Shereen Boomgaard, Chantal Accone, Sebella Steyn |

=== Modified ===
Individual

| Overall | Competitor | Points | Overall Match Percent |
|---|---|---|---|
| Gold | (Switzerland) Robert Buntschu | 1523.1289 | 100.00% |
| Silver | (United Kingdom) Richard Bhella | 1371.0741 | 90.02% |
| Bronze | (United States) Kerby Smith | 1296.6703 | 85.13% |
| 4th | (France) Marc Schmitt | 1188.9224 | 78.06% |
| 5th | (United Kingdom) Danny Hayes | 1187.4659 | 77.96% |
| 6th | (Germany) Michael Schreiner | 1076.4325 | 70.67% |
| 7th | (United Kingdom) Steven Allery | 1060.9006 | 69.65% |
| 8th | (France) Francois Haut | 933.6727 | 61.30% |
| 9th | (Thailand) Bruce Kekule | 913.7220 | 59.99% |
| 10th | (Belgium) Jean-Pierre Denis | 908.3875 | 59.64% |

=== Standard ===
Individual

| Overall | Competitor | Points | Overall Match Percent |
|---|---|---|---|
| Gold | (United States) Ted Bonnet | 1742.3171 | 100.00% |
| Silver | (United States) Brian Enos | 1683.0342 | 96.60% |
| Bronze | (Germany) Max Wiegand | 1582.7631 | 90.84% |
| 4th | (United States) Robert Gates | 1536.0705 | 88.16% |
| 5th | (United Kingdom) Robert Adam | 1503.8276 | 86.31% |
| 6th | (Norway) Vidar Nakling | 1457.6094 | 83.66% |
| 7th | (United States) John Weigand | 1446.9825 | 83.05% |
| 8th | (United States) David Elrod | 1441.5818 | 82.74% |
| 9th | (Italy) Edoardo Buticchi | 1427.6899 | 81.94% |
| 10th | (United Kingdom) Frank Loweth | 1426.5257 | 81.88% |

== See also ==
- IPSC Rifle World Shoots
- IPSC Shotgun World Shoot
- IPSC Action Air World Shoot
