= 1990 IPSC Handgun World Shoot =

International shooting tournament

1990 IPSC Handgun World Shoot IV
- Location: Adelaide, Australia

Medalists
gold medal	(United States) Doug Koenig
silver medal	(United States) Jerry Barnhart
bronze medal	(United States) Rob Leatham

The 1990 IPSC Handgun World Shoot IV held in Adelaide, Australia was the 9th IPSC Handgun World Shoot, and was won by Doug Koenig of USA, the first competitor using a red dot sight at a World Shoot. Having been interested in shooting since being eleven years old, Koenig had been spotted at a local shooting club for his good natural abilities with a handgun.

== Champions ==
Individual

Overall	Competitor	Points	Overall Match Percent	
Gold	(United States) Doug Koenig	1280.6405	100.00%	
Silver	(United States) Jerry Barnhart	1276.2911	99.66%	
Bronze	(United States) Rob Leatham	1263.7700	98.68%	
4th	(United States) J Michael Plaxco	1221.0056	95.34%	
5th	(United States) Brian Enos	1182.7773	92.36%	
6th	(United States) Frank Garcia	1165.1092	90.98%	
7th	(United States) Douglas Boykin	1161.6251	90.71%	
8th	(United States) Mark Mazzotta	1151.7415	89.93%	
9th	(Australia) Ed Danko	1127.5860	88.05%	
10th	(Australia) Ken Carter	1125.6484	87.90%	
Lady	Competitor	Points	Category percent	Overall percent
Gold	(United States) Deborah James	950.2414	100.00%	74.20%
Silver	(United States) Kippi Boykin	936.0020	73.09%	98.50%
Bronze	(United States) Shirley Hamilton	891.2530	69.59%	93.79%
Junior	Competitor	Points	Category percent	Overall percent
Gold	(Australia) Suzy Ballantyne		100.00%	

Teams

Overall	Country	Team members	Points	Percent
Gold	United States			100.00%
Silver	Australia			%
Bronze				%
4th				%
5th				%
6th				%

== See also ==
- IPSC Rifle World Shoots
- IPSC Shotgun World Shoot
- IPSC Action Air World Shoot
