= International Precision Rifle Federation =

- Sport: Field and long range shooting
- Category: Shooting sport
- Jurisdiction: International
- Abbreviation: IPRF
- Founded: 2021

Official website
- precisionrifle.org

The International Precision Rifle Federation (IPRF) is an international federation for field and long range shooting. The shooting takes place from various positions and at varied distances within a limited par time, so that the competitors need to have a good understanding about their ballistics so that they can compensate for wind and distance. Competitors are divided into different divisions based on their firearms and equipment. All competitors compete inside their division, and there can also be awards for the categories women, junior (competitors of 18 years or younger), senior (competitors of 55 years or older) and military/police. A match usually consists of several stages, and points are awarded by the number of hits. Steel targets are used to a large degree to make it easy to score points and as an economical alternative to electronic targets. Referees often use spotting scopes to observe and count hits.

== History ==
PRS shooting in its current form originated in the USA in the 2010s in the Precision Rifle Series, which continues to this day as the American arm of precision rifle shooting. The National Rifle League (NRL) is another U.S. organization for precision rifle shooting. In the USA, the number of active competitors increased from 164 in 2012 to over 15 000 in 2020.

In 2021 the International Precision Rifle Federation (IPRF) was founded, and in 2022 the first world championship was held at the Bitche Military Camp in Bitche, France.

IPRF has affiliated associations in several countries:

- Australia: Australian Precision Rifle Association
- Austria: Austrian Precision Rifle Association
- Canada: Canadian Precision Rifle Association
- Chile: Federación Chilena de Rifles de Precisión
- Czechia: Czech Precision Rifle Association
- France: French precision Rifle Association
- Georgia: Georgian Precision Rifle Federation
- Germany: Deutsche Precision Rifle Association
- Great Britain: Great Britain Precision Rifle Association
- Greece: Hellenic Shooting Federation
- Hungary: Hungarian Dynamic Shooting Sport Federation
- Indonesia: Indonesian Precision Rifle Association
- Ireland: Irish Precision Rifle Association
- Italy: PRS Italia
- Lithuania: Lithuania Practical Shooting Sport Federation
- Namibia: Namibian Precision Rifle Association
- Norway: Precision Rifle Norway
- Poland: Polish Precision Rifle Association
- Russia: Rossniping Tactical Shooting Association (Voluntarily withdrawn until further notice)
- Slovakia: Slovak Precision Rifle Association
- Slovenia: Slovenia Precision Rifle Association
- South Africa: South African Precision Rifle Federation
- Spain: Spanish Precision Rifle Association
- Sweden: Swedish Shooting Sport Federation
- United States: United States Precision Rifle Association
- Thailand: Thailand Precision Rilfe Association (THPRA)

== Equipment divisions ==
The participants are divided into separate divisions based on the type of equipment used. It is common to use scopes with adjustable magnification, and cartdidges with calibers between 6 mm and 6.5 mm (for example 6 mm Dasher, 6.5 mm Creedmoor or 6.5×55 mm) because these tend to provide good ballistics at typical match distances and relatively little recoil. Internationally, the divisions used are Open (most permitted modifications), Limited and Factory (factory firearms with few modifications). Locally, other divisions may be used or none at all.

== Matches ==
All competitors go through the same stages regardless of registered division and category. It is mainly competed individually, but at larger events there can also be team competitions where the results from the individual team members are pooled together to achieve a teams core.

=== 2022 World Championships ===
In 2022 the first World Championship was held by the French Army 16^{e} bataillon de chasseurs à pied and Ultimate Ballistics at the Bitche Military Camp in Bitche France.

Open

Overall	Competitor	Points	Match percent	
Gold	(United States) Austin Buschman	158	100.00%	
Silver	(United States) Morgun King	157	99.37%	
Bronze	(United States) Tate Streater	156	98.73%	
4	(United States) Clay Blackketter	155	98.10%	
5	(United States) Gregory Bell	151	95.57%	
6	(Denmark) Mathias Nedergård	147	93.04%	
7	(Namibia) Dirk Sauber	145	91.77%	
8	(United States) Austin Orgain	144	91.44%	
9	(Sweden) Joakim Stigenberg	144	91.44%	
10	(Norway) Jarnes Mydland	143	87.90%	
Lady	Competitor	Points	Category percent	Overall percent
Gold	(United States) Payton Grimes	136	100.00%	86.08%
Silver	(United States) Lauryl Akenhead	129	94.85%	81.65%
Bronze	(United States) Allison Zane	114	83.82%	72.15%
Senior	Competitor	Points	Category percent	Overall percent
Gold	(United States) Rusty Ulmer	136	100.00%	86.08%
Silver	(United States) Paul Higley	102	75.00%	64.56%
Bronze	(South Africa) Andries Lategan	98	72.06%	62.03%
Mil/LEO	Competitor	Points	Category percent	Overall percent
Gold	(Sweden) Louis-Philippe Rembry	122	100.00%	77.22%
Silver	(United Kingdom) Jack Crawford	121	99.18%	76.58%
Bronze	(United Kingdom) Daniel Owen	111	90.98%	70.25%

Teams Open

Overall	Country	Points	Percent
Gold	USA	396.2	100.00%
Silver	Sweden	353.8	89.30%
Bronze	Norway	333.54	84.18%
4	Denmark	321.52	81.15%
5	South Africa	319.62	80.67%
6	Great Britain and Northern Ireland	313.29	79.07%
7	Namibia	308.86	77.96%
8	Ireland	281.65	71.09%
9	France	241.77	61.02%
10	Spain	239.87	60.54%
11	Italy	226.58	57.19%
12	Slovakia	218.35	55.11%
13	Poland	188.61	47.60%
14	Germany	184.81	46.65%
15	Switzerland	182.28	46.01%
16	Czech Republic	127.85	32.27%

Limited

Overall	Competitor	Points	Match percent
Gold	(United States) Coulter Mariott	126	100.00%
Silver	(United States) Buck Holly	119	94.44%
Bronze	(United States) Leon Weatherby	112	88.89%
4	(United States) Matt Partain	112	88.89%
5	(Sweden) Erik Edlund	100	79.37%
6	(Sweden) Tobias Lindgren	93	73.81%
7	(Sweden) Fredrik Månsson	92	73.02%
8	(South Africa) Willem Van Biljon	89	70.63%
9	(Norway) Ronny Bonilla-sommer	86	68.25%
10	(South Africa) Benoit Marchand	84	66.67%

Teams Limited

Overall	Country	Points	Percent
Gold	USA	283.33	100.00%
Silver	Sweden	226.19	79.83%
Bronze	Norway	192.06	67.79%
4	France	186.51	65.83%
5	South Africa	184.13	64.99%
6	Italy	161.11	56.86%
7	Georgia	158.73	56.02%
8	Poland	141.27	49.86%

Factory

Overall	Competitor	Points	Match percent
Gold	(United Kingdom) Lawrence Barnes	116	100.00%
Silver	(South Africa) Perrin De Gouveia	102	87.93%
Bronze	(United Kingdom) Ben Mcilwaine	101	87.07%
4	Slovenia Juraj Cermak	100	86.21%
5	(United Kingdom) Thomas Rice	99	85.34%
6	(South Africa) Russell Ferreira	94	81.03%
7	(Poland) Piotr Antasik	93	80.17%
8	(Sweden) Mikael Önnervall	91	78.45%
9	(Norway) Krister Engvoll	89	76.72%
10	(Slovenia) Tomáš Kopča	87	75.00%

Teams Factory

Overall	Country	Points	Percent
Gold	Great Britain and Northern Ireland	272.41	100.00%
Silver	South Africa	242.24	88.92%
Bronze	Sweden	221.55	81.33%
4	France	190.52	69.94%
5	Poland	174.14	63.93%
6	Italy	168.97	62.03%

== See also ==
- International T-Class Confederation (ITCC), a similar shooting sport
- International Confederation of Fullbore Rifle Associations (ICFRA), the international shooting confederation for Palma and F-Class
