= PRS Norway =

Norwegian sport shooting association

- Sport: Precision Rifle Competitions
- Category: Shooting sport
- Founded: April 4, 2016
- Affiliation: International Precision Rifle Federation

Official website
- prsnorge.no

PRS Norway (established 2016) is a Norwegian sports association for field based long range and precision shooting competitions with fullbore rifles. It is the Norwegian representative of the International Precision Rifle Federation, and can be viewed as the Norwegian version of the American PRS Series. Norwegian competitions are arranged in a cup format similar to the U.S. version

== See also ==
- International T-Class Confederation (ITCC)
- Precision Rifle Series
- International Confederation of Fullbore Rifle Associations (ICFRA)

=== Other Norwegian shooting sport associations ===
- Dynamic Sports Shooting Norway
- National Rifle Association of Norway
- Norwegian Association of Hunters and Anglers
- Norwegian Benchrest Association
- Norwegian Biathlon Association
- Norwegian Black Poweder Association
- Norwegian Metallic Silhouette Association
- Norwegian Shooting Association
