= IPSC North American Handgun Championship =

The IPSC North American Championship are IPSC championships hosted in either the United States or Canada.

== History ==
- 1992 Toronto, Canada
- 1995 British Columbia, Canada (12. to 16. July)
- 1998 PASA, Barry, Illinois, United States (30. June to 3. July)

=== 1992 Championship ===
The 1992 championship North American Championship was held in conjunction with both the 1992 U.S. and Canadian national championships. Jerry Barnhart won the U.S. Championship as well as the North American Championship (both the last to feature no divisions), while Steve Johns won the Canadian national championship Open Division title and Ken Bell won the Canadian Standard Division title.

=== 1998 Championship ===
The 1998 match was an IPSC level 4 match, and consisted of 24 stages and a minimum of 300 rounds to be shot during three days.

== Champions ==
=== Overall category ===
Year	Division	Gold	Silver	Bronze	Venue
1992		(United States) Jerry Barnhart			Toronto, Canada
1995	Open	(United States) Rob Leatham			British Columbia, Canada
1995	Standard	(United States) Ron Avery			British Columbia, Canada
1998	Open	(United States) Todd Jarrett			Barry, Illinois, United States
1998	Modified				Barry, Illinois, United States
1998	Standard				Barry, Illinois, United States
