= Brian Enos =

American sport shooter

Personal information
- Born: Park Layne, Ohio
Medal record
IPSC
Representing United States
IPSC Handgun World Shoot
Silver medal – second place	1993 Bisley	Standard

Brian Enos (born in Park Layne, Ohio) is an American sport shooter who took silver in the Standard division at the 1993 IPSC Handgun World Shoot and has two silver medals from the IPSC US Handgun Championship. He also has two silver medals from the World Steel Challenge Championship and has won the U.S. National Steel Challenge Championship two times in the Limited division. Based on ten years of active shooting he in 1990 published the book "Practical Shooting, Beyond Fundamentals". He retired from active competition in 2000, and started building the Brian Enos forum. While he considers himself "an IPSC shooter at heart", he has also performed well at shooting matches such as The Masters, winner 1989, and the Sportsman's Team Challenge, five time member of winning team, and won the 1983 and 1984 Bianchi Cup.

== See also ==
- Rob Leatham
- Ron Avery
