= Lithuania Practical Shooting Sport Federation =

- Lietuvos Praktinio Saudymo Sporto Federacija
- Formation: 1998
- President: Vaidas Sabaliauskas
- Parent organization: International Practical Shooting Confederation, International Precision Rifle Federation
- Website: ipsc.lt

Lithuania Practical Shooting Sport Federation, Lithuanian Lietuvos Praktinio Saudymo Sporto Federacija, is the Lithuanian association for practical shooting under the International Practical Shooting Confederation.
