= IPSC Canadian Handgun Championship =

The IPSC Canadian Handgun Championship is an IPSC level 3 championship held once a year by the IPSC Canada.

== Champions ==
The following is a list of current and previous champions.

=== Overall category ===
Year	Division	Gold	Silver	Bronze	Venue
1978		(Canada) Murray Gardner	(Canada)	(Canada)	
1979		(Canada) Murray Gardner	(Canada)	(Canada)	
1980		(Canada) Murray Gardner	(Canada)	(Canada)	
1981		(Canada) Murray Gardner	(Canada)	(Canada)	
1982		(Canada) Murray Gardner	(Canada)	(Canada)	
1983		(Canada) Murray Gardner	(Canada)	(Canada)	
1984		(Canada) Murray Gardner	(Canada)	(Canada)	
1985		(Canada) Murray Gardner	(Canada)	(Canada)	
1986		(Canada) Gerald Le Mercier	(Canada)	(Canada)	
1987		(Canada) Nick Alexakos	(Canada)	(Canada)	
1988		(Canada) Randy Fisher	(Canada)	(Canada)	
1989		(Canada) Matt McLearn	(Canada)	(Canada)	
1990		(Canada) Paul Barrette	(Canada)	(Canada)	
1991		(Canada) Brad Hertz	(Canada)	(Canada)	
1992	Open	(Canada) Steve Johns	(Canada)	(Canada)	Toronto, held in conjunction with the North American Championship
1992	Standard	(Canada) Ken Bell	(Canada)	(Canada)	Toronto, held in conjunction with the North American Championship
1993	Open	(Canada) Don Leedham	(Canada)	(Canada)	
1993	Standard	(Canada) Dave Anderson	(Canada)	(Canada)	
1994	Open	(Canada) Derrill Imrie	(Canada)	(Canada)	
1994	Standard	(Canada) Steven Stewart	(Canada)	(Canada)	
1995	Open	(Canada) Derrill Imrie	(Canada)	(Canada)	
1995	Standard	(Canada) Todd Hullock	(Canada)	(Canada)	
1996	Open	(Canada) Derrill Imrie	(Canada)	(Canada)	
1996	Standard	(Canada) Don Leedham	(Canada)	(Canada)	
1997	Open	(Canada) Derrill Imrie	(Canada)	(Canada)	
1997	Standard	(Canada) Don Leedham	(Canada)	(Canada)	
1998	Open	(Canada) Derrill Imrie	(Canada)	(Canada)	
1998	Standard	(Canada) Terry Maxwell	(Canada)	(Canada)	
2003	Open	(Canada) Derrill Imrie	(Canada) Mike Auger	(Canada) Nick King	
2003	Standard	(Canada) Wolf Hofmann	(Canada) Mike Burrell	(Canada) Ivan Runions	
2003	Production	(Canada) Nick Manioudakis	(Canada) Robert Engh	(Canada) Cliff Meek	
