= IPSC Canada =

- Formation: 1976
- Parent organization: International Practical Shooting Confederation
- Website: ipsc-canada.org

IPSC Canada is the Canadian association for practical shooting under the International Practical Shooting Confederation, and consists of nine sections: Alberta, British Columbia, Manitoba, New Brunswick, Newfoundland, Nova Scotia, Ontario, Quebec and Saskatchewan

== See also ==
- IPSC Canadian Handgun Championship
