= Tatsuya Sakai (marksman) =

Japanese sport shooter

Tatsuya Sakai is a Japanese sport shooter who won the 2004 Steel Challenge World Championship in Piru, California. Since handguns cannot be legally obtained by civilians in Japan, he trained at home using an airsoft pistol. A month before the championship he went to California to train with a real gun, and placed first 0.59 seconds before KC Eusebio.
