= IPSC Pan-American Handgun Championship =

International shooting competition

The IPSC Pan-American Handgun Championship is an IPSC level 4 championship hosted every third year in North- or South-America.

== History ==
- 1997
- 2000 Illinois, United States
- 2003 Guayaquil, Ecuador
- 2006 Brasília, Brazil
- 2009 Guayaquil, Ecuador
- 2012 Asunción, Paraguay
- 2015 Cuiabá, Brazil
- 2018 Kingston and May Pen, Jamaica
- 2021 Florida, United States

== Champions ==
The following is a list of current and past IPSC Pan-American Handgun Champions.

=== Overall category ===
Year	Division	Gold	Silver	Bronze	Venue
1997	Open	(United States) Rob Leatham			
1997	Modified	(Uruguay) Gregorio Luccisano			
1997	Standard	(Argentina) Ricardo Gentile			
2000	Open	(United States) Todd Jarrett			Illinois, United States
2000	Open	(Venezuela) Francisco Vigil			Illinois, United States
2000	Modified	(Brazil) Ildea Martins			Illinois, United States
2000	Standard	(United States) Matt Burkett			Illinois, United States
2000	Production	(Uruguay) Juan Jos Diaz			Illinois, United States
2003	Open	(Argentina) Fabricio Gigli			Guayaquil, Ecuador
2003	Standard	(Guatemala) Estuardo Gomez			Guayaquil, Ecuador
2003	Production	(United States) Dave Sevigny			Guayaquil, Ecuador
2006	Open	(Brazil) Jaime Saldanha Jr			Brasília, Brazil
2006	Revolver	(Brazil) Allison Vericio			Brasília, Brazil
2009	Open	(Venezuela) Jose Alfredo Gonzalez			Guayaquil, Ecuador
2009	Standard	(Argentina) Jorge Baigorria			Guayaquil, Ecuador
2009	Production	(United States) Angus Hobdell			Guayaquil, Ecuador
2009	Classic	(Brazil) Augusto Ribas			Guayaquil, Ecuador
2009	Revolver				Guayaquil, Ecuador
2012	Standard	(Brazil) Jaime Saldanha Jr			
2015	Open	(Brazil) STEVENSON CARVALHO, JOÃO CARLOS	CAPLAN DE ARAÚJO, MÁRCIO GABRIEL	COUTINHO FILHO, PAULO	Brasília, Brazil
2015	Standard	(Brazil) MAIA SALDANHA JUNIOR, JAIME ROBERTO	NETO, ALVARO	ROITMAN, PATRICIO	Brasília, Brazil
2015	Production	(Argentina) Daniel Minaglia	Felipe Sarkis	German Romitelli	Brasília, Brazil
2015	Classic	(Brazil) ISHIHARA, LUIS HENRIQUE I	CHAIN, FLÁVIO	TONDINI, CLAUDIO	Brasília, Brazil
2018	Open	(Jamaica) Murdock, Lesgar	Minaglia, Daniel Horacio	Balbi, Martin	Kingston, Jamaica
2018	Standard	(Canada) Burrell, Michael	Yap, Andrew	Nascimento, Alessandro	Kingston, Jamaica
2018	Production	(Argentina) Romitelli, German	Reed, Casey	Berdat, Alexandre	Kingston, Jamaica
2018	Classic	(United States) Foley, Mike	Stedman, Roy	Gomes Neto, Roberto Lourenc	Kingston, Jamaica

=== Lady category ===
Year	Division	Gold	Silver	Bronze	Venue
2000	Open Lady	(United States) Kay Clark-Miculek			
2018	Production Lady	(United States) Williams, Justine	(Argentina) Biglia, Florencia	Lagoeiro, Julia Pinheiro	

=== Junior category ===
Year	Division	Gold	Silver	Bronze	Venue
2000	Open	(United States) Max Michel			
2003	Production	(Colombia) Nicolas Cardozo			

=== Senior category ===
Year	Division	Gold	Silver	Bronze	Venue
2000	Open	(Canada) Mike Auger			
2000	Standard	(Canada) Murray Gardner			
2018	Open	(Argentina) Balbi, Martin	Garcia, Frank	Storey, James	Jamaica
2018	Standard	(Canada) Job, Jean-Paul	Domingues Oliveira, Lucimar	Oliveira, Eduardo Jose De	Jamaica
2018	Classic	(United States) Stedman, Roy	Runions, Ivan	Smith, James	Jamaica
2018	Production	(Argentina) Borges, Walter Santiago	Johnson, Anthony	Nunez, Christopher	Jamaica

=== Super Senior category ===
Year	Division	Gold	Silver	Bronze	Venue
2018	Classic	(Canada) Korobkin, Anatoli	Novak, Robert	Sanford, Ralph	Jamaica
