= Federation of German Marksmen =

German shooting sports association

The Federation of German Marksmen
- Bund Deutscher Sportschützen
- Formation: 1975
- President: Friedrich Gepperth
- Parent organization: International Practical Shooting Confederation; International Precision Rifle Federation; International Metallic Silhouette Shooting Union; World Field Target Federation
- Website: bdsnet.de

The Federation of German Marksmen 1975 (registered association), German Bund Deutscher Sportschützen (BDS), is the second largest shooting sports association in Germany after the German Shooting and Archery Federation. Primarily it promotes sport shooting using firearms and as such small and big bore pistols, revolvers, rifles and shotguns. The BDS is the largest sport shooting association for licensed gun owners in Germany. As of 2020 there are about 80 000 individual members in 2.500 clubs. BDS is also the regional representative of IPSC in Germany.

== See also ==
- IPSC German Rifle Championship
