= Dynamic Shooting Sport Federation of Hungary =

Sports governing body in Hungary

- Magyar Dinamikus Lövészsport Szövetség
- Parent organization: International Practical Shooting Confederation
- Website: mdlsz.sport.hu

Dynamic Shooting Sport Federation of Hungary, Hungarian Magyar Dinamikus Lövészsport Szövetség, is the Hungarian association for practical shooting under the International Practical Shooting Confederation (IPSC) as well as precision rifle shooting under International Precision Rifle Federation (IPRF) and metallic silhouette shooting under the International Metallic Silhouette Shooting Union (IMSSU).
