= 1986 IPSC Handgun World Shoot =

International shooting tournament

1986 IPSC Handgun World Shoot VII
- Location: Florida, United States

Medalists
gold medal	(United States) Rob Leatham
silver medal	(United States) Jerry Barnhart
bronze medal	(United States) John Shaw

The 1986 IPSC Handgun World Shoot VII held in Florida, United States was the seventh IPSC Handgun World Shoot, and was won by Rob Leatham of United States.

== Champions ==
Individual

Overall	Competitor	Points	Percent
Gold	(United States) Rob Leatham		100.00%
Silver	(United States) Jerry Barnhart		%
Bronze	(United States) John Shaw		%
4th			%
5th			%
6th			%
7th			%
8th			%
9th			%
10th			%

Teams

Overall	Country	Points	Percent	Team members
Gold			100.00%	
Silver			%	
Bronze			%	
4th			%	
5th			%	
6th			%	

== See also ==
- IPSC Rifle World Shoots
- IPSC Shotgun World Shoot
- IPSC Action Air World Shoot
