= Doug Koenig =

American sport shooter

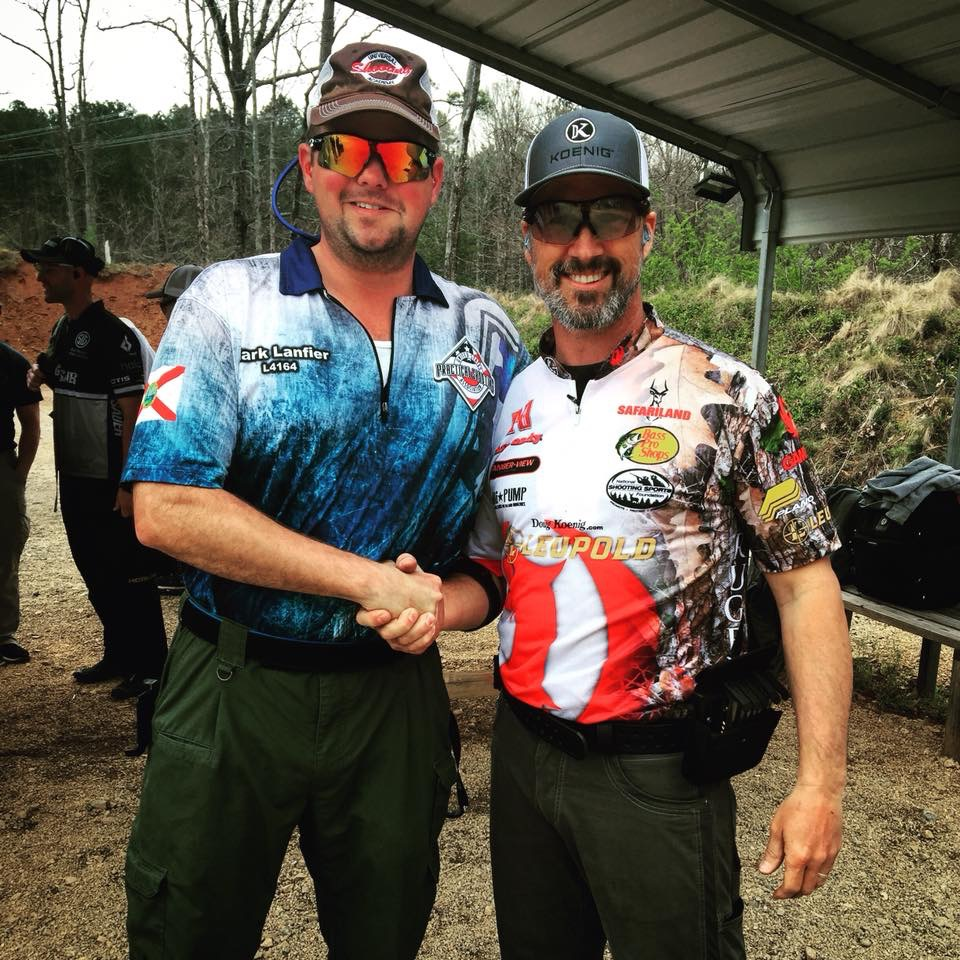
- Doug Koenig at the 2018 US Steel Challenge Championship

Personal information
- National team: USA
- Born: Pennsylvania
Medal record
IPSC
Representing United States
IPSC Handgun World Shoot
Gold medal – first place	1990 Adelaide
Silver medal – second place	1993 Bisley	Open

Doug Koenig is an American sport shooter and one of the most decorated competitors in the history of American precision shooting sports. At the 1990 IPSC Handgun World Shoot, Koenig became the first athlete to win a world championship using a red dot sight rather than traditional iron sights, a milestone that helped usher in a new era of optics in competitive shooting. He followed this with a silver medal in the 1993 IPSC Handgun World Shoot and a bronze in 1991.

Koenig is best known for his record-setting performance at the Bianchi Cup, where he has won 18 championship titles, making him the most successful shooter in the event’s history. His first-place finishes span from 1990 through 2024, with only a handful of second-place showings during that period.

He is also a three-time champion of the Steel Challenge World Speed Shooting Championships (1999, 2000, 2001), and has earned additional medals at the IPSC US Handgun Championship and the US National Steel Championship.

In addition to his pistol accolades, Koenig has found success in Precision Rifle Series, particularly in the PRS Production Class, where he won the National Production Class championship three years in a row (2019–2021) with perfect scores and continued to place among the top finishers in 2022 and 2024.

Koenig’s career reflects a level of versatility across both handgun and rifle disciplines, and he is regarded as 'one of the greatest competitive shooters of all time.'

== Professional career ==
=== Pistol ===
The Bianchi Cup

Year	Country	Finish	Score	Gun
1990	(United States)	1st	1920-157x	S&W Model 10
1992	(United States)	1st	1920-169x	
1998	(United States)	1st	1920-180x	
2000	(United States)	1st	1920-185x	
2001	(United States)	1st	1920-184x	
2002	(United States)	1st	1920-184x	
2003	(United States)	1st	1920-183x	
2004	(United States)	1st	1920-177x	
2005	(United States)	1st	1920-185x	
2006	(United States)	2nd	1920-174x	Caspian 1911
2007	(United States)	1st	1920-185x	
2008	(United States)	1st	1918-185x	
2009	(United States)	2nd	1920-177x	Caspian 1911
2010	(United States)	1st	1920-179x	
2011	(United States)	1st	1920-187x	
2012	(United States)	1st	1920-182x	
2013	(United States)	1st	1920-183x	
2014	(United States)	2nd	1918-182x	
2015	(United States)	1st	1920-180x	S&W 1911
2016	(United States)	1st	1920-183x	S&W 1911
2017	(United States)	1st	1920-184x	S&W 1911
2018	(United States)	2nd*	1920-172x	
2021	(United States)	1st	1920-182x	
2024	(United States)	1st	1920-183x	
2025	(United States)	2nd	1918-180x	

*Doug Koenig & Mark Blake tied for second place in 2018, each with a score of 1920-172x, the champion was Adam Sokolowski with a score of 1920-176x

Finish	Year	Country	Competition
Gold*	1990	(United States)	IPSC Handgun World Shoots
Bronze	1991	(United States)	IPSC Handgun World Shoots
Silver	1993	(United States)	IPSC Handgun World Shoots
Gold	1999	(United States)	Steel Challenge
Gold	2000	(United States)	Steel Challenge
Gold	2001	(United States)	Steel Challenge
Bronze	2014	(United States)	US National Steel Champions
Silver	1995	(United States)	IPSC US Handgun Championship

*The first competitor to win the World Shoot using a red dot sight.

=== Rifle ===
PRS Production Class Results

YEAR	State	Finish	Points
2019	PA	1st	500.000
2020	PA	1st	500.000
2021	PA	1st	500.000
2022	PA	2nd	490.361
2024	PA	3rd	451.837
