= IPSC German Rifle Championship =

Sport shooting competition in Germany

The IPSC German Rifle Championship is an IPSC level 3 championship held once a year by the Federation of German Marksmen.

== Champions ==
The following is a list of current and previous champions.

=== Overall category ===
Year	Division	Gold	Silver	Bronze	Venue
2012	Open	(Germany) Oliver Damm	(Germany) Patrick Bieri	(Germany) Matteo Pellegris	
2012	Standard	(Germany) Oliver Spoerner	(Germany) Georg Gonglach	(Germany) Jochen Richter	
2015	Open	(Germany) Markus Husterer	(Germany) Christian Holzapfel	(Germany) Siegbert Papzien	
2015	Standard	(Germany) Oliver Spoerner	(Germany) Georg Gonglach	(Germany) Jochen Richter	

=== Lady category ===
Year	Division	Gold	Silver	Bronze	Venue

=== Junior category ===
Year	Division	Gold	Silver	Bronze	Venue

=== Senior category ===
Year	Division	Gold	Silver	Bronze	Venue
2012	Open	(Germany) Matthias Gedeon	(Germany) Claus Rothweiler		
2015	Open	(Germany) Claus Rothweiler	(Germany) Matthias Gedeon	(Germany) Klaus Möller	
2015	Standard	(Germany) Frank Krause	(Germany) Armin Dietrich	(Germany) Tino Graf	

=== Super Senior category ===
Year	Division	Gold	Silver	Bronze	Venue
2012	Open	(Germany) Heint Gallenbach	(Germany) Roland Baage	(Germany)	
2015	Open	(Germany) Heinz Dr. Gallenbach	(Germany) Roland Baage	(Germany) Gauthier Sallet	
