= Steel Challenge =

Speed shooting competition

Steel Challenge Shooting Association
- Sport: Practical shooting
- Category: Shooting sports
- Jurisdiction: International
- Abbreviation: SCSA
- Founded: 1981
- Affiliation: United States Practical Shooting Association
- Affiliation date: 2007

Official website
- steelchallenge.com
- Founders: Mike Dalton and Mike Fichman

The Steel Challenge is a speed shooting competition governed by the Steel Challenge Shooting Association (SCSA) that consists of eight standardized stages with steel targets in three sizes; small circular, large circular and rectangular targets. Competitors are scored solely by the time it takes them to complete each stage, and the match winner is the competitor with the lowest overall time.

Steel Challenge has many similarities with IPSC, but has a more TV- and spectator friendly format because of simpler rules and the stages being the same from year to year. Because of this, Steel Challenge has become a place where speed records are set and broken. The annual World Championship called the World Speed Shooting Championships (WSSC) was held in Frostproof, Florida (2012 and 2013), St. George, Utah (2014), San Luis Obispo, California (2015 - 2017), Talladega, Alabama (2018 - 2023) and draws shooters from around the world. Up until 2011 the World Championship used to be held in Piru, California each year.

== History ==
The competition was founded in 1981 by Mike Dalton and Mike Fichman. The Steel Challenge World Speed Shooting Championships have grown to one of the largest professional pistol competitions in America. In 2007, more than 220 competitors from the United States and around the world competed for a portion of the $390,000 in cash and prizes - the largest purse in competitive pistol shooting.

Seventy shooters competed in the first Steel Challenge in 1981. John Shaw claimed the first ‘World’s Fastest Shooter’ title along with his share of the $20,000 in cash and prizes.

In the winter of 2007, Dalton and Fichman sold the Steel Challenge to the United States Practical Shooting Association (USPSA) which is the US sanctioning body of IPSC. Since 2007, USPSA has been organizing US National Steel Championship every year in US.

== Stages ==
There are 8 stages with 5 steel targets on each. Shooters get five runs on each stage. Each competitor shoots each stage five times, with their slowest run dropped, excluding the stage Outer Limits where only four runs are shot and the top three counted. The counting times are totaled for their stage score, and the eight stage scores are added together to establish the competitor's match score.

For each run, one hit per target is required, with an unlimited number of rounds. The last target to be shot is known as the "stop plate", which stops the timer. Any primary targets that have not been hit after the stop plate has been struck, will be scored with a 3-second penalty each. The maximum time permitted for a run is 30 seconds and a competitor will be stopped and asked to reload if they reach the 30 second limit.

The Steel Challenge comprises eight courses of fire called 'stages.' They are:

1. Five To Go (diagram)
2. Showdown (diagram)
3. Smoke & Hope (diagram)
4. Outer Limits (diagram)
5. Accelerator (diagram)
6. Pendulum (diagram)
7. Speed Option (diagram)
8. Roundabout (diagram)
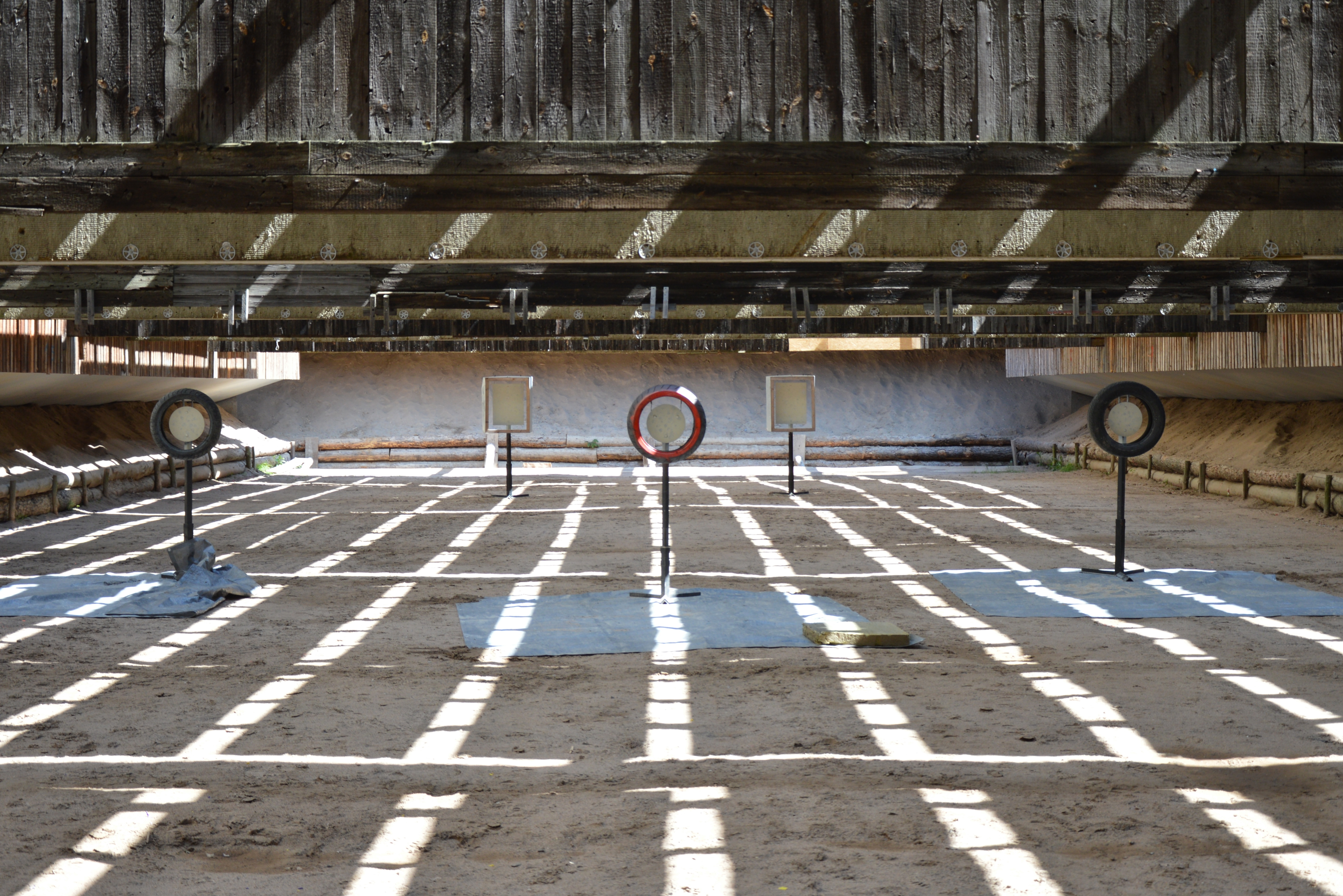
The stage "Outer Limits" set up on a shooting range in Germany.

All stages have competitors fire from square boxes. In the American Steel Challenge, the boxes have side lengths of 3 ft (91.44 cm), except the stage Outer Limits where the boxes' sides are 4 ft (1.22 m). The European Steel Challenge has used boxes of 1×1 meter on all stages.

Showdown has two boxes, and requires the competitor to make the first two runs from one of the boxes, and the two following runs from the other box. On the fifth and final run the competitor can choose which box to shoot from. There is no movement, so each run is to be shot from one box only. The competitor can choose whether to make the two first runs from the left or right box.

Outer Limits has the longest shots in the match, and is also the only stage with movement. Contrary to the other stages, Outer Limits only has four runs (instead of five), which with one throwaway run makes for three counting runs in the aggregate score. In the American Steel Challenge the shooting boxes on Outer Limits are larger than those on the other stages. The stage has three boxes, and the competitor starts on their weakhand side. For example, for a right handed shooter, the procedure is to start in the leftmost box from where they are to engage the leftmost 12 in (30.48 cm) plate at 20 yd (18.29 m) and the leftmost 18×24 in plate (45.7×60.9 cm) plate at 35 yards (32 m). Thereafter the shooter is to move to the center box and engage the two similar plates on their stronghand side, before engaging the stop plate.

=== Targets ===
Every stage consists of 5 steel targets, giving a total of 40 targets for a match with all eight official World Championship stages. A World Championship will therefore consist of minimum 195 rounds to complete, since all stages are shot five times except Outer Limits which is only shot four times. The targets must be made of hardened steel. It is recommended that the targets have a completely flat front surface and a pole attachment at the rear, but targets with holes for attachment are also permitted. All targets must be painted with white color before each new shooter, but the match organizer may choose to use another single color due to weather conditions (e.g. snow). Unofficial stages at club matches may be painted in another single color. It is recommended that the target stands of the stop plates are painted in a distinct color, for instance red.

Steel Challenge target sizes
Type and numbers	European Championship	World Championship (USA)
Small round plates (9 pieces)	25 cm	25,4 cm (10″)
Large round plates (20 pieces)	30 cm	30.48 cm (12″)
Square plates (11 pieces)	40 × 60 cm	45.72 × 60.96 cm (18 × 24″)

== Equipment divisions ==
The equipment divisions in Steel Challenge have varied past the years. The 2017 Steel Challenge World Championship had the following divisions:

Handguns

- Open (OPN)
- Limited (LTD)
- Production (PROD)
- Single Stack (SS)
- Iron Sight Revolver (ISR)
- Open Revolver (OSR)
- Carry Optics (CO)
- Rimfire Pistol Irons (RFPI)
- Rimfire Pistol Open (RFPO)

Long guns

- Rimfire Rifle Irons (RFRI)
- Rimfire Rifle Open (RFRO)
- Pistol Caliber Carbine Irons (PCCI)
- Pistol Caliber Carbine Open (PCCO)

=== Special awards ===
- "Steel Master" is awarded to the competitor with the lowest aggregate time from three completed handgun divisions.
  - One has to be Rimfire Pistol (Optics or Irons)
  - The other two has to be Centerfire Pistol or Revolver, but only one of them can be optically sighted.
- "Rifle Master" is awarded to the competitor with the lowest aggregate time from two completed rifle divisions.
  - One has to be Rimfire Rifle (Optics or Irons)
  - The other has to be Pistol Caliber Carbine (Optics or Irons)

== World records ==
To be considered a world record, the run must come during the annual World Speed Shooting Championship.

Current World Speed Shooting Records for Men and Women
Stage	Time	Competitor	Avg. Run	Year
Match Record	74.84 s	(United States) Max Michel		2016
Match Record	88.62 s	(United States) Jessie Harrison		2018
1. Five To Go	8.73 s	(United States) KC Eusebio	2.18 s	2018
1. Five To Go	11.94 s	(United States) Jessie Duff	2.98 s	2014
2. Showdown	7.59 s	(United States) BJ Norris	1.90 s	2019
2. Showdown	10.27 s	(United States) Jessie Duff	2.57 s	2010
3. Smoke & Hope	6.81 s	(United States) Max Michel	1.70 s	2018
3. Smoke & Hope	9.05 s	(United States) Kaci Cochran	2.26 s	2013
4. Outer Limits	10.95 s	(United States) Max Michel	3.65 s	2016
4. Outer Limits	13.26 s	(United States) Kaci Cochran	4.42 s	2013
5. Accelerator	8.70 s	(United States) Max Michel	2.18 s	2013
5. Accelerator	11.19 s	(United States) Jessie Duff	2.80 s	2009
6. Pendulum	9.56 s	(United States) BJ Norris	2.39 s	2016
6. Pendulum	11.75 s	(United States) Jessie Duff	2.94 s	2013
7. Speed Option	9.09 s	(United States) Max Michel	2.27 s	2013
7. Speed Option	11.65 s	(United States) Jessie Duff	2.91 s	2013
8. Roundabout	7.17 s	(United States) Max Michel	1.79 s	2019
8. Roundabout	9.41 s	(United States) Jessie Duff	2.35 s	2009

== Current and past world champions ==
List of overall Steel Challenge world champions (across all divisions)
Year	Top Men	Top Woman
1981	(United States) John Shaw	(United States) Melba Pruitt
1982	(United States) J. Michael Plaxco	(United States) Pamela Morris
1983	(United States) Mickey Fowler	(United States) Linda Zubiena
1984	(United States) Nick Pruitt	(United States) Lee Cole
1985	(United States) Rob Leatham	(United States) Lee Cole
1986	(United States) Chip McCormick	(United States) Jo Anne Hall
1987	(United States) Jerry Barnhart	(United States) Michelle Griggs
1988	(United States) Chip McCormick	(United States) Suzan Cooper
1989	(United States) Angelo Spagnoli	(United States) Shirley Hamilton
1990	(Philippines) Jethro Dionisio	(United States) Judy Woolley
1991	(United States) Jerry Barnhart	(United States) Judy Woolley
1992	(Philippines) Jethro Dionisio	(United States) Valerie Levanza
1993	(Philippines) Jethro Dionisio	(United States) Valerie Levanza
1994	(No championship held)	
1995	(No championship held)	
1996	(No championship held)	
1997	(Australia) Ross Newell	(United States) Kay Clark-Miculek
1998	(United States) Jerry Barnhart	(United States) Cathy Levanza
1999	(United States) Doug Koenig	(United States) Julie Goloski
2000	(United States) Doug Koenig	(United States) Kay Clark-Miculek
2001	(United States) Doug Koenig	(United States) Kay Clark-Miculek
2002	(United States) Rob Leatham	(Philippines) Athena Lee
2003	(United States) KC Eusebio	(Philippines) Athena Lee
2004	(Japan) Tatsuya Sakai	(United States) Kay Clark-Miculek
2005	(United States) Max Michel	(United States) Kay Clark-Miculek
2006	(United States) JJ Racaza	(United States) Kay Clark-Miculek
2007	(United States) Max Michel	(United States) Jessie Duff
2008	(United States) KC Eusebio	(United States) Kay Clark-Miculek
2009	(United States) Max Michel	(United States) Jessie Duff
2010	(United States) KC Eusebio	(United States) Jessie Duff
2011	(United States) BJ Norris	(United States) Jessie Duff
2012	(United States) KC Eusebio	(United States) Jessie Duff
2013	(United States) Max Michel	(United States) Jessie Duff
2014	(United States) Max Michel	(United States) Jessie Duff
2015	(United States) Max Michel	(United States) Jessie Duff
2016	(United States) Max Michel	(United States) Jessie Duff
2017	(United States) BJ Norris	(United States) Jessie Harrison
2018	(United States) KC Eusebio	(United States) Jessie Harrison
2019	(United States) BJ Norris	(United States) Jessie Harrison

== US National Steel Champions ==
List of overall US National Steel champions (across all divisions)
Year	Gold	Silver	Bronze
2007	(United States) KC Eusebio	(United States) Todd Jarrett	(United States) Max Michel
2008	(United States) Max Michel	(United States) BJ Norris	(United States) KC Eusebio
2009	(United States) Max Michel	(United States) BJ Norris	(United States) Dave Sevigny
2010	(United States) KC Eusebio	(United States) Max Michel	(United States) Dave Sevigny
2011	(United States) Max Michel	(United States) KC Eusebio	(United States) BJ Norris
2012	(United States) KC Eusebio	(United States) BJ Norris	(United States) Max Michel
2013	(United States) KC Eusebio	(United States) Max Michel	(Japan) Muneki Samejima
2014	(United States) Max Michel	(United States) Jerry Barnhart	(United States) Doug Koenig
2015	(United States) KC Eusebio	(United States) Max Michel	(United States) BJ Norris
2016	(United States) KC Eusebio	(United States) BJ Norris	(United States) Max Michel
2017	(United States) Max Michel	(United States) KC Eusebio	(United States) BJ Norris
2018	(United States) Max Michel	(United States) BJ Norris	(United States) KC Eusebio
2019	(United States) Max Michel	(United States) KC Eusebio	(United States) BJ Norris

== Press coverage ==
Since at least 2003, the Shooting Gallery show on the nationally syndicated Outdoor Channel has covered each Steel Challenge championship. It has also been covered in other press, including notable articles in American Handgunner, GunWeek, and Outdoor Life.

== See also ==
- List of shooting sports organizations
- Bianchi Cup
