= Bianchi International =

American leather and nylon producer

Bianchi International of Temecula, California, is a worldwide producer of leather and nylon goods for the law enforcement industry. Since the 1960s they have produced items from gun holsters to duty belts and everything related in between.

Armor Holdings bought Bianchi International in 2004; BAE Systems bought Armor in 2007.

John Bianchi, the founder of Bianchi International, was working together with his colleague, Neale Perkins, who later established his own company, Safariland. Bianchi's right-hand man was Richard Nichols, a talented designer who was instrumental in the design and development of most of the company's products for over twenty years. Both companies have since become major suppliers of law enforcement equipment.

Warren Kanders and the management team of Safariland acquired Safariland from BAE Systems for approximately $124 million in July 2012.

== See also ==
- The Bianchi Cup
- Police duty belt
- Sam Browne Belt
