= Jessie Harrison =

American sport shooter

Jessica Harrison
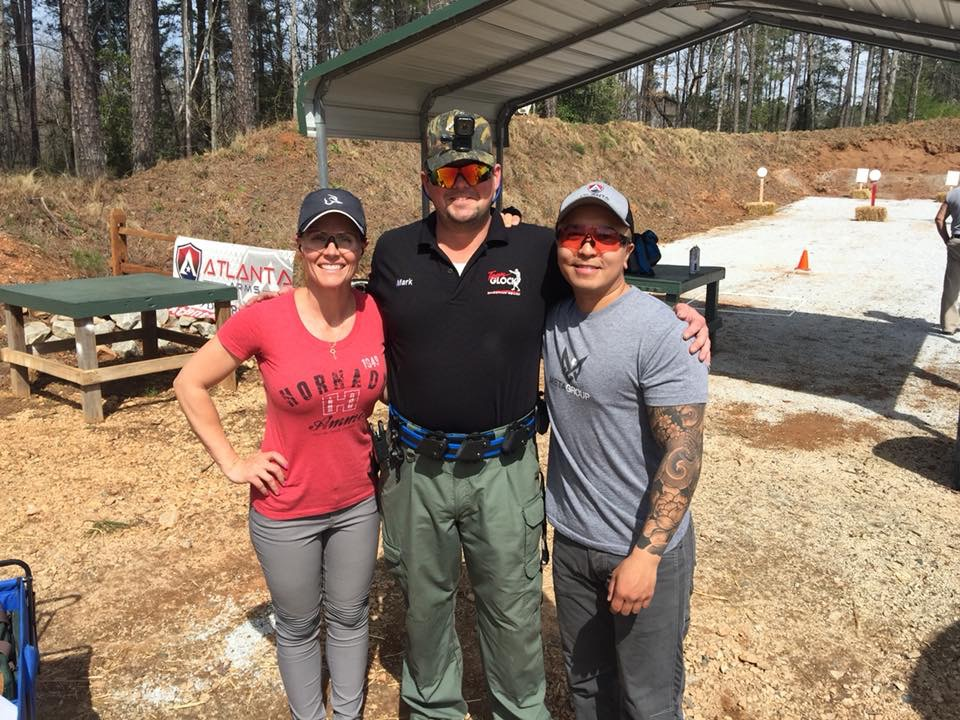
- Jessie Harrison at the 2018 US Steel Challenge Championship

Personal information
- Nationality: (United States) American
- Born: Jessica Harrison
- Occupation: IPSC shooter
- Website: www.jessieharrison.net

Sport
- Team: Team Taurus
Medal record
IPSC
Representing United States
IPSC Handgun World Shoot
| Bronze medal – third place | 2011 Rhodes | Lady Open |
| Silver medal – second place | 2017 Châteauroux | Lady Open |
IPSC US Handgun Championship
| Silver medal – second place | 2013 Frostproof | Lady Open |
| Gold medal – first place | 2015 Frostproof | Lady Open |

Jessie Harrison, formerly known as Jessie Duff, is an American sport shooter from McDonough, Georgia who took silver in the Open division Lady category at the 2017 IPSC Handgun World Shoot in Châteauroux, France and bronze at the 2011 IPSC Handgun World Shoot at Rhodes, Greece. In the IPSC US Handgun Championship she took gold in the Open division Lady category in 2015 and silver in 2013. She also has 16 USPSA Handgun Championship Lady category gold medals.

Jessie's shooting career began in Cowboy Action Shooting, before she transitioned to multigun and Steel Challenge. Today her focus is on IPSC and USPSA, Steel Challenge and NRA Action Pistol. Jessie is known to be the first female shooter who achieved the rank of Grand Master (GM) in the United States Practical Shooting Association (USPSA), which she did in the USPSA Open division by earning an average of 95% or higher in the classification courses. In 2001 she has won more championship titles in the state, regional, national, and world competitions than any other female shooter.

== Career ==
Harrison began her shooting career at a young age with her father, also a world champion. Her first World Champion title was earned in the Cowboy Action Shooting competition. She has also earned national and world titles from the Bianchi Cup, Steel Challenge World Speed Shooting Championships. Harrison is part of Team Weatherby as a celebrity spokesperson for the conservation of the sport of shooting and hunting. She is also the Team Captain of Team Taurus where she competes in world and national championships. Other than competing, Harrison is also a co-host on the Friends of NRA television show on the Outdoor Channel.

=== Merits ===
- 11 times Top Woman at the Steel Challenge World Speed Shooting Championships (WSSC) (2007, and 2009-2018)
- 16 times Lady category winner at the USPSA Handgun Championship between 2007 and 2015
- Bianchi World Cup 2014 Ladies Open Action Pistol World Champion
