= The Bianchi Cup =

Bianchi Cup
Tournament information
- Sport: Action Pistol
- Location: Hallsville, Missouri
- Established: 1979
- Administrator: Civilian Marksmanship Program
- Tournament format(s): Multi-day, multi-stage Tournament
- Venue: Green Valley Rifle & Pistol Club
- Website: https://thecmp.org/competitions/cmp-pistol-program/cmp-bianchi-cup/

The Bianchi Cup is a major action pistol tournament in the United States, held in May at the Green Valley Rifle & Pistol Club in Missouri. The Bianchi Cup is the only major shooting tournament that has retained its original course of fire since its inception.

Due to the diversity of stages, the tournament is widely considered one of the most difficult championships in all of the shooting sports.

In 2023, the Civilian Marksmanship Program (CMP) took over the match and rebranded it the CMP Bianchi Cup. Title sponsor of the CMP Bianchi Cup is the SDS Arms.

== CMP Bianchi Cup events ==
The CMP Bianchi Cup consists of four events: the Practical Event, the Moving Target (Mover) Event, the Barricade Event, and the Falling Plates Event. Competitors shoot from both standing and prone positions and are also required to shoot with strong and weak hands at various stages. There are no makeup shots in the CMP Bianchi Cup, adding to its difficulty. Competitors fire in Open, Metallic, Production and Production Optic classes within each event.

The Practical Event: Competitors fire at distances from 10 yards to 50 yards under varying time limits from the shooting line.

The Barricade Event: Competitors fire at targets on either side of the barricade at different distances and under varying time limits from within shooting boxes and behind barricades.

The Falling Plate Event: Competitors fire at eight-inch round steel plates arranged in banks of six at distances from 10 to 25 yards under varying time limits.

The Moving Target (Mover) Event: Competitors fire from within shooting boxes at distances ranging from 10 to 25 yards at a target moving from left to right, with the target exposed for six seconds.

The event draws top shooters from all over the world. Past international competitors have hailed from Austria, Australia, Canada, Germany, Italy, Japan, Lithuania, the Netherlands, New Zealand, Norway, Philippines, Saudi Arabia (1987–1989), Republic of South Africa, Switzerland, Taiwan (1996), Thailand (1993 and 1994), and the United Kingdom.

== Bianchi Cup History ==
The Bianchi cup is the second longest running pistol championship in the world. The event was created in 1979 by former police officer John Bianchi of holster maker Bianchi International as a Law Enforcement Training Match, in conjunction with 1975 IPSC World Champion, Ray Chapman and Richard Nichols. The first Bianchi Cup competition was held in 1979. In 1984, the National Rifle Association re-designated the event the NRA Bianchi Cup, National Action Pistol Championship. The competition has four stages, which make up the match aggregate. Each of these stages consists of 48 rounds for a total possible score of 480 for each stage and 1920 for a perfect overall score.

The Bianchi Cup is traditionally held the week before Memorial Day weekend (i.e. the week before the last Monday in May) every year since its inception in 1979. It is the first tournament that turns the sport of competition shooting as a whole from amateur to professional status by offering the winner a large cash prize in addition to trophies.

Before NRA took control in 1984, the overall winner took home the entire cash purse of $30,000 in addition to the Bianchi Cup itself. It has its origins in the law enforcement shooting community. With the creation of the Production Division, it has become one of the fastest growing disciplines in the action shooting community.

The first NRA World Action Pistol Championship match was held in the United States at the present home of the NRA Bianchi Cup in Columbia, MO. The year 1994 was the first time there were five countries competing for the Open Team event and three countries competing for the Women's Team event. Thereafter the World Action Pistol Championship was held in Adelaide Australia 1997, Hamilton New Zealand 1999, Italy 2001 and again in the US in Columbia MO in 2004. The NRA World Action Pistol Championships were then to be rotated to sponsor countries every two years from 2006 (Australia, Blacktown Rifle & Pistol Club) and returning to the United States every eight years (2012). In 2008 it was conducted in Hamilton, New Zealand, November 5–8. For 2010, the event returned to Sydney, Australia at the Blacktown Rifle & Pistol Club.

The Bianchi Cup has been one of the three championships of action shooting's triple crown, along with the IPSC U.S. Nationals, and the Steel Challenge.

Since its inception in 1979, with the 1985 championship year being the exception, the Bianchi Cup has retained its original courses of fire, consisting of four matches: Practical, Barricade, Moving Target and Falling Plates. Speed, accuracy, and precision are equally important factors and are considered fundamentals that form the core of the match, but most importantly, strong mental discipline on match days is the ultimate key to winning the Championship.

In 1985, the Practical Event was temporarily replaced by the 60-shot, 600-point International Rapid Fire Event, almost identical to that of the ISSF 25 m Rapid Fire Pistol Match. Initially, the main differences for the Bianchi Cup/NRA Action Pistol version was that it was to be fired from a standing, hands-over-shoulder starting position, gun holstered, on five Bianchi D-1 "Tombstone" cardboard targets placed 25 yards downrange, using center fire handguns, with the option of using the ground as support if one can make the time limit without incurring any late shot penalties. The total possible score for that year was 2040 points plus 204 x's. This sudden deviation from the original format proved unpopular, so organizers dropped it and re-instated the Practical Event the following year since.

The NRA National Action Shooting Tournament was a money-winning event. For his victory in 2008, Doug Koenig took home the 2008 Bianchi Cup trophy, plus total cash awards of over $8,000. Robert Vadasz Metallic Sight win netted him over $5000. For 2009, total prize money awarded increased over 30% from the previous year.

From 2009 on, the NRA Bianchi Cup offered an Open Division, Metallic Division and the new Production Division to bring more shooters to the sport. The NRA also introduced a Celebrity Pro-Am as a Saturday Event. The fan favorite spectacle included participants from the music, film and television branches of the entertainment industry including Mark Wills, Michael Peterson, Marshall Teague and Michael Talbott. Cowboy Mounted Shooting sensation Kenda Lenseigne made her first appearance at the Celebrity Pro-AM in 2010 and won.

The first competitor to fire a perfect score was Doug Koenig of Pennsylvania in 1990 with a 1920-157X.

The inaugural CMP Bianchi Cup in 2023 saw tremendous support from the 135 individuals who participated in the event, including several international competitors from Australia, Barbados, Germany, the Netherlands, New Zealand and Switzerland.

== Bianchi Cup champions ==
=== 2023 CMP Bianchi Cup ===
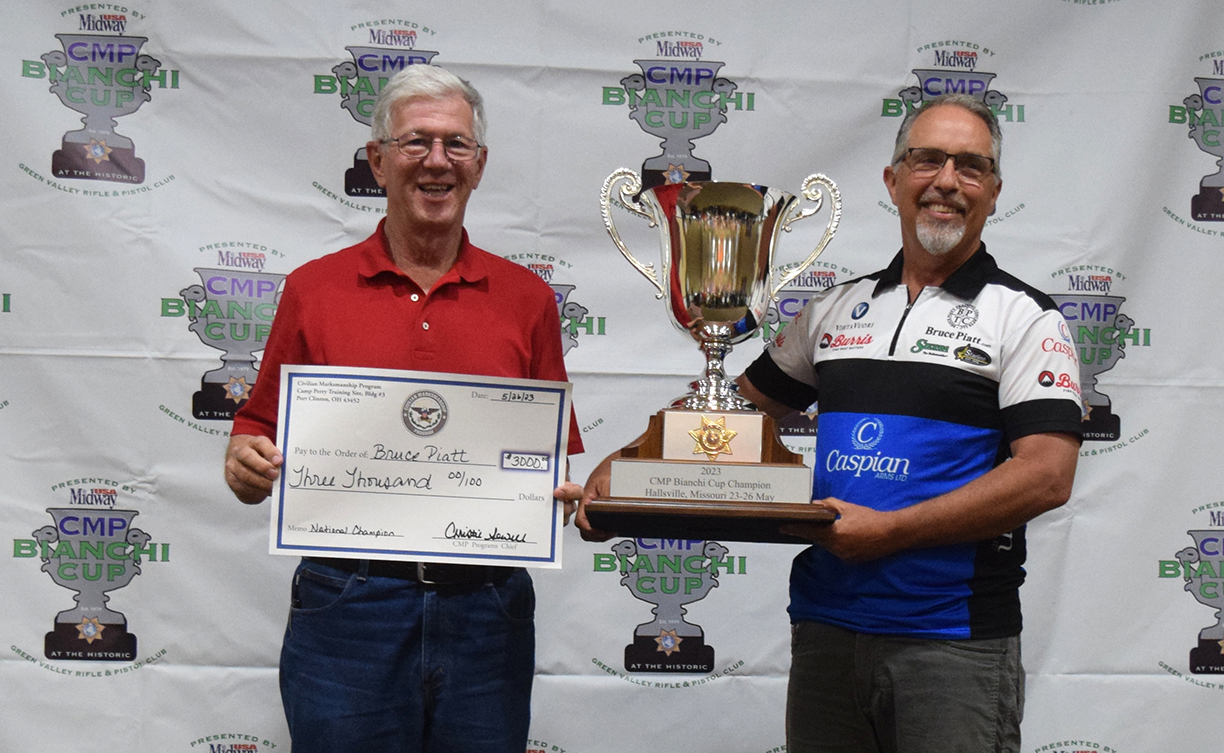
Bruce Piatt was the 2023 Bianchi Cup National Champion, marking his seventh Cup over 30 years.

National Action Pistol Championships National Champion: Bruce Piatt, 1920-178X

Open National National Champion: Mark Blake, 1920-178X

==== Practical results ====
Open: Douglas Koenig, 54, Deland, FL – 480-47X

Metallic: SFC Ryan Franks, 35, Ellerslie, GA – 480-34X

Production: SSG Christopher Hudock, 33, Columbus, GA – 469-26X

Production Optic: Simon Golob, 48, Kearney, MO – 480-33X

==== Mover results ====
Open: Mark Blake, 52, Huon Creek, Australia – 480-39X

Metallic: Roman Hauber, 57, Regensburg, Germany – 476-27X

Production: SSG Christopher Hudock, 33, Columbus, GA – 478-23X

Production Optic: SSG Anthony Heinauer, 26, Fort Benning, GA – 480-32X

==== Barricade results ====
1st: SSG Walter Johnson, 29, of Pine Mountain, GA – 480-48X

2nd: Brett Foster, 46, Bundabert, Queensland, Australia – 480-48X

3rd: Stephen Stewart, 50, Carlock, IL – 480-48X

==== Falling Plates Results ====
1st: Benito Martinez, 44, Albuquerque, NM – 480-48X

2nd: SSG Walter Johnson, 29, of Pine Mountain, GA – 480-48X

3rd: SSG Anthony Heinauer, 26, of Fort Benning, GA – 480-48X

==== 2-Man Team ====
Metallic: BDMP – 1848-121X

Production Optic: Team DHS – 1887-118X

International Team: Pistol Australia 1 – 1920-180X

4-Man Team: USAMU Blue (SSG Christopher Hudock, SFC Ryan Franks, SSG Anthony Heinauer, SSG Walter Johnson) – 1916-143X

==== Special categories ====
Military Veteran Champion – Mark Blake, 1920-178X

Law Enforcement Champion – Bruce Piatt, 1920-178X

Active Service Champion – SSG Walter Johnson, 1918-172X

Revolver Champion – Steve Weathersby, 1914-154X

International Champion – Mark Blake, 1920-178X

==== International championship awards ====
Grand Senior Champion: Vance Schmid, 1918-157X

John Cameron Memorial Senior Champion: Troy Mattheyer, 1916-154X

Roger E. Hawkins Memorial Junior National Champion: Malcolm Itzstein, 1892-142X

Woman National Champion: Sally Talbot, 1889-152X

Metallic National Champion: SFC Ryan Franks, USA, 1914-141X

Production National Champion: SSG Christopher Hudock, USA, 1901-128X

Production Optic National Champion: SSG Anthony Heinauer, 1916-146X

=== Previous Bianchi Cup champions ===
Doug Koenig is a nineteen-time Bianchi Cup champion. He had the most titles in NRA Action Pistol Championship history.

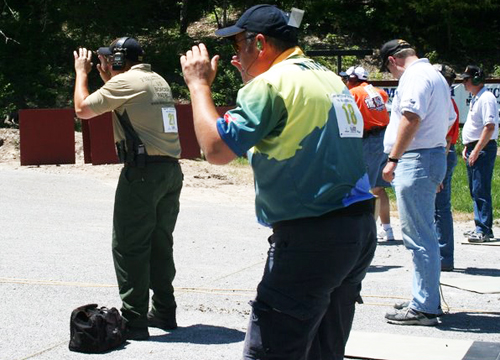
Rob Vadasz earned his second Bianchi Cup Metallic Division Championship by besting Rob Leatham by a full ten points at the 2010 NRA Bianchi Cup.

Jessie Abbate was the 2010 Bianchi Cup Women's Champion after beating Julie Goloski Golob for her first NRA Action Pistol Championship win.

==== Bianchi Cup winners ====
1979: (United States) Ron Lerch 1816-062x

1980: (United States) Mickey Fowler 1889-085x

1981: (United States) Mickey Fowler 1890-088x

1982: (United States) Mickey Fowler 1903-145x

1983: (United States) Brian Enos 1903-612x

1984: (United States) Brian Enos 1910-257x

==== NRA National Action Pistol Champions ====
1985: (United States) Rob Leatham 2034-155x

1986: (United States) W. Riley Gilmore 1916-144x

1987: (United States) John Pride 1912-151x

1988: (United States) John Pride 1918-163x

1989: (United States) Lemoine Wright 1914-152x

1990: (United States) Doug Koenig 1920-157x

1991: (United States) W. Riley Gilmore 1920-166x

1992: (United States) Doug Koenig 1920-169x

1993: (United States) Bruce Piatt 1920-170x

1993: Brian Kilpatrick, Australia 1920-173x

1994: (United States) John Pride 1920-174x

1995: (United States) John Pride 1920-179x

1996: (United States) Mickey Fowler 1918-184x

1996: Ross G. Newell, Australia 1920-163x

1997: (United States) Bruce Piatt 1920-181x

1998: (United States) Doug Koenig 1920-180x

1999: (United States) Bruce Piatt 1920-185x

2000: (United States) Doug Koenig 1920-185x

2001: (United States) Doug Koenig 1920-184x

2002: (United States) Doug Koenig 1920-184x

2003: (United States) Doug Koenig 1920-183x

2004: (United States) Doug Koenig 1920-177x

2005: (United States) Doug Koenig 1920-185x

2006: (United States) Bruce Piatt 1920-177x

2007: (United States) Doug Koenig 1920-185x

2008: (United States) Doug Koenig 1918-185x

2009: (United States) Bruce Piatt 1920–181x

2010: (United States) Doug Koenig 1920-179x

2011: (United States) Doug Koenig *1920-187x (High Score)

2012: (United States) Doug Koenig 1920-182x

2013: (United States) Doug Koenig 1920-183x

2014: (United States) Kevin Angstadt 1920-171x

2015: (United States) Doug Koenig 1920-180x

2016: (United States) Doug Koenig 1920-183x

2017: (United States) Doug Koenig 1920-184x

2018: (United States) Adam Sokolowski 1920-176x

2019: (United States) Bruce Piatt 1920–179x

2020: (Cancelled)

2021: (United States) Doug Koenig 1920-182x

2022: (United States) Benito Martinez 1920-165x

==== CMP Bianchi Cup Champions ====
2023: (United States) Bruce Piatt 1920-178x

2024: (United States) Doug Koenig 1920-183x

2025: (United States) Bruce Piatt 1920-174X

==== Stock Firearm (Production) Champions ====
1994: (United States) Bruce Gray-Category Winner 1883-112x

1995: (United States) Rod Jones-Category Winner 1810-105x

1996: (United States) Bruce Gray-Category Winner 1889-125x

1997: (United States) Steve Sweeney-Category Winner 1850-115x

==== Production Class Champions ====
2009: (United States) Dave Sevigny 1806-101x

2010: (United States) Kyle Schmidt 1856-121x

2011: (United States) Rob Leatham 1883-132x (XD Tactical)

2012: (United States) Vance Schmid 1887-118x (CZ SP01 Shadow)

2013: (United States) Enoch Smith 1904-144x (Xdm 5.25)

2014: (United States) Rob Leatham 1884-132x (Xdm 5.25)

2015: (United States) Enoch Smith 1874-137x (Xdm 5.25)

2016: (United States) Adam Sokolowski 3767-257x* (Xdm 5.25) *Score reflects combined main match and championship match score

2017: (United States) Rob Leatham 1908-140x* (Xdm 5.25) *Score reflects championship match score only

2018: (United States) Patrick Franks 1894-136x

2019: (United States) Anthony Heinauer 1876-131x

2020: (Cancelled)

2021: (United States) Christopher Hudock 1888-116x

2022: (United States) Christopher Hudock 1900-135x

2023: (United States) Christopher Hudock 1901-128x

2024: (United States) Walker Buckman 1888-135x

2025: (United States) SFC Michael Gasser, USA 1841-110x

==== Production Optics Class champions ====
2021: (United States) Anthony Heinauer 1918-161x

2022: (United States) Anthony Heinauer 1914-164x

2023: (United States) Anthony Heinauer 1916-146x

2024: (United States) Christopher Hudock 1920-166x

2025: (United States) SSG Anthony Heinauer, USA 1916-152x

==== Metallic Sight Firearm Champions ====
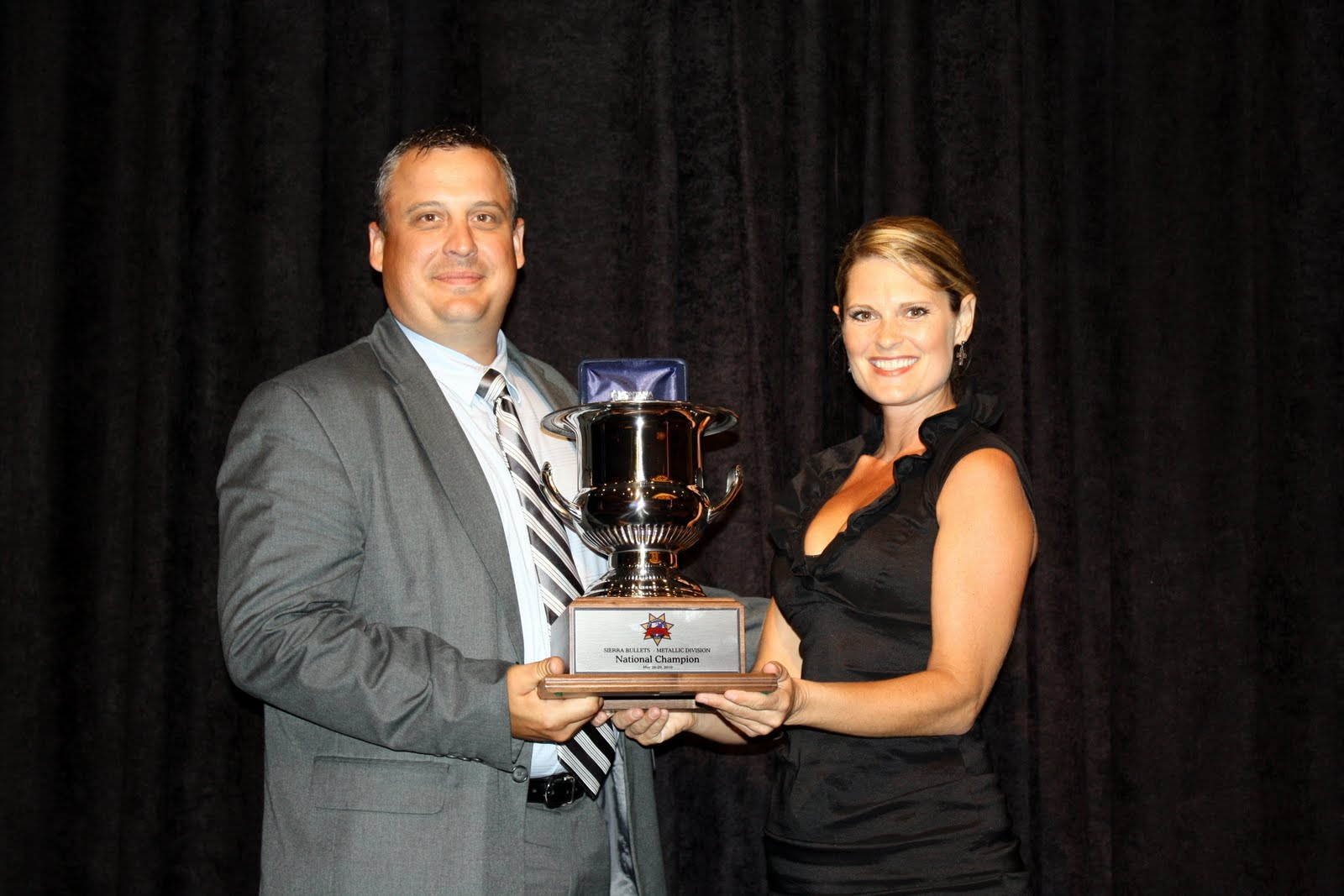
Kenda Lenseigne presents Robert Vadasz the 2010 Bianchi Cup Metallic Division Champion cup

1998: (United States) Chad Dietrich 1905-125x

1999: (United States) Fred Craig 1863-127x

2000: (United States) Rob Leatham 1897-145x

2001: (United States) Vance Schmid 1896-130x

2002: (United States) Rob Leatham 1884-136x

2003: (United States) Frederick Craig 1886-128x

2004: (United States) Rob Leatham 1905-144x

2005: (United States) Rob Leatham 1910-153x

2006: (United States) Rob Leatham 1902-145x

2007: (United States) Rob Leatham 1902-153x

2008: (United States) Rob Vadasz 1902-138x

2009: (United States) Rob Leatham 1909-145x

2010: (United States) Rob Vadasz 1904-146x

2011: (United States) Rob Vadasz 1908-143x

2012: (United States) Rob Vadasz 1878-135x

2013: (United States) Rob Vadasz 1892-132x

2014: (United States) Kevin Worrell 1907-127x

2015: (United States) Patrick Franks 1902-140x

2016: (United States) Patrick Franks 1901-140x

2017: (United States) Adam Sokolowski 1914-143x

2018: (United States) Rob Vadasz 1912-155x

2019: (United States) Kyle Schmidt 1905-137x

2020: (Cancelled)

2021: (United States) Rob Vadasz *1918-154x (High Score)

2022: (United States) Ryan Franks 1914-156x

2023: (United States) Ryan Franks 1914-141x

2024: (United States) Ryan Franks 1916-163x

2025: (United States) SFC Ryan Franks, USA 1,912-145x

==== National Action Pistol Women’s Champions ====
1980: (South Africa) Edith Almeida 1821-073x

1981: (South Africa) Edith Almeida 1652-045x

1982: (South Africa) Edith Almeida 1304-077x

1983: (United States) Sally Van Valzah 1765-091x

1984: (United States) Lee Cole 1761-096x

1985: (United States) Lee Cole 1957-119x

1986: (United States) Christie Rogers 1759-096x

1987: (Canada) Lorna Pavelka 1787-088x

1988: (United States) Christie Rogers 1836-111x

1989: (Japan) Yoko Shimomura 1882-129x

1990: (United States) Christie Rogers 1885-124x

1991: (Australia) Janina Tenace 1888-134x

1992: (Canada) Lorna Pavelka 1899-142x

1993: (United States) Judy Woolley 1898-148x

1994: (United States) Judy Woolley 1906-148x

1995: (Australia) Dewi Hazeltine 1908-150x

1996: (United States) Sharon Edington 1899-140x

1997: (United States) Sharon Edington 1906-142x

1998: (Australia) Anita Mackiewicz 1914-148x

1999: (United States) Vera Koo 1894-137x

2000: (Australia) Robyn Estreich 1902-157x

2001: (United States) Vera Koo 1910-137x

2002: (United States) Vera Koo 1905-151x

2003: (United States) Vera Koo 1894-141x

2004: (United States) Vera Koo 1886-136x

2005: (United States) Vera Koo 1894-149x

2006: (United States) Vera Koo 1897-143x

2007: (United States) Julie Goloski 1903-139x

2008: (United States) Vera Koo 1870-136x

2009: (United States) Julie Goloski Golob 1907-138x

2010: (United States) Jessie Abbate 1906-163x

2011: (United States) Jessie Harrison 1912-153x

2012: (United States) Julie Golob 1907-144x

2013: (United States) Jessie Duff 1893-142x

2014: (United States) Jessie Duff 1893-135x

2015: (Australia) Anita Mackiewicz *1916-166x (High Score)

2016: (New Zealand) Tiffany Piper 1904-154x

2017: (Australia) Cherie Blake 1904-145x

2018: (Australia) Anita Mackiewicz 1911-153x

2019: (Australia) Cherie Blake 1906-153x

2020: (Cancelled)

2021: (United States) Becky Yackley 1908-139x

2022: (United States) Sally Talbot 1913-155x

2023: (United States) Sally Talbot 1889-152x

2024: (Australia) Cherie Blake 1910-150x

2025: (Australia) Elyce Sutton 1910-149x

==== NRA World Action Pistol champions – open ====
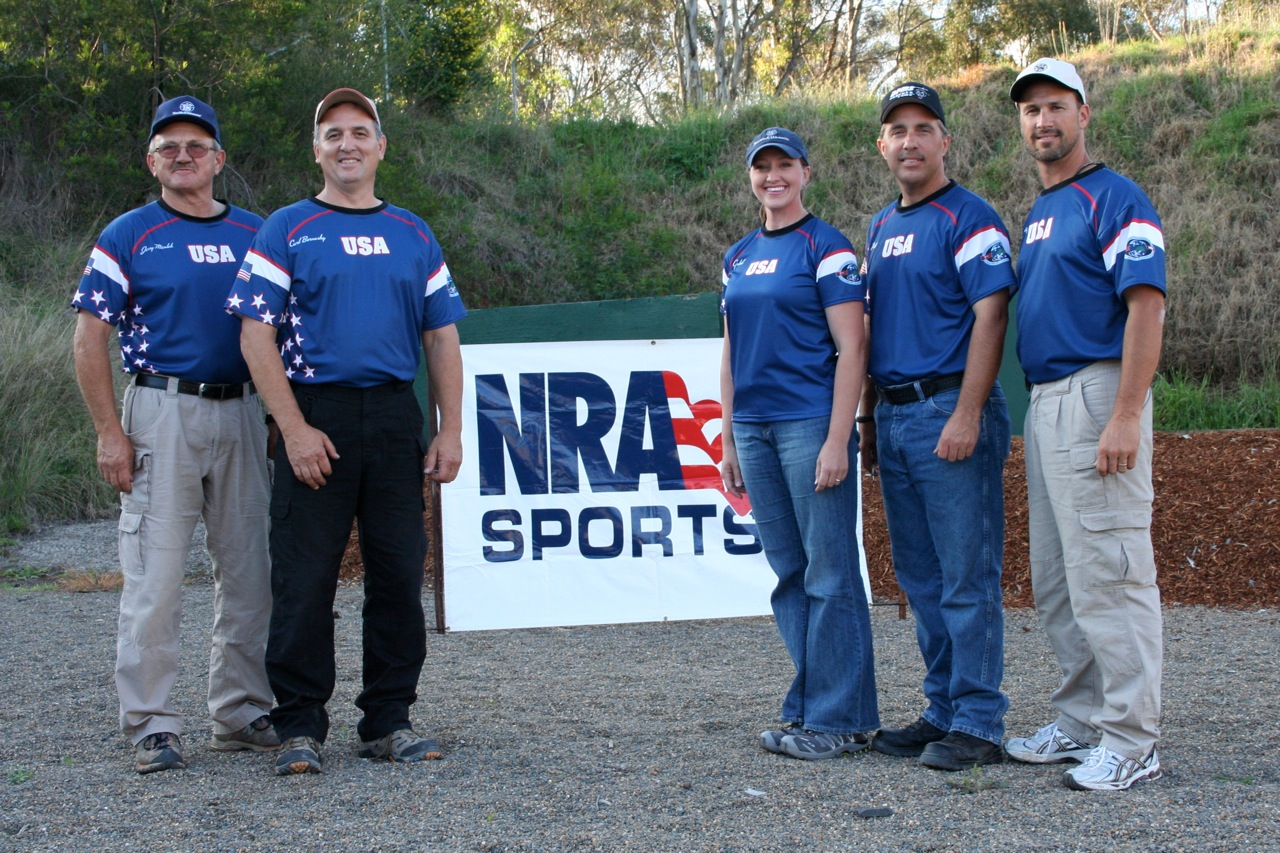
Pictured above at the 2010 World Action Pistol Championship are (from l. to r.) Jerry Miculek, Carl Bernosky, Julie Goloski-Golob, Bruce Piatt, and 2010 World Action Pistol Champion Doug Koenig

1994: (United States) John Pride 1920-174x

1997: (Australia) Adrian Hunter 1920-150x

1999: (United States) Doug Koenig 1920-180x

2004: (United States) Doug Koenig 1920-177x

2006: (United States) Bruce Piatt 1920-176x

2008: (United States) Doug Koenig 1920-181x

2010: (United States) Doug Koenig *1920-188x (High Score)

==== NRA World Action Pistol champions – Metallic ====
1994: N/A

1997: N/A

1999: N/A

2004: (United States) Jerry Miculek 1893-122x

2006: (Germany) Frank Reiche 1852-124x

2008: (United States) Vance Schmid *1902-133x (High Score)

2010: (Australia) Tony Drabsch 1887-125x

==== NRA World Action Pistol champions – Production ====
2010: (Germany) Marc Kleser 1839-109x

==== NRA World Action champions – Stock Gun ====
1999: United Kingdom

=== Multiple and consecutive Bianchi Cup champions ===
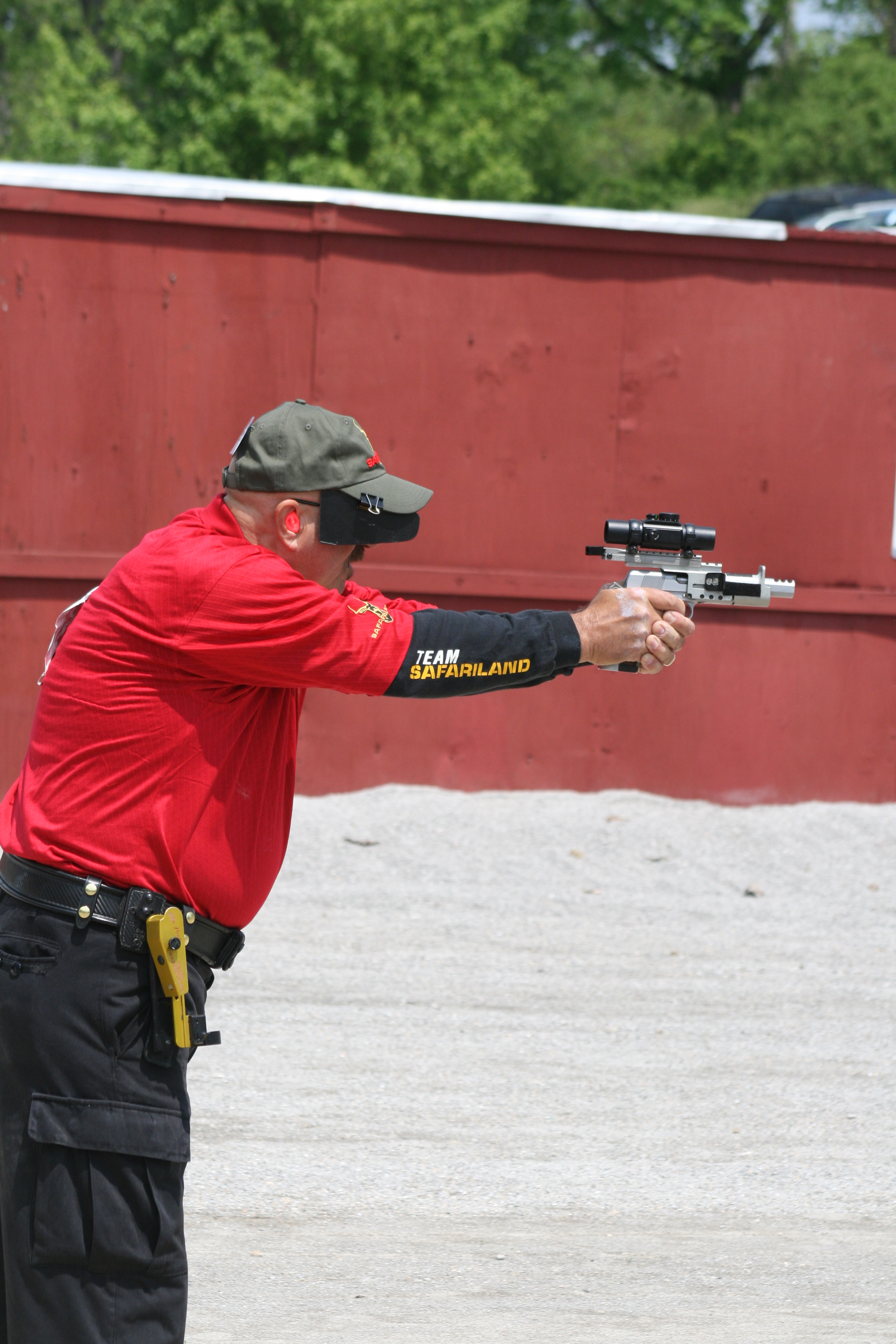
John Pride has several Bianchi titles under his belt

Country	Champion	Total	Years
(United States)	Doug Koenig	20	1990, 1992, 1998, 2000–2005, 2007–2008, 2010–2013, 2015–2017, 2021, 2024
(United States)	Bruce Piatt	8	1993, 1997, 1999, 2006, 2009, 2019, 2023, 2025
(United States)	Mickey Fowler	4	1980, 1981, 1982, 1996
(United States)	John Pride	4	1987, 1988, 1994, 1995
(United States)	Brian Enos	2	1983, 1984
(United States)	W. Riley Gilmore	2	1986, 1991

== See also ==
- Action Shooting
- Bianchi International
- International Practical Shooting Confederation
- National Rifle Association of America
- Steel Challenge
- United States Practical Shooting Association
