= Precision Rifle Series =

American shooting sport

Precision Rifle Series (U.S.)
- Abbreviation: PRS
- Type: Shooting sports organization
- Headquarters: United States
- Owner: Ken & Missy Wheeler
- Website: precisionrifleseries.com

Precision Rifle Series (PRS) is a long-range and precision rifle-based shooting sports organization. The Precision Rifle Series is recognized as the leading organizing body for local, regional, national, and international precision rifle matches, including comprehensive score tracking and competitive structure. The number of active competitors has increased from 164 in 2012 to over 20,000 by 2025.

The competition seeks to find a balance between speed and precision, and targets can both have known (KD) and unknown distances (UKD). Shooting distances can vary from between 10 and 1,200 meters or yards, and thus the competitor needs to have good knowledge of their firearm's ballistics. The primary focus is on long range shooting, and a competition usually consists of several courses of fire. Each course usually has a set maximum time (par time), and the shooter is awarded points according to how many targets they manage to hit during that time. Targets presented are usually relatively small and made of steel to simplify scoring. In the PRS-series for instance, usually between 0.3–0.9 mrad (30–90 mm at 100 m, or approximately 1–3 MOA).

== Rifles ==
Long range sniper-style rifle matches at various ranges from unconventional shooting positions became popular in the 1990s. PRS rules established in 2012 stipulated rifles used by competing shooters must fire bullets with a diameter not greater than 7.82 millimetres (0.308 in) at muzzle velocities not greater than 980 m/s (3,200 ft/s). These limits are intended to prolong the life of the steel targets used in matches. There are six competitive categories for rifles firing such bullets.

Most competitors use variable-magnification telescopic sights. Cartridges firing 6 mm or 6.5 mm (0.24 to 0.26 inch caliber) bullets are popular because low recoil often enables shooters to observe whether they have hit or missed a target to assess whether another shot is required before moving on to the next target. Many competitors also use shooting bags to create a stable platform to rest their rifles.

== Divisions ==
Bolt-action rifles - Divisions, Categories and Classifications rifles:

The PRS has three bolt gun divisions and one gas gun division. All shooters must declare the division in which they will be competing when they register for the PRS. Shooters are permitted to shoot in multiple divisions in the same season. They however, must register for all divisions in which they choose to compete. It is imperative for shooters to ensure they are registered in the correct division for all matches if they plan on competing in multiple divisions. It is the shooter’s responsibility to ensure they are scored in the correct division. Failure to do so will result in a match disqualification (DQ).

- Open Division
  - Bolt action rifles in the Open Division do not exceed a caliber of 7.62 mm (.30 inch) bore or a velocity of 980 m/s (3,200 ft/s).
- Tactical Division
  - Bolt action tactical rifles in the Tactical Division are restricted to .308 Winchester and 5.56 NATO/.223 Remington cartridges. The 5.56 NATO/.223 Remington must not exceed 910 m/s (3,000 ft/s) and the .308 Winchester must not exceed 850 m/s (2,800 ft/s). No modified or wildcat cartridges are permitted to compete in the Bolt Action Tactical Rifles Division.
- Production Division
  - Bolt action production rifles in the Production Division shall not exceed $3,000 as listed on the company's website and the optic shall not exceed $2,500 as listed on the company's website.
  - For the purpose of the Production Division, a rifle is defined as a publicly available rifle per the original manufacturer's configuration of a complete firearm which will be composed of at least the following: stock with bottom metal or chassis, a complete action, a barrel and a trigger mechanism.
- Gas Gun Division
  - Gas gun division rifles may consist of a large or small frame semi-auto rifle without restrictions. Gas guns are limited to a caliber of 7.62 mm (.30 inch) bore or 980 m/s (3,200 ft/s).

All competitors shoot the same course of fire regardless of their registered division. Competitors are given a 1% variance on speed for environmental factors and equipment discrepancies

== Shooter categories ==
- Military and law enforcement
  - Any shooter who is a full time military active duty service member or full time law enforcement officer (LEO) is eligible to shoot in the Mil/LE class in addition to their PRS division. Full and/or part time national guard or military reserve competitive shooting teams that are sanctioned by their respective military branches qualify to compete under the MIL/LE PRS category.
- Ladies
  - All female shooters are eligible to shoot in the ladies category in addition to their PRS Division.
- Seniors
  - Anyone over the age of 55 is eligible to shoot in the seniors category in addition to their PRS Division.
- Junior
  - Anyone 18 years old or younger at the start of the season is eligible to shoot in the juniors category in addition to their PRS Division.
- International
  - Any international shooter (not a resident of the US) that chooses to compete in the US/CA PRS PRO Series. Not to be confused with the International Series, a shooter may participate in both.

== Classifications ==
In order for shooters to be able to compete with their peers, PRS Series competitors are divided into classifications based upon their skill level and performance. The reason for the classification system is to have the ability to rank competitors and allow shooters to have true peer-to-peer recognition. This allows for goal setting and realistic achievement of attainable goals within the sport.

The classification system is a yearly performance-based system in which shooters are classed for the current season based on their year prior season series score (not including their finale score). At the end of each season, shooters classes will be recalculated according to the classification bracket percentages based on their end of season pre-finale series score. The shooter will retain this classification for the entire next season and compete within this classification at the Pro Series Finale (if qualified).

PRS competitors can achieve a classification of either Pro, Semi-pro, Marksman, or Amateur. Each class consists of a percentage of the total number of affiliated shooters, based on the end of season standings not including the finale. Pro shooters, for example, will be classified as the top 20% of competitors according to the standings after the last Pro Series match of the season. Competitors within the top 55 -79.9% of shooters, based on these standings will be classified as Semi-pro and so on.

PRO Series classification bracket percentages
Classification	Percentages
Professional	Top 20%
Semi-professional	Next 25%
Marksman	Next 25%
Amateur	Remaining competitors (approx. 30%)

== Affiliations ==
The Precision Rifle Series has affiliated clubs in numerous countries, with clubs in Australia, the Baltic States, Hungary, Indonesia, Italy, Mexico, Mongolia, Poland, Slovakia, South Africa, Spain, Ukraine, the United Kingdom and Zimbabwe, among others.

== Seasons ==
2019 champions
Name	Division
Clay Blackketter	Open
Coldyn Cloud	Open Junior
Regina Milkovich	Open Lady
Ben Gossett	Mil/LEO
Brian Allen	Open Senior
Charles Roberts	Tactical
Doug Koenig	Production

2020 champions
Name	Division
Austin Orgain	Open
Allison Zane	Open Junior
Allison Zane	Open Lady
Ben Gossett	Mil/LEO
Rick Reeves	Open Senior
Mark Cooper	Tactical
Doug Koenig	Production

== PRS Armageddon Gear Cup Series ==
Any PRO series shooter that chooses to purchase a PRS AG Series membership and desires to participate in the series may compete in this category. There is no change to the PRS PRO Series, Qualifiers, or Finale with the addition to the AG Category. The two Series are nested to allow all shooters to either participate and/or be a co-participant of this aspirational series. The PRS will select 8-10 matches that are already designated Pro Series Qualifiers and add PRS AG CUP requirements (cash payout, minor additional scoring for MDs). These matches will count points for the PRO Series & the PRS AG Cup Series for those that choose the appropriate membership. Just like other PRS matches, PRS PRO Series/AG Cup Series Qualifiers do not require membership to shoot.

To be eligible for selection for the AG Cup and AG Cup qualifier payouts, shooters must be a PRS PRO Series member and a PRS AG Cup Series Member. AG Cup match registration fees will be collected by the MD during the registration of the top 75 invited shooters. To be eligible for an invitation to the AG Cup, shooters must have three scores from three AG Cup Qualifier matches during the season. Shooters in any PRS division may compete within the AG Cup Series, but their AG Series division points will be calculated as an open score so that they are comparable to all shooters in the AG division.

- Example:
  - John Smith shoots in Tactical Division.
  - His raw match score is 85 points.
  - He earns 100 PRS points in the Tactical division as the highest scoring
- Tactical shooter at the match.
  - The 1st place Open division shooter at the match has a raw score of 98.
  - John Smith’s AG division points will be calculated as an Open division score earning 85/98 = 86.734 PRS Points in the AG Division.

PRS AG Cup qualifier match selection will be based on regional locations, match quality/size, and PRS AG Cup standards will be added to the match.

PRS AG Cup qualifiers require the MD to collect an additional match fee (on top of their standard match fee). 100% of the additional match fee will be applied to the payout for AG Cup Series members shooting the match.

If an AG Cup Series member chooses not to “buy up” for a select AG cup series match then only PRS PRO series points/placement will be awarded, but no payout or points the AG series will be awarded.

Like the PRO Series, shooters may shoot in as many AG CUP qualifiers as they like but only the top three scores from AG Cup qualifiers will count toward AG CUP standings. After the qualifiers are complete the top 75 get invited to the AG CUP.

The AG CUP will be held each winter separate from the PRS PRO series finale.

The AG Cup will run as a 3-day event. Invites will be extended to the top 75 shooters in the PRS AG Division who have shot 3 AG Qualifiers during the season. The top 75 shooters will first compete in a traditional 20 stage 2-day match. The top 10 shooters from the 2-day portion will move on to day 3. An additional 5 shooters will also move on to day 3 based on the total of their 2-day percentage score (40%) and their season AG points (60%). AG Cup winners will be awarded cash winnings and AG Cup trophies by Armageddon Gear at the AG Cup.

== See also ==
- International T-Class Confederation (ITCC), another international precision rifle shooting organisation
- International Confederation of Fullbore Rifle Associations (ICFRA), the international shooting organisation for Palma and F-Class
