= Jerry Barnhart =

American sport shooter

Personal information
- National team: USA
Medal record
IPSC
Representing United States
IPSC Handgun World Shoot
Silver medal – second place	1986 Florida
Silver medal – second place	1990 Adelaide
Silver medal – second place	1996 Brasilia	Open
IPSC US Handgun Championship
Gold medal – first place	1987
Silver medal – second place	1989
Gold medal – first place	1990
Silver medal – second place	1991
Gold medal – first place	1992
Gold medal – first place	1996	Open
Gold medal – first place	1999	Open

Jerry Barnhart is an American sport shooter and firearms instructor with three individual silver medals from the IPSC Handgun World Shoots (1986, 1990 and 1996), and has been team member of the U.S. gold winning team six times. He is also ten times national champion with 5 US IPSC Championship titles and 5 USPSA Handgun Nationals titles, and three time Steel Challenge World Speed Shooting Champion (1998, 1991 and 1987).
