= Dry fire =

"Firing" of a projectile weapon (such as a firearm) without loaded ammunition

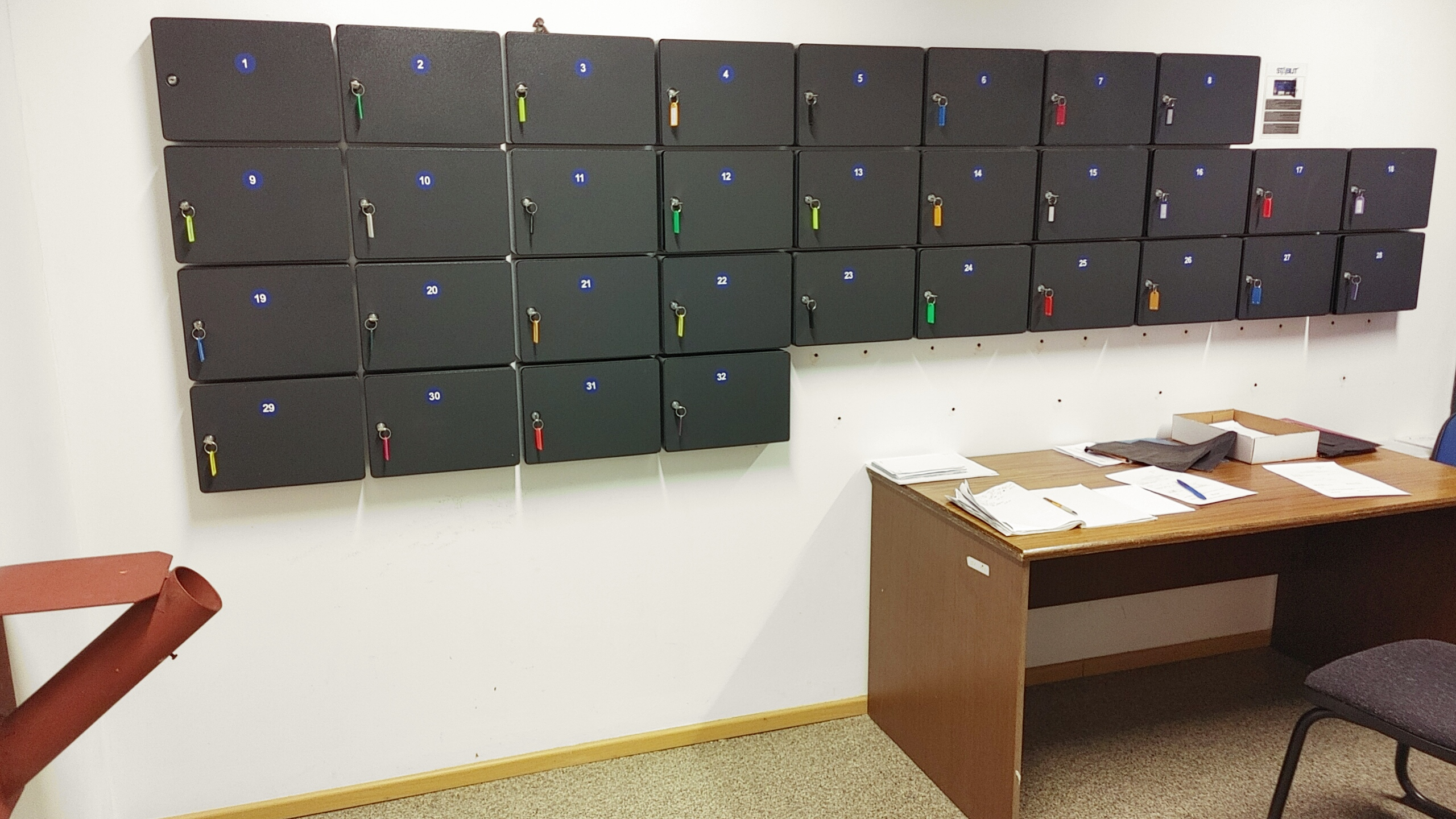
Gun storage boxes for civilian visitors at a courthouse in Prague, Czech Republic. Before storing, the gun is aimed at the gun clearing trap (left, red), it is unloaded and dry fired. The bullet trap is constructed so as to safely contain a fired bullet in case the operator mistakenly left a round in the chamber. Loading of firearm when leaving is also conducted while aiming into the bullet trap, without engaging trigger.

Dry firing is the act of activating the shooting mechanism of a bow, crossbow, firearm, airgun or other ranged weapons without actually launching out any projectiles. Dry firing an archery bow is heavily discouraged, as it can do significant structural damage to the bow, and this is especially true for crossbows. The expression is also used to refer to any weapons training and tactical engagement simulation that does not involve live firing of ammunitions.

Dry firing is most commonly done with firearms, and can be performed by simply cocking an unloaded gun and then actuating the trigger to release the sear. It is however recommended to dry-fire using something to cushion the firing pin strike, such as a dummy round, a fake ammunition (commercially known as a "snap cap"), or simply the empty casing of a spent cartridge. There are also methods of interactive dry firing, usually with a laser pointer/infrared light gun training platform such as an iMarksman or SIRT (Shot Indicating Resetting Trigger) training pistol, and may also include the use of a target feedback system, such as the iDryfire or LASR software.

== Purpose ==
The primary purpose of dry firing is weapons training, particularly to practise form and kinematics of trigger pull for better precisions (such as in shooting sports) as well as troubleshooting of firearm malfunctions during rifle, shotgun and handgun shooting. Dry firing is also performed in gunsmithing to test the working conditions of the action in an accurized or customized gun.

There are some benefits from the dry firing of contemporary fireams. Learning is safer with dry fire, and it's easier to condition muscle memories of trigger control without developing a flinch, which is a pre-emptive reflex some beginners tend to have due to anticipation to a recoil or being unaccustomed to the trigger weight. Dry firing also allows shooters to practice trigger control in locations where they can't use live ammo legally or practically, such as at home or in outdoor sites that are not up to the safery standards of shooting ranges. Grip, drawing, sight alignment, trigger control, reloads, troubleshooting malfunctions, and more can be trained during dry fire practice, which allow people to conduct a safe, convenient and cheap (as live ammo are consumables that cost money to reprocure or reload after used) form of training to improve shooting skills.

In recent years, a number of companies have developed methods of enhancing dry fire practice to improve skills. Products that illuminate a laser beam, as opposed to a solid projectile, have become increasingly popular. These include chamber inserts available for various caliber firearms, as well as dedicated training pistols or replacement AR-15 bolt carrier groups. There are also a number of target systems for these laser dry fire training aides, that are becoming more affordable and popular. These products help people get more from dry fire practice by providing feedback on shot placement and times, and make dry fire a more enjoyable experience. In addition, there are training aids such as training cards that provide shooters a variety of drills to do that will help them develop skills that will carry over to live fire.

== Potential damages to weapons ==
=== In archery ===
In the context of archery, dry firing or "dry loosing" refers to the releasing of a drawn bow or crossbow without a nocked or loaded arrow or bolt. This can be exceptionally hazardous to the weapon, as the force which would otherwise be used to drive the projectile (arrow or bolt) is instead absorbed by the weapon's frame. This practice is often heavily discouraged, as without the mass of the projectile to absorb the elastic energy released, the energy is instead dissipated through vibration of the bowstring and the bow limbs, and can do significant structural damage to the bow itself. Compound bows are particularly susceptible to damage due to high tension and numerous moving parts. Dry firing a modern high-energy compound bow even once may cause a combination of cracked limbs, bent axles, string derailment, cam warpage, string/cable failure, cable slide failure, and can even cause the bow to shatter. While some bows can survive a dry fire with no apparent damage, typically manufacturers do not warrant their bows for dry firing, and any bow that has been dry fired needs to be thoroughly inspected for damage before shooting again. In particular, the limbs of a compound bow need to be inspected for cracking around cam axles and the opening of the slot where the cams or pulleys fit in (since they tend to tilt sideways during a dry fire).

Crossbows, with even higher draw weights, are even more likely to be damaged by dry firing.

=== In firearms ===
Concern is commonly expressed by firearms manufacturers and gunsmiths that dry firing might damage certain firearms.

It is generally considered acceptable to dry fire centerfire firearms for limited volume training, although older designs such as the CZ 52 and Colt Single Action Army are exceptions. This is because firing pins are designed for axial momentum transfers via the tip impacting a primer, and dry-firing a firing pin into an empty chamber means that the decelerative impulse is mostly handled by protrusions or flanges on the pin (usually at the rear) catching the inside of the bolt, which conveys an eccentric tensile/shearing shock instead of an axial compressive one, leaving parts of the pin more vulnerable to wears due to repeated, concentrated stresses and material fatigues. Ultimately, one should check with the manufacturer of the gun to ascertain if it is safe to dry fire, but dummy rounds, snap caps, a BarrelBlok or simply spent casings with inert primers should be used for all high-volume dry fire training.

Although dry firing does not pose any real risk of damage to most modern centerfire firearms, it can certainly pose a risk for rimfire guns, where the firing pin are inherent designed to impact the barrel's breech face (normally with the cartridge rim crushed in-between to cushion the impact) when the weapon is fired. Unless the gun's tolerances and machining is so precise that the pin stops just short of contacting the breech — which is extremely difficult to achieve and maintain — dry-firing a rimfire gun with an empty chamber means that the firing pin will most likely impact the breech bluntly, potentially damaging either side or both. Because of this, precautions (such as the use of plastic or rubber snap caps) are recommended if a rimfire weapon is to be deliberately dry-fired.

== Laser systems ==
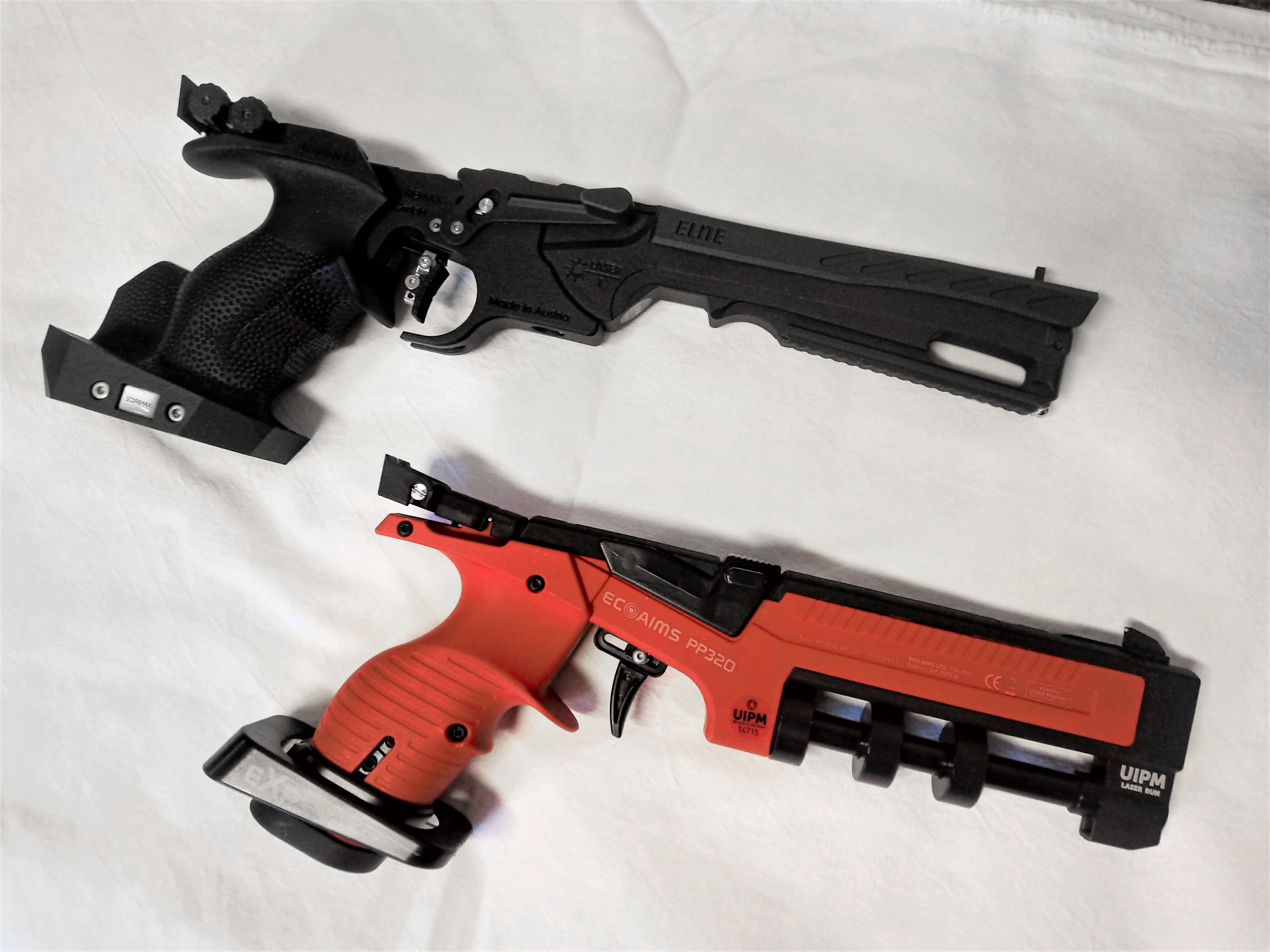
Two laser pistols.

Some dummy cartridges are equipped with a laser beam (laser cartridge), usually with a red, green or infrared beam so that they can simulate the point of impact. There are also camera systems or other types of sensors to detect hits so that competitions can be simulated. Special laser weapons or firearm conversion kits with or without simulated recoil are also available. Some examples of commercial laser training systems are iMarksman, TTRIGGER, SIRT, iDryfire, LASR (Laser Activated Shot Reporter), MantisX, LaserLyte, Laser Ammo, LaserHIT or SCATT. Some examples of open source solutions ShootOFF and HomeLESS.

=== Laser colors ===
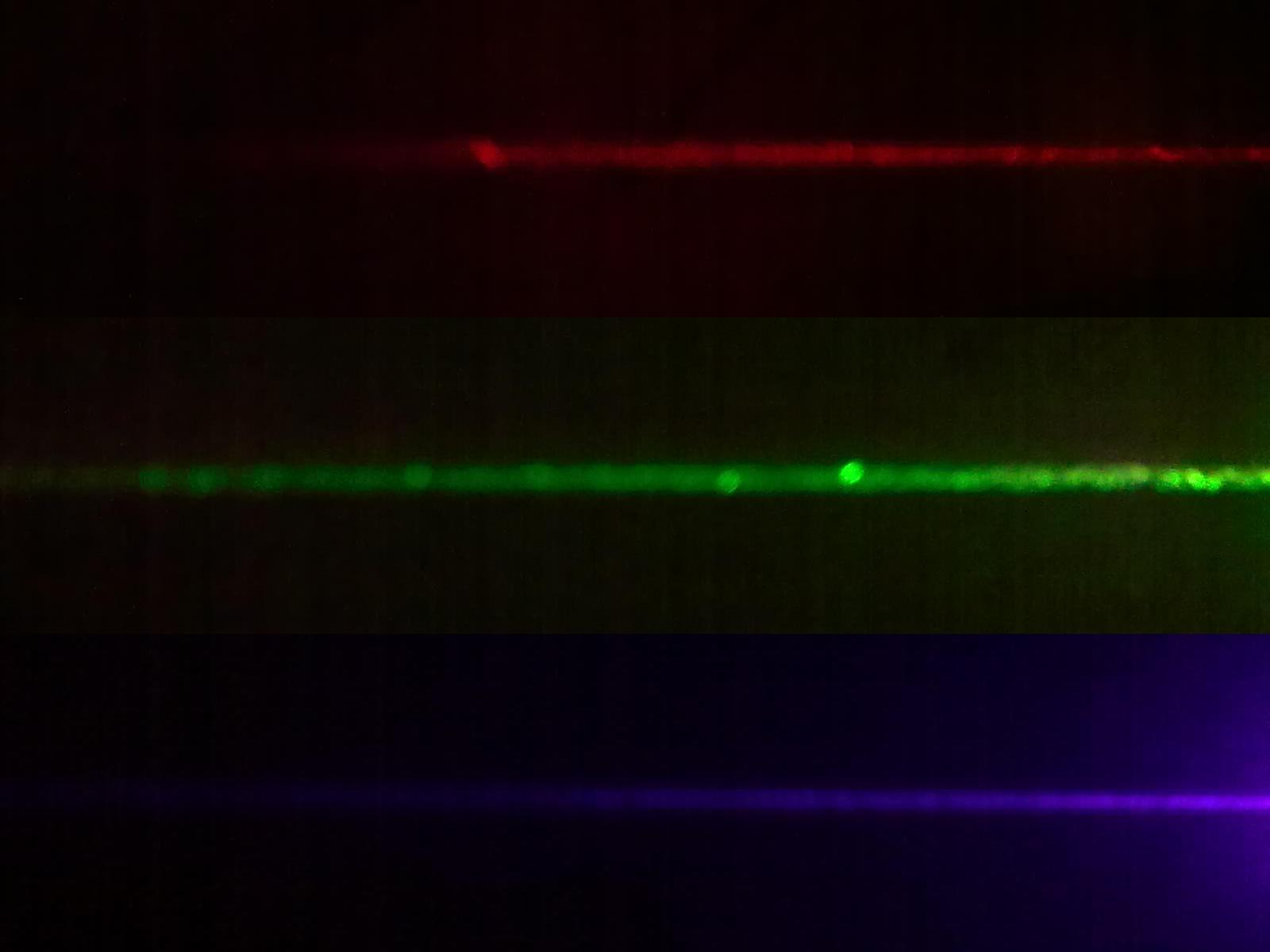
Laser beams: Red (650 nm) 100 mW, green (532 nm) 50 mW, and violet (405 nm) 150 mW.

Laser systems can have different technical solutions which are not necessarily compatible. The power of the laser beam is typically around 1-5 mW. The color of the laser is typically either green (520 nm wavelength), red (630-670 nm) or infrared (780 nm, invisible). Red and green lasers can be captured by most ordinary cameras, while special camera may be needed to capture infrared lasers since most ordinary cameras have an infrared filter.

The SIRT (Shot Indicating Resetting Trigger) models from Next Level Training were one of the first major manufacturers of pistol dry training systems, and since then similar products have also been offered by many other manufacturers. Some laser systems have several lasers in the same unit. One such example is the SIRT 110, which has one laser (take-up laser, can be deactivated) that lights up as long as the trigger is pressed past the reset point, and another laser (shot indicator) that lights up after the trigger has been fully triggered and as long as it is held. These two laser beams are supplied by SIRT in combination red/red or red/green respectively, and on the red/green variant the color mapping can be changed by the user with a button. There are also laser modules on the aftermarket so that the SIRT 110 can be converted to other laser colors (infrared/red, meaning that one laser is invisible) for use with an infrared camera that captures wavelengths between 780-940 nm. Using two different laser beams means that a camera system can capture movements in the weapon before and after the shot is fired. Laser pistols used in modern pentathlon have been standardised to have red lasers with a wavelength of 635 to 650 nm.

=== Pulse duration ===
Square pulse of a signal turned on and off

The pulse duration of the laser is measured in milliseconds (ms), and is important for correct detection by target or camera systems. Some systems have user-adjustable pulse lengths. With purely electromechanical dryfire cartridges the duration of the pulse is often mechanically controlled by the firing pin and typically lies around 100 ms, while some other systems have digitally controlled pulses that are shorter, for example 60 ms or 1 ms. These may be required for camera or target systems to be able to correctly detect single shots, and stands in contrast to laser systems that emit a continuous laser beam as long as the trigger is held, such as the SIRT 110. There are also aftermarket conversion kits or pulse modules to convert some laser systems to emit a distinct pulse for use with particular target systems. For example, one manufacturer offers an aftermarket module that is required for use with their target systems, and has a stated pulse duration of 65 ms. Another manufacturer offers a pulse module that emits a 30 ms pulse with each trigger pull, and claims that it works with target systems from both LASR, Laser Ammo and LaserLyte. Laser pistols used in modern pentathlon have been standardised since 2014 to having a pulse length of 15.6 ms. Before 2014 the pulse length was standardised to 25.2 ms. Laser systems for use with simulated recoil have a very short pulse (in the order of magnitude 6-8 milliseconds) to ensure that the point of impact is not affected too much by the movement in the firearm. This can require the use of high-speed cameras (for example 200 fps), since many ordinary web and phone cameras don't have a quick enough frame rate.

== Etymology ==
Recorded from the 1980s, the term "dry fire" was possibly coined as analogous to the phrase "dry run", which is a rehearsal or testing process and in the case of the firearm, one is "testing" the trigger action and observing the hammer or striker drop, without using live ammunition. For the expression of "dry run", it has been suggested that the "dry" originates from exhibitions by late-19th-century fire departments in the United States, where drills (runs) were conducted for public viewing without the use of water (dry).

== See also ==
- Drill purpose rifle
- Glossary of archery terms
- Glossary of firearms terms
- Gun safety
- Hang fire
