= Weapons training =

Weapons training may refer to:

- Firearm-related education and training
  - Blank (cartridge)
  - Bullseye shooting
  - Drill purpose rifle
  - Dummy round
  - Gun safety
  - History of the firearm
  - Shooting range
  - Shooting sports
- Martial arts
  - Kata
  - Kobudō
- Military education and training
  - Military exercise
  - Military recruit training
  - Tactical engagement simulation
  - Weapon effects simulation
- Professional wargaming
- MilSim
  - Laser tag
  - Paintball
- "Weapons Training", a 1970 poem by Bruce Dawe

== See also ==
- Training weapon (disambiguation)
