= Good Form =

Good Form may refer to:

- Good Form (Once Upon a Time)
- "Good Form" (song), by Nicki Minaj

== See also ==
- Form (exercise)
- Principles of grouping § Good form
