= Cowboy shooting =

Cowboy shooting may refer to:

- Cowboy Action Shooting
- Cowboy Mounted Shooting
