= Gun safety =

Study and practice of safe operation of firearms

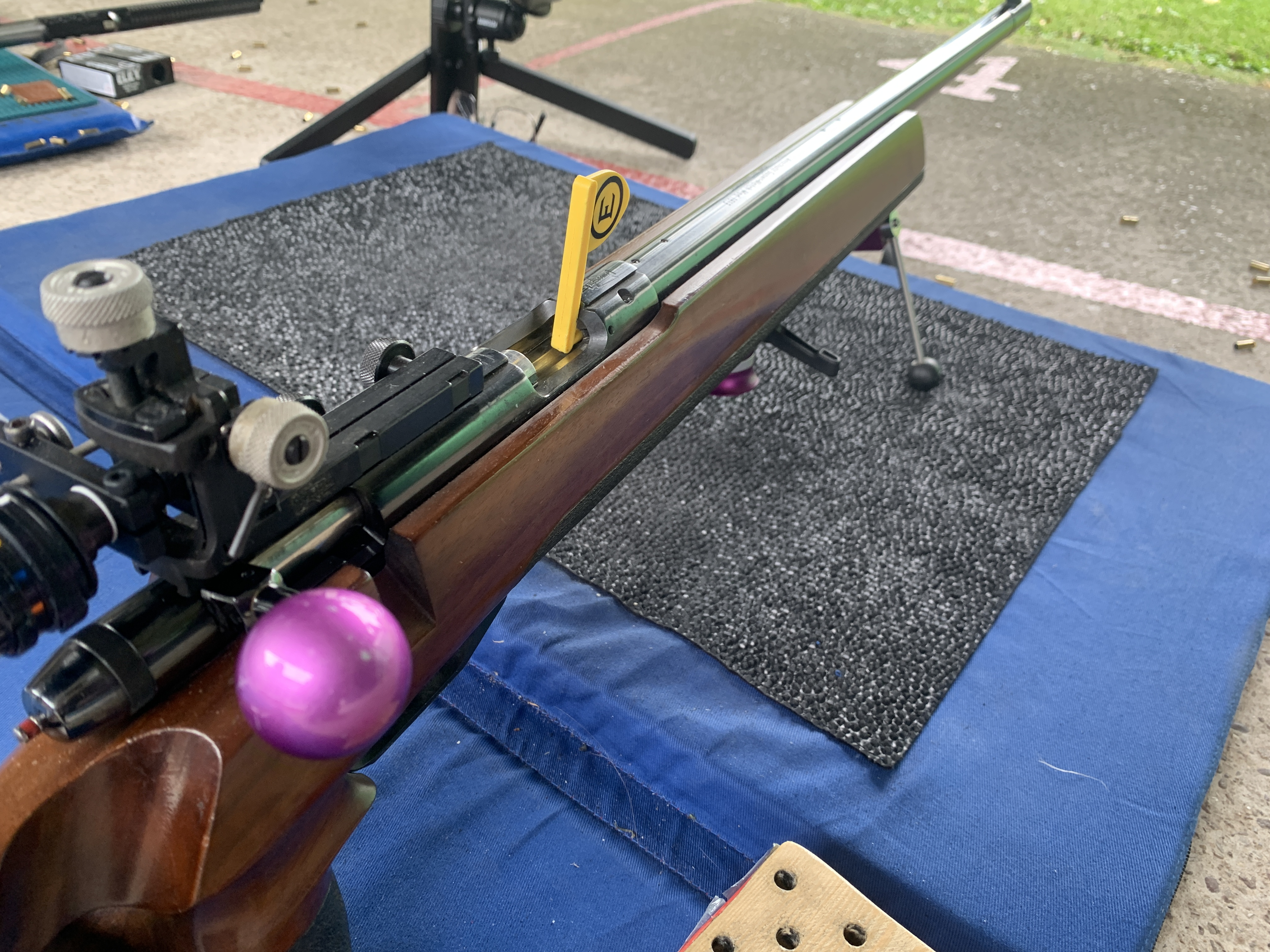
A yellow flag demonstrates the rifle's bolt is open and the breech is clear.

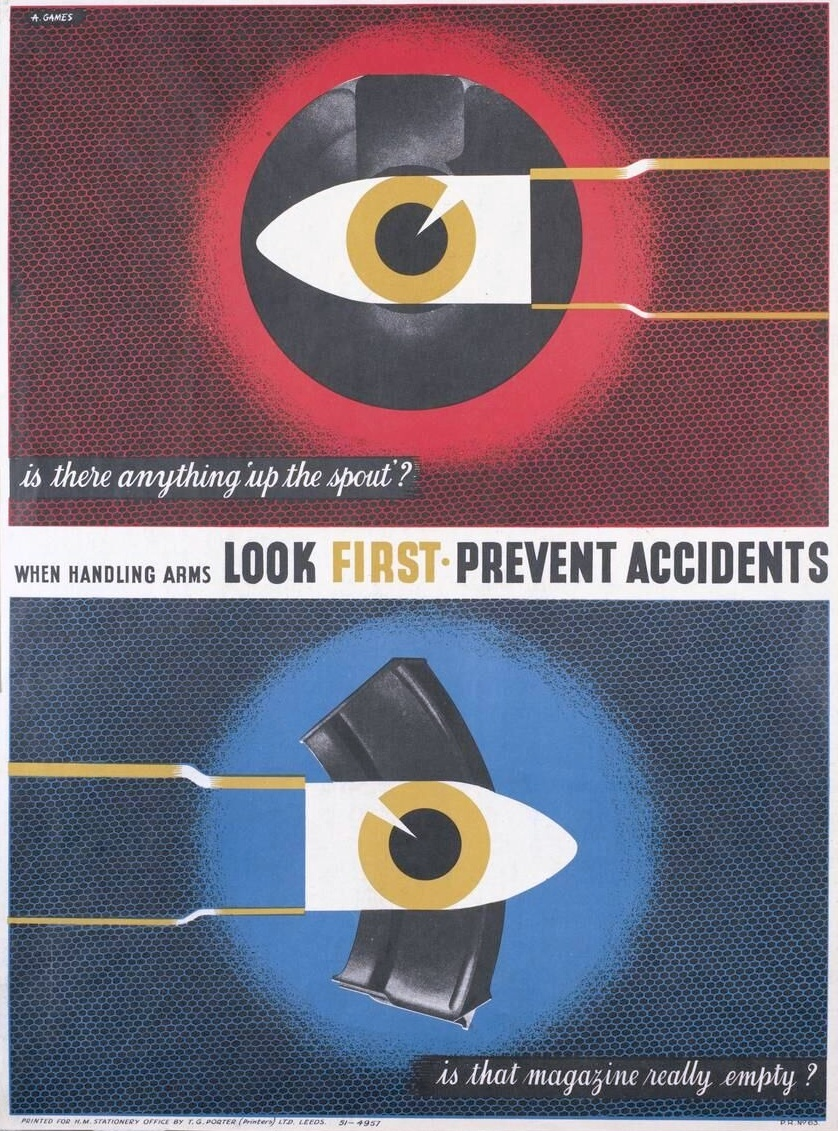
Firearm handling safety poster

Gun safety is the study and practice of managing risk when using, handling, transporting, storing and disposing of firearms, air guns, and ammunition in order to avoid injury, illness, or death.

Gun safety includes the training of users, the design of firearms, as well as the formal and informal regulation of gun production, distribution, and usage. This includes mishaps like accidental discharge, negligent discharge, and firearm malfunctions, as well as secondary risks like hearing loss, lead poisoning from bullets, and pollution from other hazardous materials in propellants and cartridges.

== History ==
Accidental explosions of stored gunpowder date to the 13th century in Yangzhou, China. Early handheld muskets using matchlock or wheel lock mechanisms were limited by poor reliability and the risk of accidental discharge, which was improved somewhat by the introduction of the flintlock, though unintentional firing continued to be a serious drawback. Percussion caps, introduced in the 1820s, were more reliable, and by 1830 security pins had been designed to prevent accidental discharges.

Trigger guards, grip safeties and integrated trigger safety represent further iterations on the various safeties built into modern firearms to prevent discharge from dropping, or without positive and deliberate manipulation of the trigger.

As mechanical reliability improved, human error became a more significant cause of harm. In 1902, the English politician and game shooting enthusiast Mark Hanbury Beaufoy wrote some much-quoted verses on gun safety, known as "A Father's Advice" or "The Beaufoy Verses" meant to instill safe practices in his son. Various similar sayings have since been popularized.

There were 47,000 unintentional firearm deaths worldwide in 2013.

== Overview ==
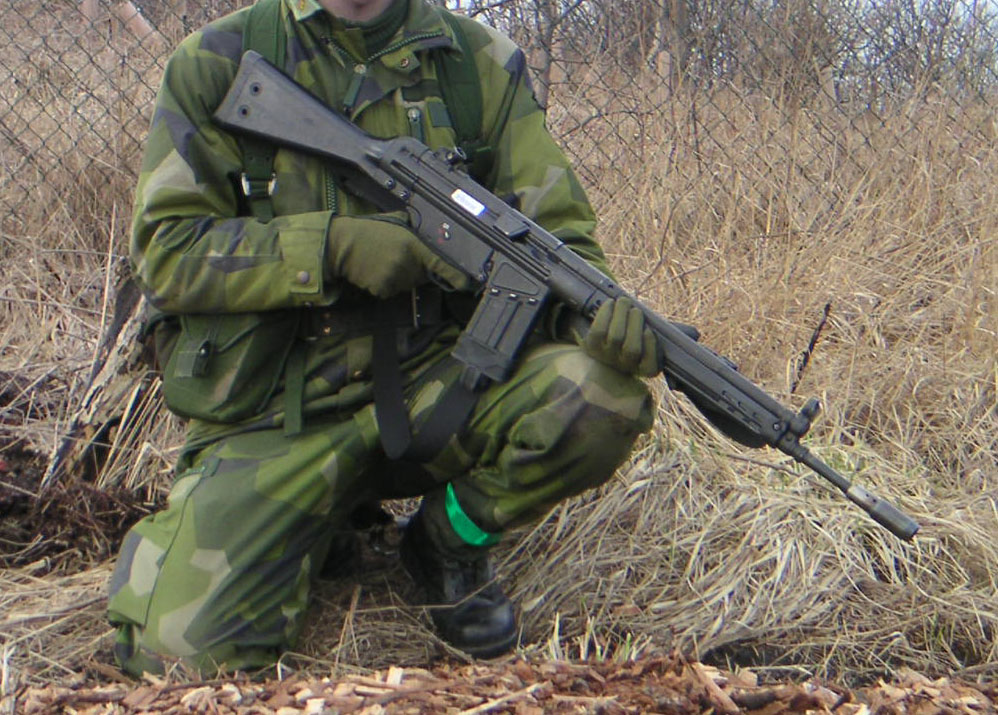
Example of safe firearm handling. The firearm is pointed at the ground and the handler's finger is off the trigger.

Most firearm safety relates to management of human factors. This includes training to mitigate unsafe handling, as well as restricting physical access to firearms by untrained or unfit persons (such as unsupervised children). Handling practices and doctrines necessarily vary between use cases with additional mechanical and procedural mitigations implemented as required.

Environmental hazards such as lead exposure and noise pollution are managed via shooting range design, maintenance procedures, and the use of personal protective equipment (PPE).

Firearm safety practices are built around the Swiss cheese model, such that potential harm caused by a malfunction or a lapse in handling is mitigated (or prevented entirely) by other safety practices. For instance, use of an unloading facility ensures that if a procedural error is made during unloading and a round remains chambered, the resulting discharge when the handler eases springs is captured by a safe backstop.

== Training ==
A leading cause of accidents with firearms results from unsafe handling due to ignorance or negligence.

Role-specific training varies in nature, although a few common principles underpin most doctrines including:

- Trigger discipline
- Muzzle discipline
- Separation of firearm and ammunition whenever the firearm is not directly in use

Where firearms must be carried loaded (such as by law enforcement and military personnel), training and periodic re-qualification is particularly important as a control against unintentional discharge. Emphasis is often placed on loading and unloading practices as well as mechanical considerations such as holster design, and integrated trigger safety catches.

Jeff Cooper, an influential figure in US firearms training, formalized and popularized "Four Rules" of safe firearm handling.

Other lists of gun safety rules include as few as three basic safety rules or as many as ten rules including broader range safety and sporting etiquette rules. Such rulesets often include activity-specific best practice for niches including defensive use, hunting, and range or target shooting. Many organisations provide similar sets of rules. While universal rules provide a foundation, localized safety manuals for civilians often integrate these with practical maintenance and tactical awareness guidelines to ensure safe handling in diverse environments.

In addition to basic safe handling practices, training includes identification and immediate actions to handle faults such as misfires and squib rounds that could lead to dangerous mishaps such as a barrel failure or breech explosion.

== Storage ==
Proper storage prevents both damage and the unauthorized use or theft of firearms and ammunition.

Where a full cabinet is not practicable, locks may be used to prevent the firearm being loaded or discharged.

=== Gun cabinets ===
A gun safe or gun cabinet is commonly used to physically prevent access to firearms, magazines, and ammunition. Various standards like the British Standard BS 7558:1992 or the California DOJ criteria define minimum requirements to qualify a container as a firearm storage device.

Local laws may mandate or simply recommend use of a cabinet for storage, and may require that cabinets meet a particular standard. Some jurisdictions require that ammunition is stored separately to the firearm. Some jurisdictions may require that main components of the firearm such as the bolt, is stored separately to the firearm, effectively deactivating it.

Many small safes sold as suitable for handguns have been found not to meet standards by independent researchers and professional hackers. Locking mechanism plays an important role in overall safety of the small safe.

Handloaders must take special precautions for storing primers and powders.

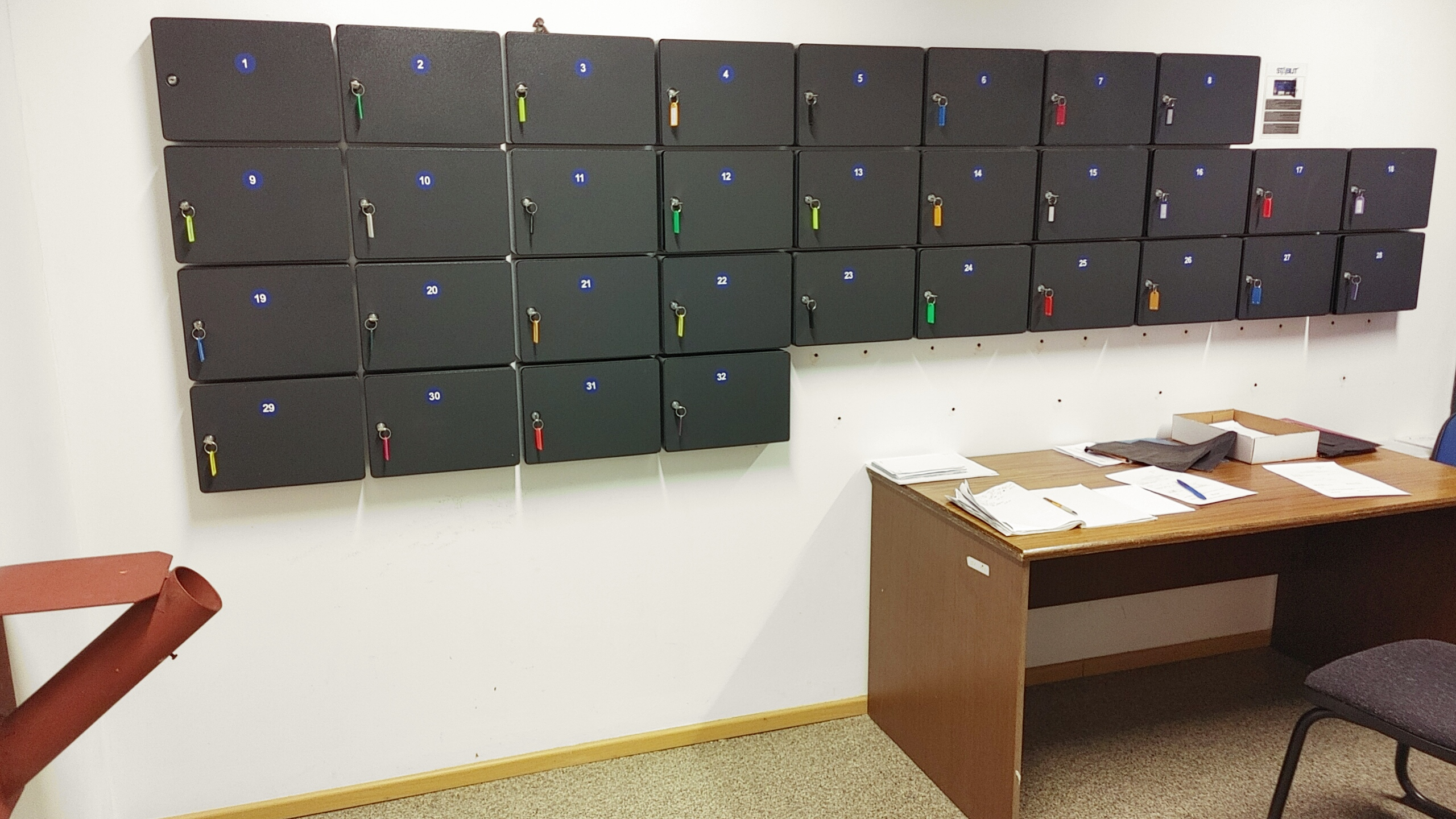
Gun safes for private firearms at a courthouse.

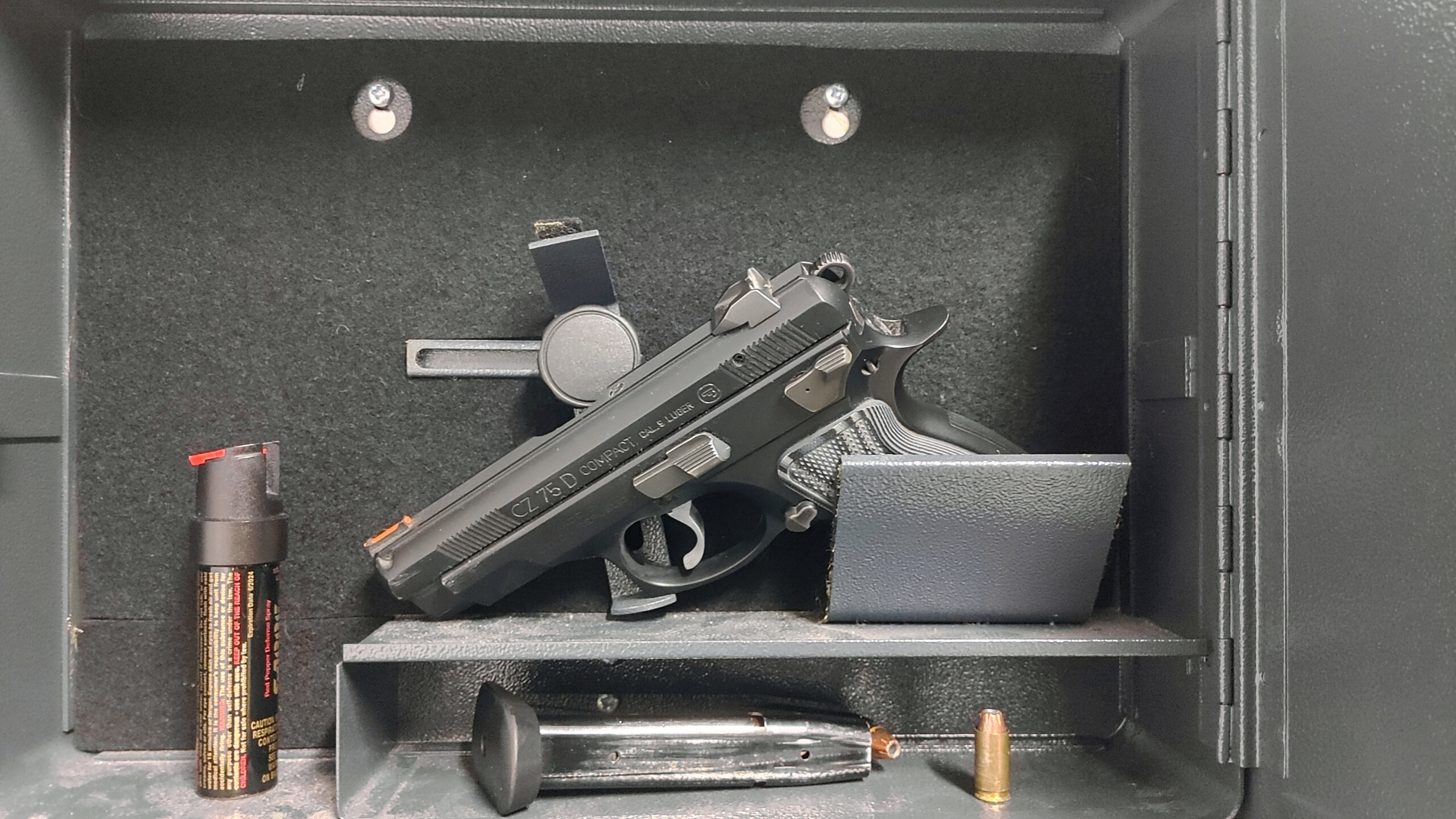
Visitor's unloaded CZ 75 with loaded magazine removed, and a pepper spray within a courthouse gun safe

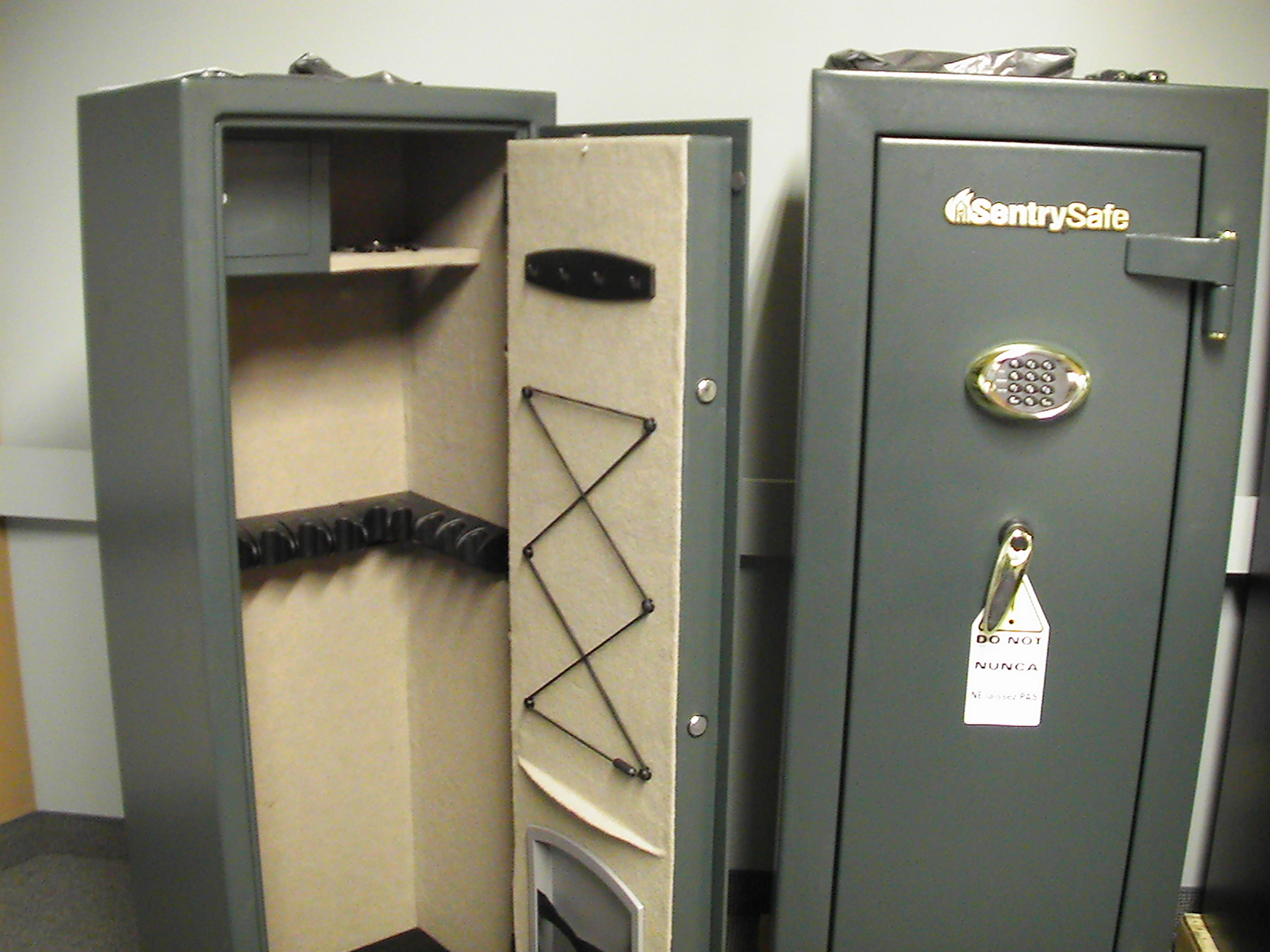
A large gun safe for rifles and shotguns. An internal lockbox for ammunition is fitted at top left

=== Locks ===
There are several types of locks that serve to make it difficult to discharge a firearm. Locks are considered less effective than keeping firearms in a safe since locks typically do not prevent the removal or theft of the firearm, after which the handler can bypass the lock at their leisure. Some manufacturers, such as Taurus, build locks into the firearm itself.

Some jurisdictions such as the US state of California require that locks be tested by a laboratory and receive approval for sale.

==== Trigger lock ====
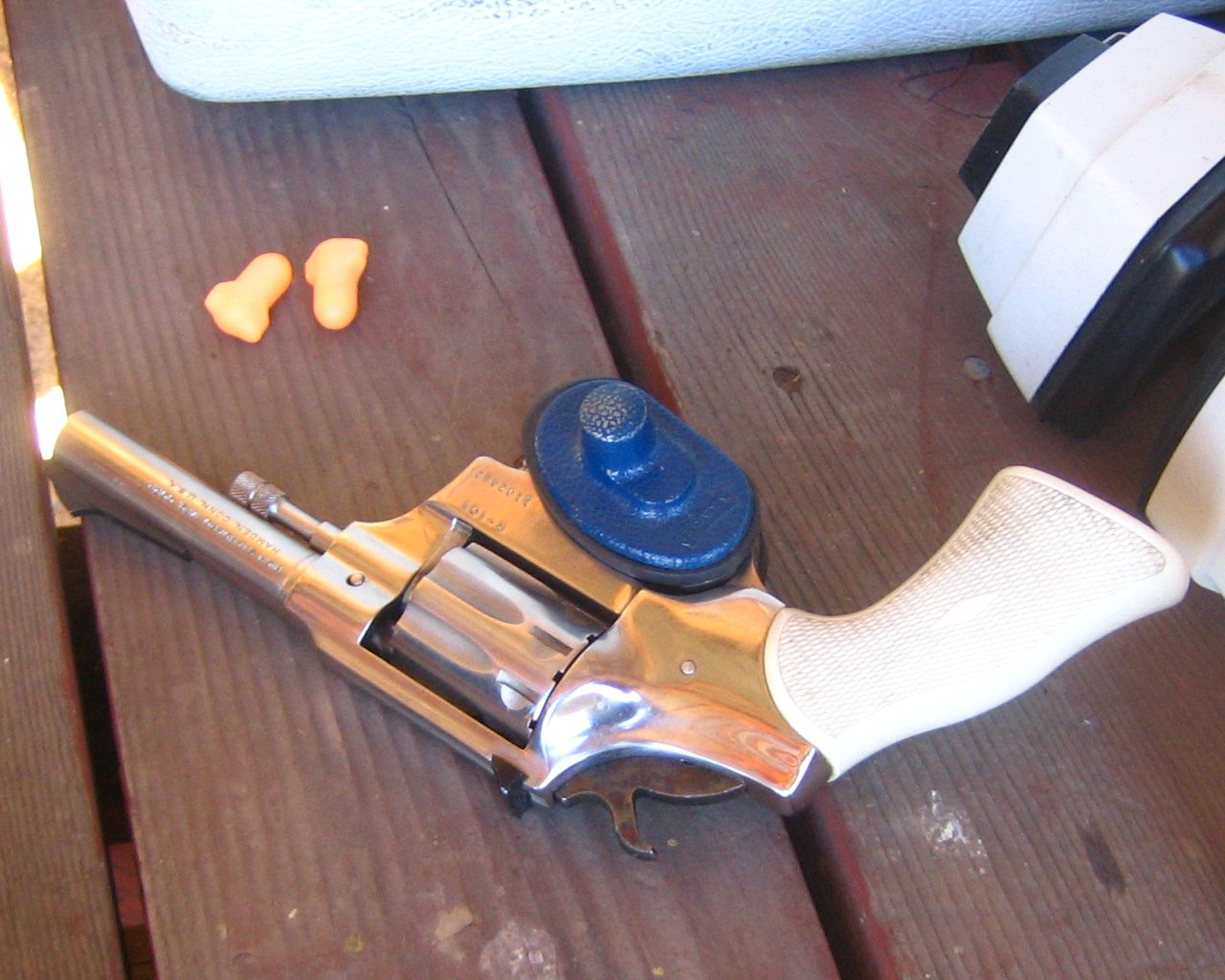
Trigger lock fitted to a revolver

Trigger locks prevent trigger manipulation. Some trigger locks are integrated into the design of the firearm, requiring no external parts besides the key. External trigger locks usually involve two pieces locking together from either side behind the trigger. This physically prevents the trigger from being depressed to discharge the firearm. They may also form part of a larger mechanism which locks the entire action. Other more commercially common types of trigger locks do not go behind the trigger, but encompass the full area within the trigger guard, making the trigger inaccessible to users. Advanced models may also feature anti-tamper alarms. A common critique of trigger locks is the time taken to unlock them, limiting their usefulness in a self-defense scenario. One proposed solution to this is the use of biometric locks which can be removed by the owner near-instantaneously.

There is controversy surrounding manufacturing standards, usage, and legislation of trigger locks. Supporters argue that they protect children by preventing accidents, whilst critics note some models have been shown to be easily removed by children with very little force and common household tools. Additionally, many firearms can discharge when dropped without operating the trigger. Trigger locks are not designed for use on loaded firearms as the locking mechanism itself may foul or manipulate the trigger if pressure is exerted on the lock or during installation/removal; critics argue that this may make the firearm more dangerous by creating the illusion of safety. A former senior product manager at Master Lock was quoted as saying "If it is a loaded gun, there isn't a lock out there that will keep it from being fired... If you put a trigger lock on any loaded gun, you are making the gun more dangerous."

==== Chamber & cable locks ====
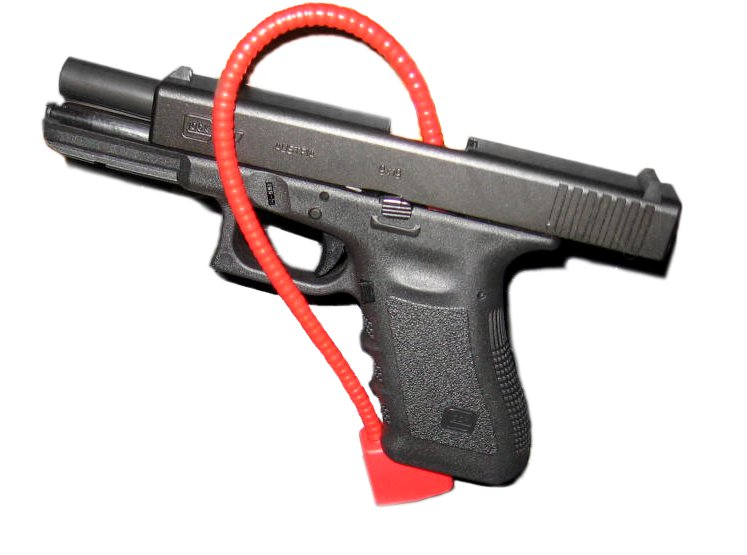
A Glock 19 unloaded with magazine removed, and secured for transport (or storage) with a cable lock through its slide and frame

Chamber locks aim to block ammunition from being chambered, since most firearms typically cannot be discharged unless the ammunition is in the correct position. They are used to prevent live ammunition from being loaded into a firearm by blocking the chamber with a dummy cartridge or a chamber plug. Another type is one in which a steel rod locked into the safety cartridge with a key. As long as the rod and safety cartridge are engaged, the dummy round cannot eject nor can live ammunition be loaded into the firearm. Chamber locks work with most firearm types including revolvers, pistols, rifles and shotguns. They are available in any caliber and length, and may include such features as unique keying, rapid removal.

Cable locks usually thread through the receiver via the ejection port and magazine well of repeating firearms. These locks physically obstruct the movements of the bolt, and also prevent a magazine from being inserted on magazine-fed firearms. preventing the cycling of the action.

== Malfunctions ==
A firearm malfunction is the failure of a firearm to operate as intended for causes other than user error. Malfunctions range from temporary and relatively safe situations, such as a casing that did not eject, to potentially dangerous occurrences that may permanently damage the gun and cause injury or death. Improper handling of certain types of malfunctions can be very dangerous. Following gun safety rules can prevent firearm malfunctions, and limit the damage inflicted by them if they do occur. Proper cleaning and maintenance of a firearm play a big role in preventing malfunctions.

== Smart gun ==
Smart guns featuring "authorised user" technology, are intended to prevent unauthorized use with built-in locks that are released by fingerprint recognition, RFID chips, magnetic rings, a microchip implant or other proximity devices.

Their reliability has been disputed and no models have been commercially marketed.

== Shooting range management ==
Shooting ranges augment physical design features with supervisory measures to ensure safe operation. In addition to generic gun safety rules, local rules or "Range Standing Orders" may be implemented to address specific features of a range.

Ranges will typically be operated under the command of a "Range Conducting Officer" (RCO or RO) or "Range Safety Officer" (RSO) who issues start and stop commands and checks that firearms are clear before being removed from the firing point, or before participants go forward to change targets. At competitions, the RCO may have a secondary responsibility of enforcing rules and fair play.

=== Safety flags ===
Safety flags or breech flags are commonly mandated on shooting ranges to demonstrate that the firearm's bolt or action is open and no round is chambered. For firearms with magazines, the flag may also indicate that the magazine well is clear. Most competition rules mandate the usage of flags whenever a firearm is not directly in use.

Safety lines or clear barrel indicators are mandated for air rifles and air pistols under ISSF rules. Safety lines typically consist of a nylon cord which shows the action is open and that no pellet is present in the breech or barrel.

In clay pigeon shooting, break-barrel shotguns are typically carried in a "broken" state to show that they cannot be fired. Semi-automatic shotguns are typically required to use a breech flag.

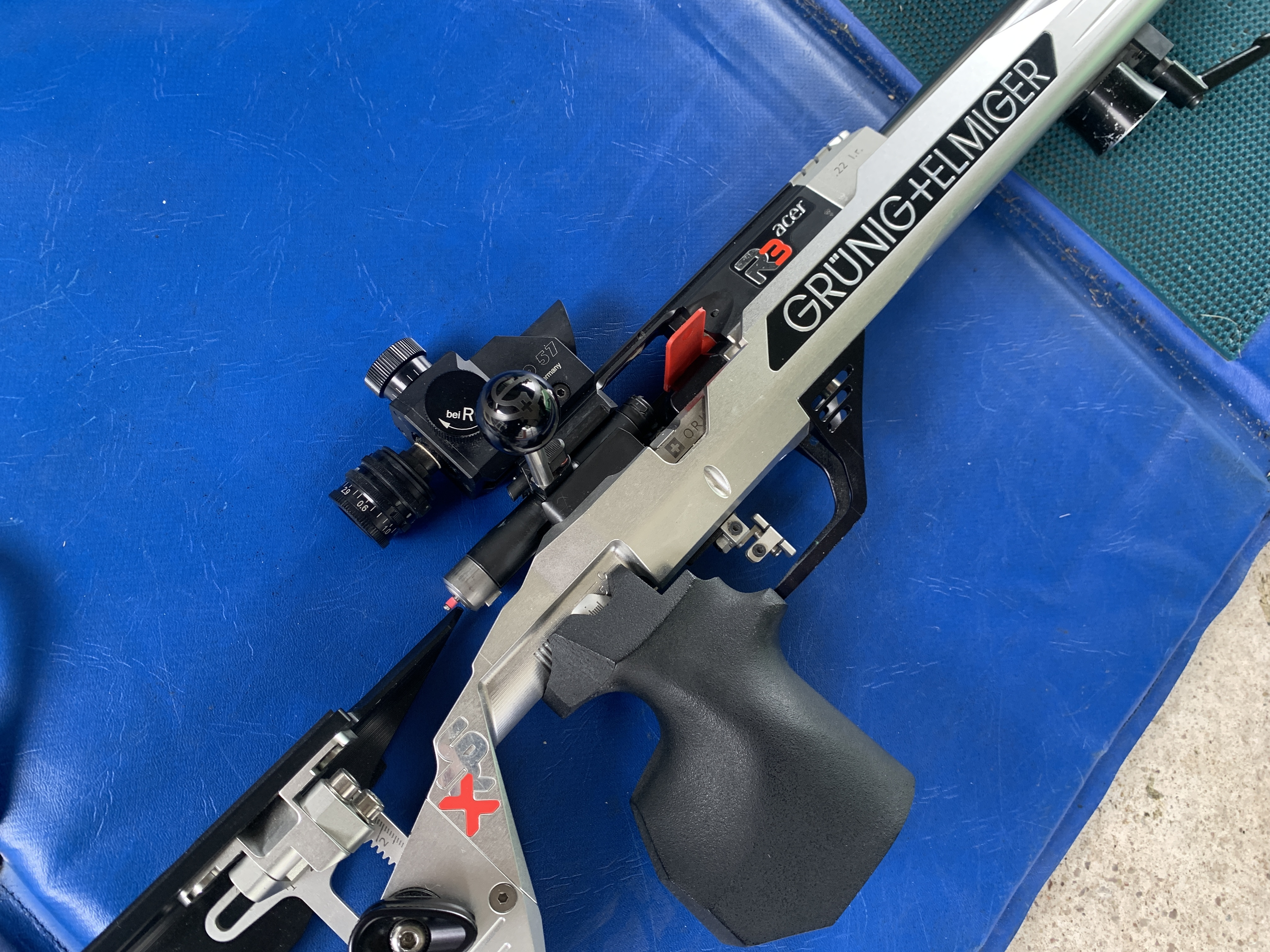
Rifle with a red breech flag inserted

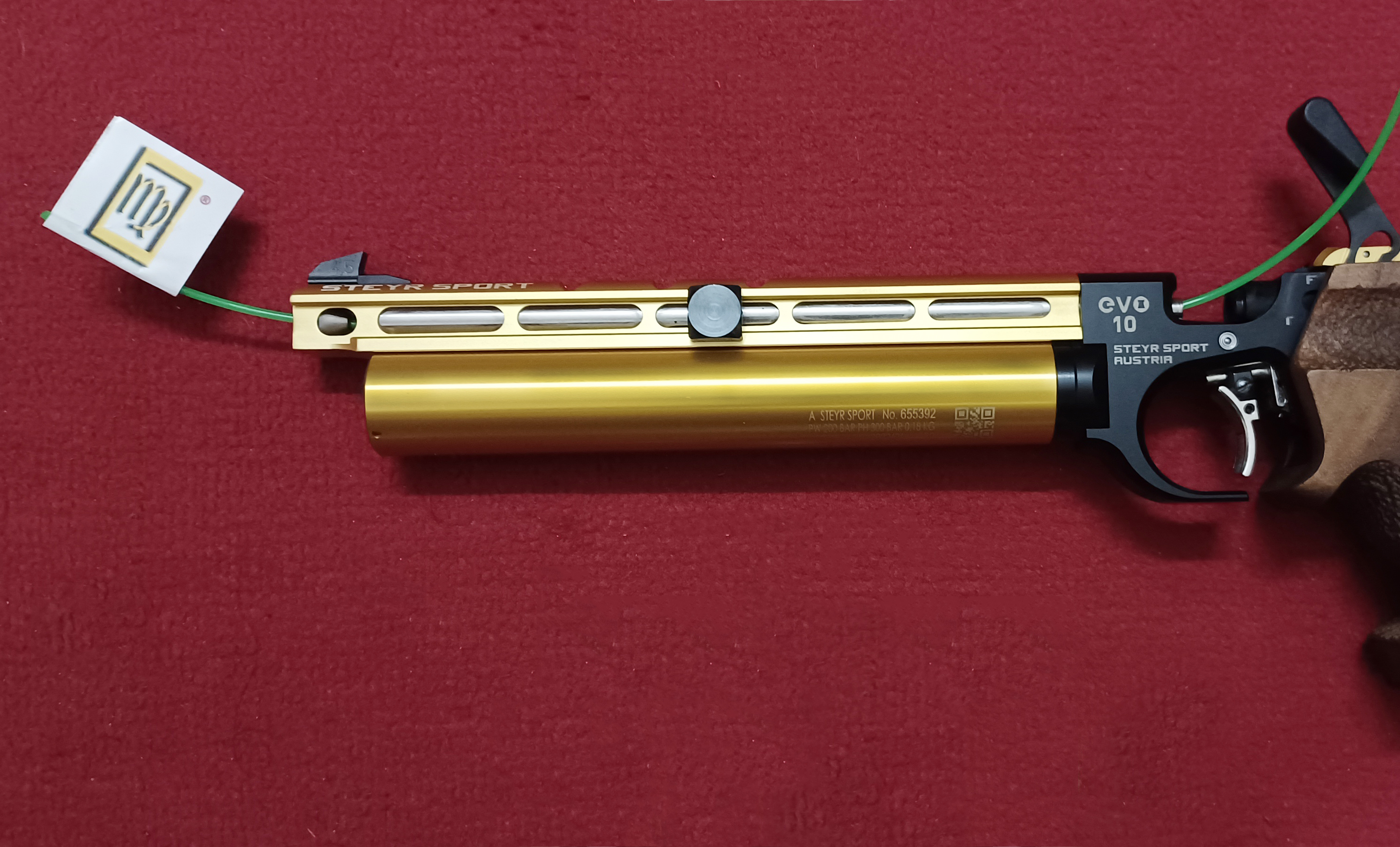
Safety line inserted in a Steyr Evo 10

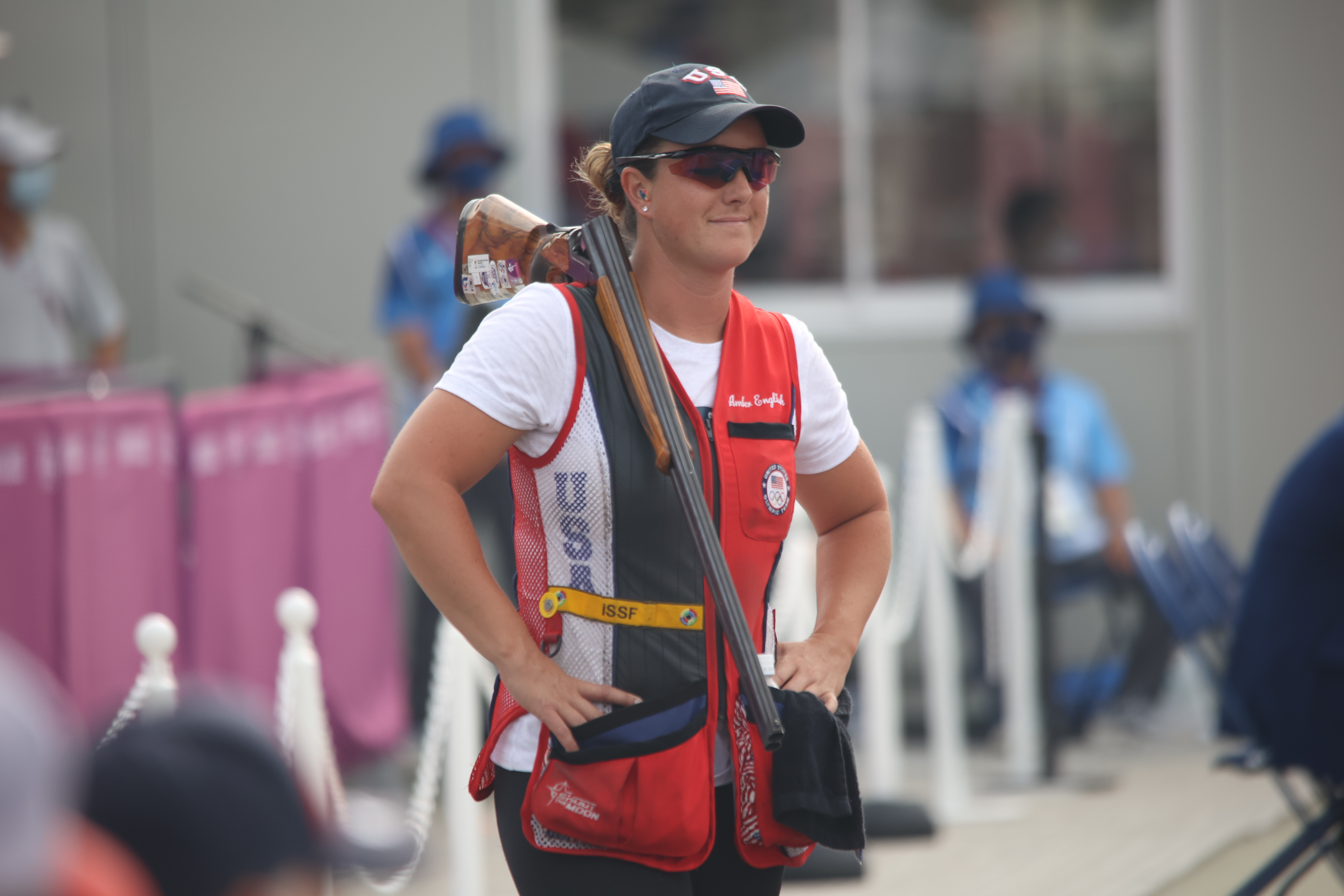
Skeet shooter carries a shotgun "broken", indicating it is in a safe state

=== Safety areas ===
In practical shooting sports, a safety area or safety zone is a bay where competitors can handle unloaded firearms without the supervision of a Range Officer (RO). Safety areas are used in dynamic shooting sport disciplines such as IPSC, PPC 1500 and Steel Challenge, where the lack of a fixed firing point (where firearms would be unboxed in most target disciplines), necessitates provision of a safe location for firearms to be unboxed and holstered before a competitor starts a stage. They may be used to pack, unpack or holster a gun, cleaning or repair, dry firing and training with empty magazines.

== Unsafe users ==
=== Impaired users ===
Firearms should never be handled by persons who are under the influence of alcohol or any drugs which may affect their judgment. Gun safety teachers advocate zero tolerance of their use. In the United States, this recommendation is codified in many states' penal codes as a crime of "carrying under the influence", with penalties similar to DWI/DUI. Other sources of temporary impairment include exhaustion, dehydration, and emotional stress. These can affect reaction time, cognitive processing, sensory perception, and judgment.

Many jurisdictions prohibit the possession of firearms by people deemed generally incapable of using them safely, such as the mentally ill or convicted felons.

=== Children ===
An episode of About Safety, a 1970s educational children's show, on the topic of gun safety

In most jurisdictions, unsupervised access to firearms by children is prohibited by law. Conditions for supervised training and usage, and penalties for allowing a child to access firearms vary with jurisdiction.

==== United States ====
In the United States, the NRA's Eddie Eagle program is intended to teach children to avoid firearm accidents when they encounter guns that have not been securely stored.

Eddie Eagle has been criticised for casting responsibility onto children instead of placing the onus on the adult firearm owner to secure their firearm(s) and ammunition. Studies have cast doubt on the effectiveness of such programmes, whilst finding that Child Access Prevention (CAP) laws are more effective in reducing firearm injuries and deaths amongst children. In K-12 school shootings, more than 80% of shooters stole their guns from family members.

Eddie Eagle has been described as a "Trojan Horse" programme, designed as a way to deter lawmakers from passing CAP laws or mandating secure storage.

Unsupervised access to firearms with ammunition is a major risk factor for youth suicide. The American Academy of Pediatrics (AAP) advises that keeping an unsecured loaded gun in the home, especially a handgun, increases the risk of injury and death for young people.

== Secondary hazards ==
While a firearm's primary danger lies in the discharge of ammunition, there are other ways a firearm may pose hazards to the health of the handler and bystanders.

=== Noise ===
When a firearm is discharged it emits a very loud noise, typically close to the handler's ears. This can cause temporary or permanent hearing damage such as tinnitus. Hearing protection such as earplugs, or earmuffs, or both, can reduce the risk of hearing damage. Some earmuffs or headphones made for shooting and similar loud situations use active noise control. Firearms may also have silencers which reduce the sound intensity from the barrel.

=== Hot gases and debris ===
Firearms emit hot gases, powder, and other debris when discharged. Some firearms, such as semi-automatic and fully automatic firearms, typically eject spent cartridge casings at high speed. Casings are also dangerously hot when ejected. Revolvers store spent casings in the chamber, but may emit a stream of hot gases and fine particulate debris laterally from the interface between the revolving chamber and the barrel.

Any of these may hurt the handler or bystanders through burning or impact damage. Because eyes are particularly vulnerable to this type of damage, eye protection should be worn to reduce the risk of injury. Prescription lenses and various tints to suit different light conditions are available. Some eye protection products are rated to withstand impact from birdshot loads, which offers protection against irresponsible firearms use by other game bird shooters.

=== Compressed air & CO_{2} ===
Pre-charged pneumatic airguns use air cylinders with operating pressures in excess of 200 bars (2,900 psi). These are commonly refilled from diving cylinders, which are periodically recharged at a dive shop. Mishandling of pressure vessels can result in serious injury or death. Tanks and cylinders should be maintained and inspected in accordance with manufacturer's instructions, and only used by trained individuals.

=== Toxins and pollutants ===
In recent years the toxic effects of ammunition and firearm cleaning agents have been highlighted.

- Lead dust may build up on indoor ranges.
- Lead ammunition left in nature may become mobilized by acid rain.
- Older ammunition may have mercury-based primers.
- Lead accumulates in shooting range backstops.

Indoor ranges require good ventilation to remove pollutants such as powder, smoke, and lead dust from the air around the shooters, and regular cleaning and maintenance to prevent buildup of contaminants.

Indoor and outdoor ranges typically require extensive decontamination when they are decommissioned to remove all traces of lead, copper, and powder residues from the area. Lead, copper and other metals will also be released when a firearm is cleaned. Highly aggressive solvents and other agents used to remove lead and powder fouling may also present a hazard to health. Installing good ventilation, washing hands after handling firearms, and cleaning the space where the firearm was handled lessens the risk of unnecessary exposure.

== See also ==
- Bullet trap
- Glossary of firearms terms
