= Blank (cartridge) =

Firearms filler device that produces an explosion but does not fire a projectile

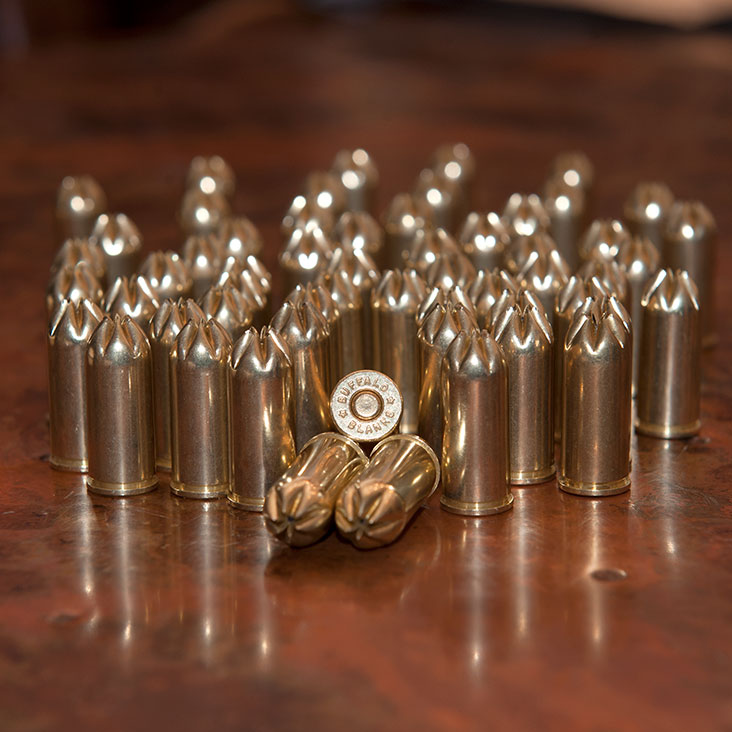
Handgun blanks

A blank is a firearm cartridge that, when fired, does not shoot a projectile like a bullet or pellet, but generates a muzzle flash and an explosive sound (muzzle report) like a normal gunshot would. Firearms may need to be modified to allow a blank to cycle the action, and the shooter experiences less recoil with a blank than with a live round. Blanks are often used in prop guns for shooting simulations that do not need ballistic results, but still demand light and sound effects, such as in historical reenactments, special effects for theatre, movie and television productions, combat training, for signaling, and cowboy mounted shooting. Specialised blank cartridges are also used for their propellant force in fields as varied as construction, shooting sports, and fishing and general recreation.

While blanks are less dangerous than live ammunition, they can still be dangerous and cause fatal injuries. Besides the explosive gases, any objects in the cartridge (like wadding that may be keeping the propellant in place, or objects lodged in the barrel) will be propelled at high velocity and cause injury or death at close range.

Blank cartridges differ from the inert/fake ammunitions such as dummy cartridges and snap caps, which contain no primer or gunpowder even to produce flash and sound and are used for "cold" training or function-testing firearm actions. They are also different from the percussion caps used in cap guns, which also produce a sound of gunfire but only consist of the equivalent of the primer with no propellant, and so are much quieter.

== Applications ==
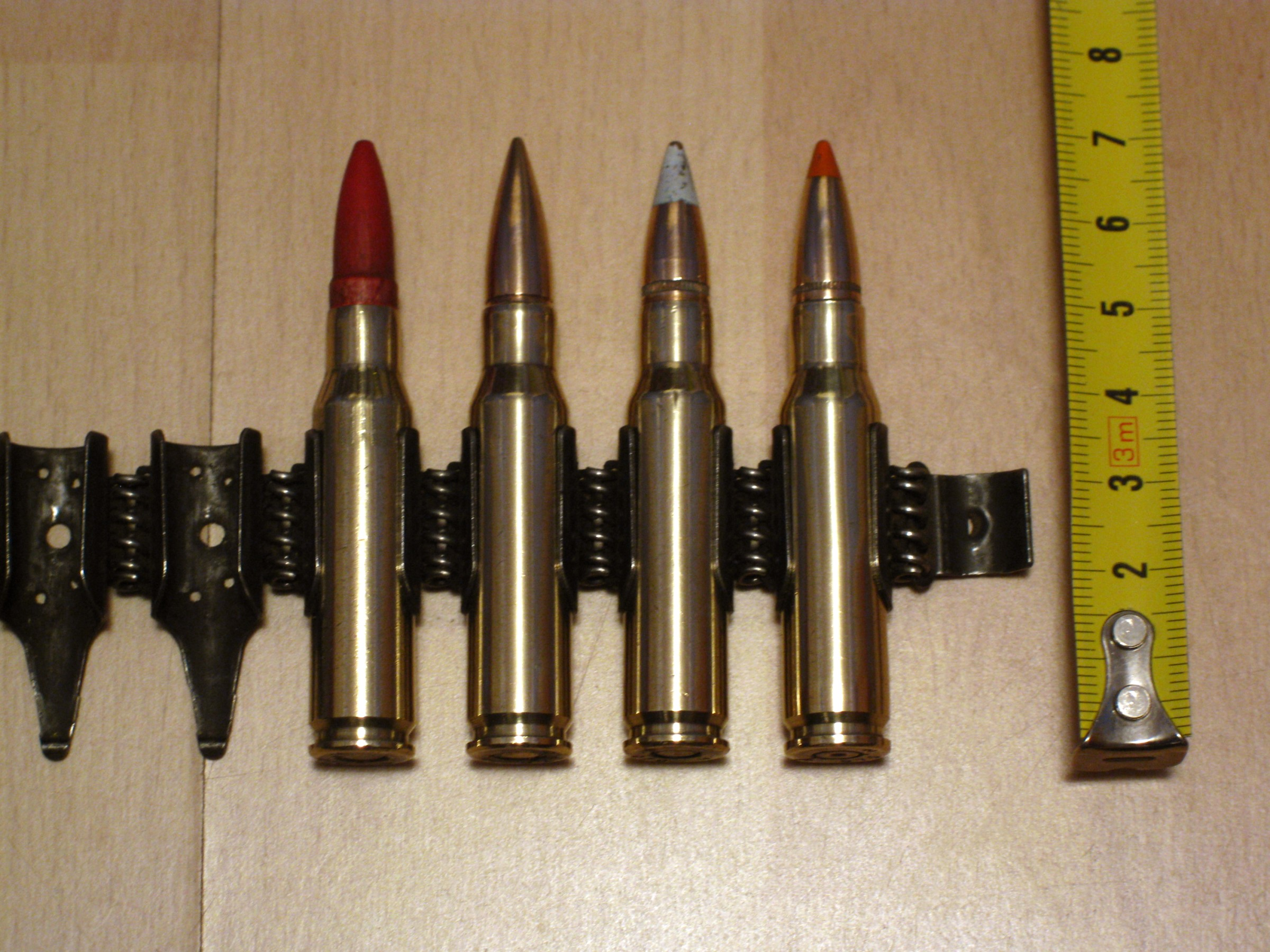
Swedish 7.62×51 mm cartridge with blank on the left (followed by full metal jacket, tracer and armour-piercing); the red wooden plug is clearly visible

Blanks are commonly used when the sound and flash of gunfire is needed, but a projectile would not be safe, such as in military training manoeuvres or funeral honours, in movies or live theatre that require gunfights, in starter pistols to signal the beginning of races, and in the equestrian sport of cowboy mounted shooting.

Standard self-loading firearms require either a mechanism modification or a blank-firing adapter to allow the action to cycle. This is because, in the absence of a projectile to oppose the force of the gases, the lower pressures and lower recoil generated by a blank cartridge are insufficient to cycle the gun's mechanism in the same way that a standard live round would.

For military applications, blanks are typically used with a special blank-firing adaptor in the firearm that constricts the barrel, keeping chamber pressures created by the blank high enough and for long enough to cycle the firearm's gas-operated action. In the case of non-crimped blanks, it also serves to pulverise the plug, preventing it from leaving as a projectile.

Specially designed blank-firing prop firearms are sometimes used for movies, thereby avoiding gun control legislation and increasing the margin of safety because they cannot be loaded with live ammunition. 5-in-1 blanks are specifically made for theatrical use and are commonly used in real firearms for dramatic effect. 5-in-1 blanks can function in a variety of different calibers, hence the name.

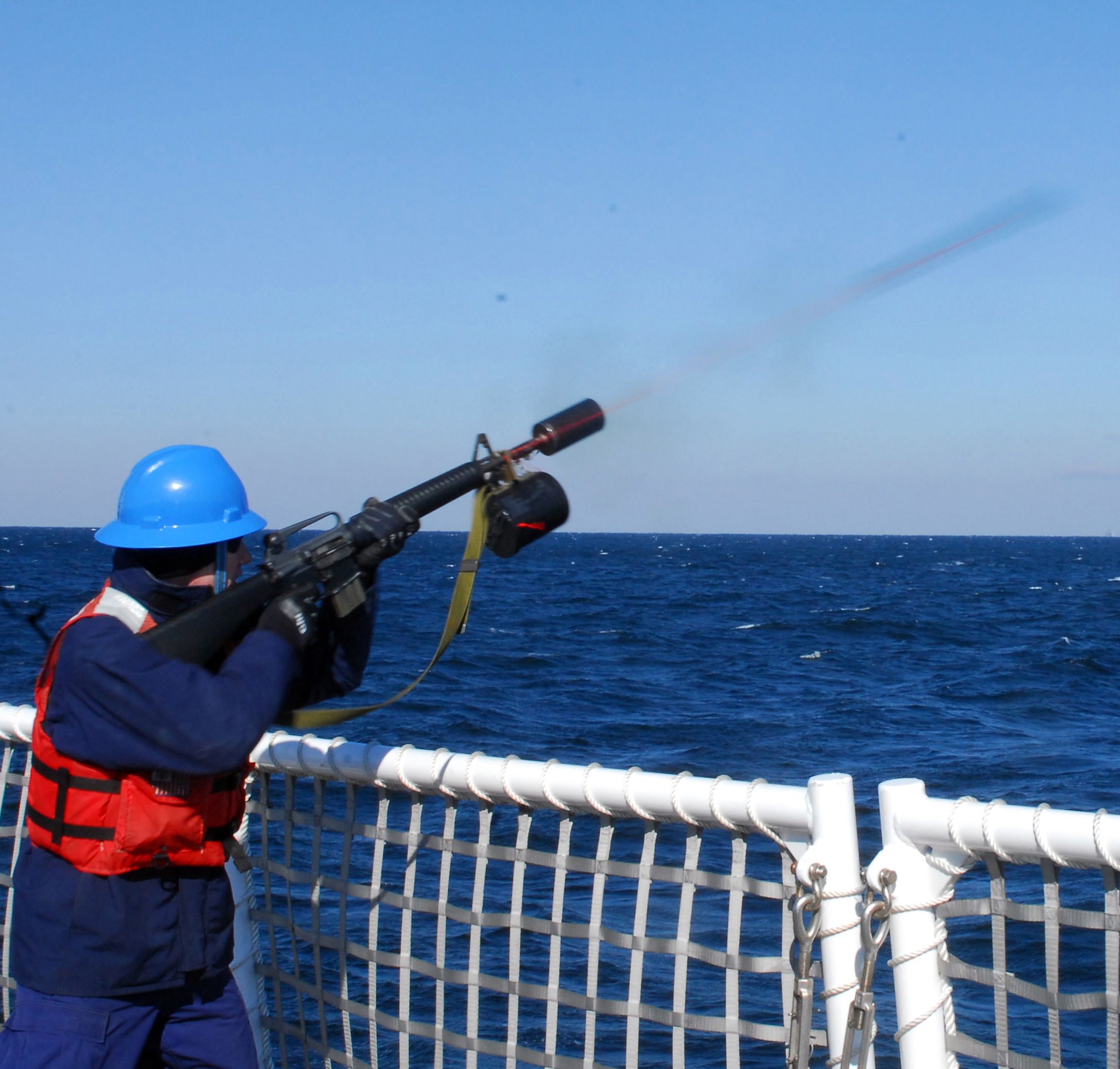
A USCG coastguardsman uses a specially adapted firearm to fire a messenger line to another vessel.

Special blank cartridges are also used when explosive power is needed, but a projectile is not. Blank cartridges were commonly used for launching a messenger line, tear-gas or rifle grenades, though some types of grenades are capable of trapping the bullet of a live round. Larger blanks are also used with line-launching guns, such as the line-launching kit for the Mossberg 500 shotgun.

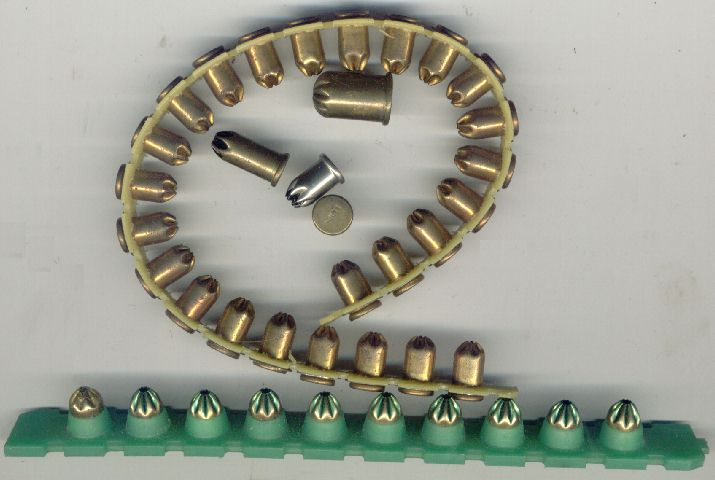
Rimfire blank cartridges as used in nail guns

Blank rimfire cartridges, commonly called power loads, are also used in some nail guns (powder-actuated tools), where the power is tapped to force a heavy piston into the nail, with enough force to bury its full length into steel or concrete.

Some forms of fast draw competitions use special blanks loaded with a layer of slow-burning rifle powder on top of a thin layer of faster-burning pistol powder. The pistol powder ignites the slower-burning rifle powder and fires it out of the barrel much like a shotgun shell. The burning powder only travels a few yards before it completely combusts, but that is far enough to burst the balloon used as a target for those competitions. Wax bullets are also commonly used for competitions and training where a non-lethal projectile is required.

A blank cartridge was sometimes also issued to a randomly selected shooter in an execution by firing squad, on the theory that each of the shooters would take comfort in the fact that they may not have fired a live round. This tradition dates back to before cartridge arms, when a muzzle loading musket would be loaded without a ball.

Blank cartridges power some abattoir captive bolt pistols.

Blank 12-gauge shotgun cartridges are also used in "alarm mines", devices that use a tripwire to produce an extremely loud report to alert people in the vicinity.

Blank rounds have been used to contain the propellant within an empty cartridge, or in some cases as a piston to unlock the bolt and operate the weapon. These types of rounds are rarely used and are mostly found on spotting rifles.

== Safety ==
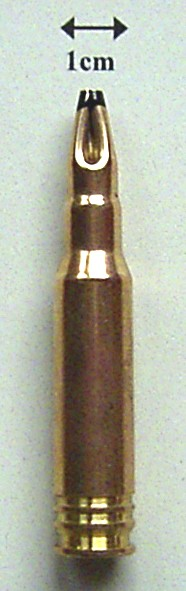
A 7.62×51mm NATO crimped blank cartridge

The appearance of a blank cartridge can give a false sense of safety. Although most blank cartridges do not contain a bullet, precautions are still required because fatalities and severe injuries have resulted on occasions when blank cartridges have been fired at very close ranges.

Blank cartridges frequently contain a paper, wood, or plastic plug called a wad that seals the powder in the case. This wad can cause severe penetrating wounds at close range and bruising at medium ranges. There is also "muzzle blast" – a jet of hot, expanding gas expelled at extremely high velocity from the muzzle of the firearm. This high-velocity gas can inflict severe injury at close ranges. In addition, if there is any small debris lodged inside the barrel, it will be expelled at a velocity similar to that of a bullet, with the ability to inflict a severe or lethal wound. Furthermore, the extremely loud noise of blanks being fired can damage the hearing of people in the immediate area.

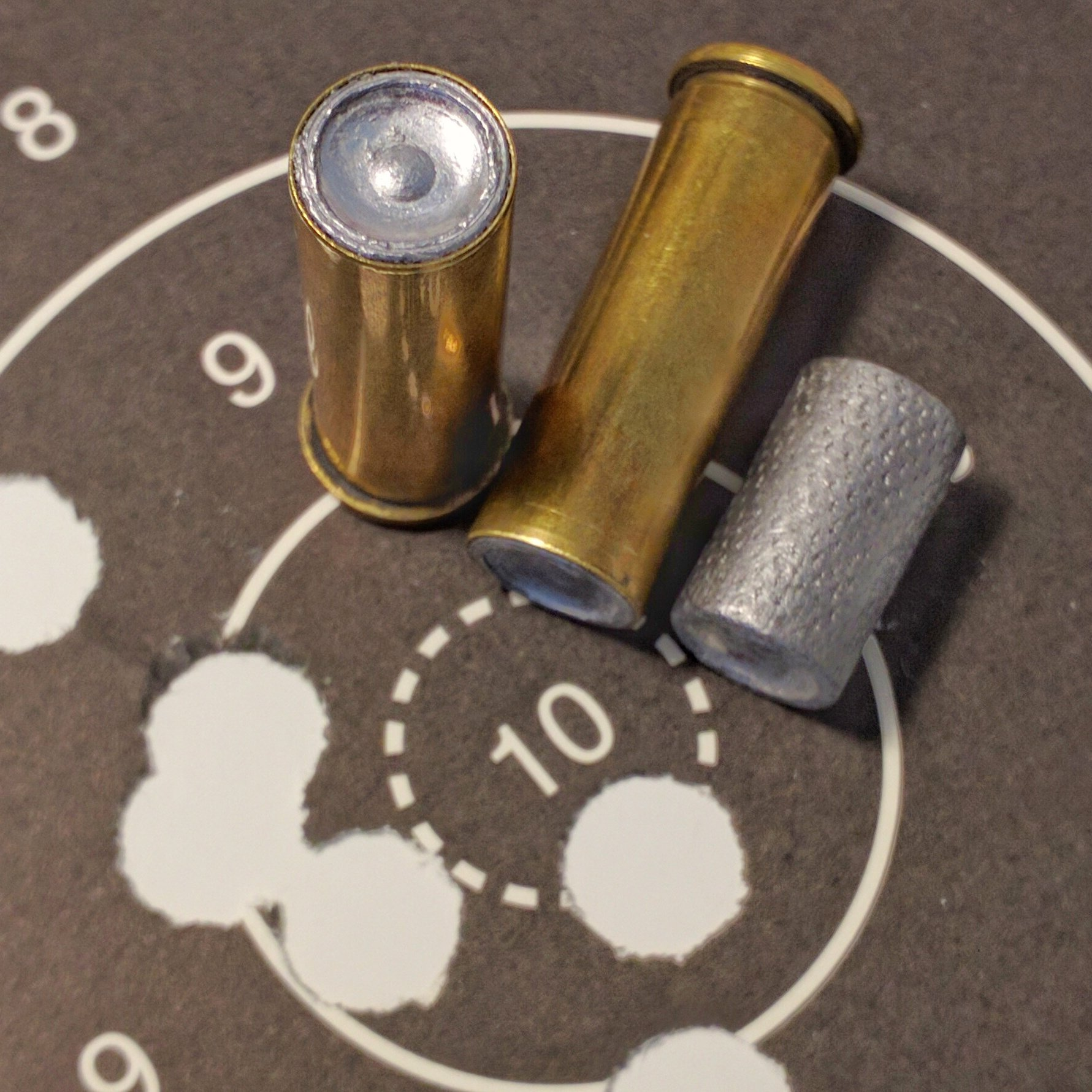
Wadcutter rounds may be mistaken for blanks because the bullet does not protrude from the end of the cartridge.

Cartridges loaded with wadcutter target bullets can be mistaken for blanks because the bullet does not protrude past the mouth of the cartridge casing. Shotshell cartridges known as "snake shot" or "rat-shot" used in rifles or handguns for pest control often have the shot charge sealed with cardboard or plastic wads, or the ends may be crimped or folded like that of blank cartridges.

=== Fatal accidents ===
Actors in particular are at serious risk of injury from blank cartridges used on movie sets. Several actors have been killed in such mishaps:

- Brandon Lee was killed while filming a scene for the 1994 film The Crow by a .44-caliber S&W Model 629 revolver used as a prop that still contained a bullet from a squib load. A dummy round used during an earlier shoot was handloaded by someone other than a firearms expert, who removed the propellant powder, but unknowingly left a live primer in place, resulting in the bullet being separated from its casing with insufficient energy to exit the barrel. The gun was not properly checked for a retained bullet before the incident, and then subsequently fired with a blank cartridge. The blank charge propelled the lodged bullet out of the barrel, fatally injuring Lee.
- Jon-Erik Hexum accidentally killed himself on the set of the TV series Cover Up, after he placed a blank-loaded .44 Magnum revolver to his right temple and pulled the trigger as a joke — the powerful shockwave from the blank cartridge caused a depression fracture to the skull, sending bone fragments deep into his brain and causing severe intracranial hemorrhage. He died a few days after the accident.
- Johann Ofner, a professional stunt double, was killed by a shotgun wad in 2017 while filming a scene for Bliss n Eso music video "Dopamine" in the Brooklyn Standard bar in Brisbane when an actor fired directly at him.
- In 2015, a 17-year-old was playing with a gun used in a St. George, Utah, high school theatre program to be used in a production of Oklahoma! and accidentally killed himself, thinking that "blank" cartridges were harmless.

== See also ==
- Coffman engine starter
