= Training weapon =

Training weapon may refer to:

- Practice weapon
- Systema Training Weapon

== See also ==
- Weapons training (disambiguation)
