= Foam concrete =

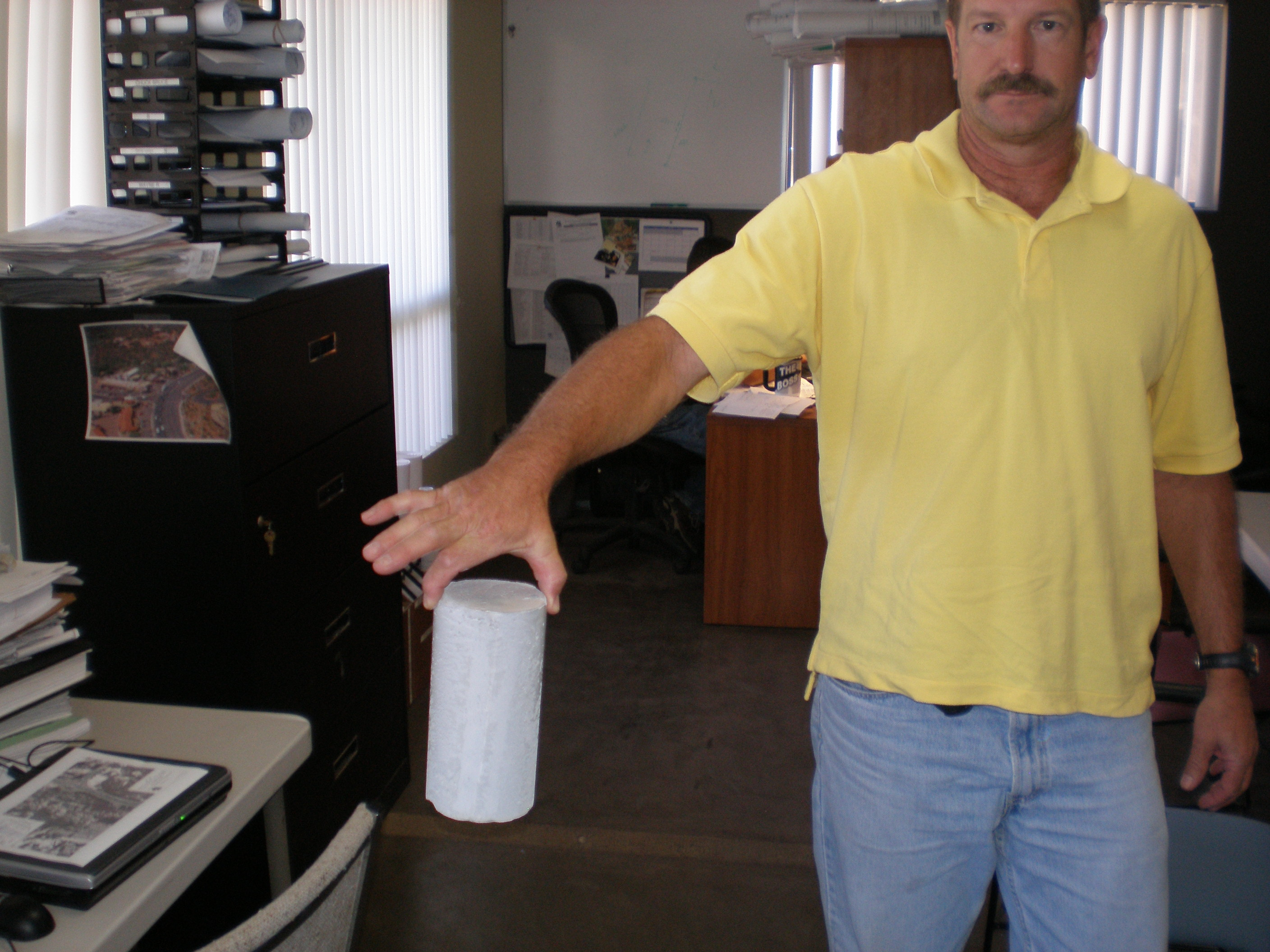
A cylinder of foam concrete.

Foam concrete, also known as lightweight cellular concrete (LCC) and low density cellular concrete (LDCC), and by other names, is defined as a cement-based slurry, with a minimum of 20% (per volume) foam entrained into the plastic mortar. As mostly no coarse aggregate is used for production of foam concrete, the correct term would be mortar instead of concrete; it may be called "foamed cement" as well. The density of foam concrete usually varies from 400 kg/m^{3} (670 lb/cu yd) to 1,600 kg/m^{3} (2,700 lb/cu yd). The density is normally controlled by substituting all or part of the fine aggregate with the foam.

== Terminology ==
Foam concrete is also called foamed concrete, foam concrete, aerated concrete, aircrete, cellular lightweight concrete, or reduced density concrete.

== History ==
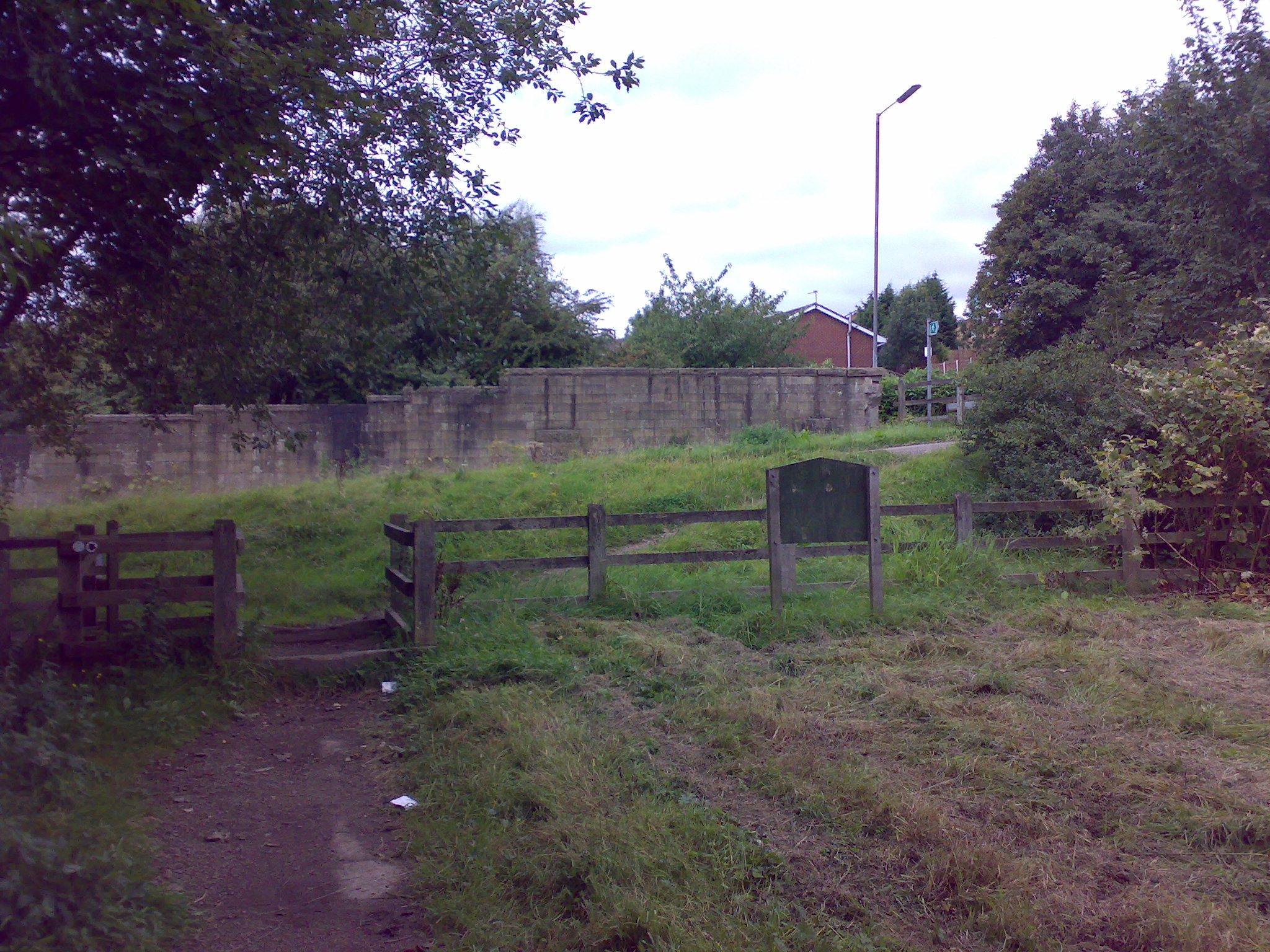
The 1930s-era Smithy bridge used foamed concrete for infilling.

The history of foam concrete dates back to the early 1920s and the production of autoclaved aerated concrete, which was used mainly as insulation. A detailed study concerning the composition, physical properties and production of foamed concrete was first carried out in the 1950s and 60s. Following this research, new admixtures were developed in the late 1970s and early 80s, which led to the commercial use of foamed concrete in construction projects. Initially, it was used in the Netherlands for filling voids and for ground stabilisation. Further research carried out in the Netherlands helped bring about the more widespread use of foam concrete as a building material. More recently, foam concrete is being made with a continuous foam generator. The foam is produced by agitating a foaming agent with compressed air to make "aircrete" or "foamcrete". This material is fireproof, insect proof, and waterproof. It offers significant thermal and acoustic insulation and can be cut, carved, drilled and shaped with wood-working tools. This construction material can be used to make foundations, subfloors, building blocks, walls, domes, or even arches that can be reinforced with a construction fabric.

== Manufacturing ==
Foamed concrete typically consists of a slurry of cement or fly ash and sand and water, although some suppliers recommend pure cement and water with the foaming agent for very lightweight mixes. This slurry is further mixed with a synthetic aerated foam in a concrete mixing plant. The foam is created using a foaming agent, mixed with water and air from a generator. The foaming agent must be able to produce air bubbles with a high level of stability, resistant to the physical and chemical processes of mixing, placing, and hardening.

Foamed concrete mixture may be poured or pumped into molds, or directly into structural elements. The foam enables the slurry to flow freely due to the thixotropic behavior of the foam bubbles, allowing it to be easily poured into the chosen form or mold. The viscous material requires up to 24 hours to solidify (or as little as two hours if steam cured with temperatures up to 70 °C to accelerate the process.), depending on variables including ambient temperature and humidity. Once solidified, the formed product may be released from its mold. A new application in foam concrete manufacturing is to cut large concrete cakes into blocks of different sizes by a cutting machine using special steel wires. The cutting action takes place before the concrete has fully cured.

There have been attempts at simplifying this process with the addition of xanthan gum to help stabilize the foam, although mechanical properties of the result and similarities to traditionally made foam concrete are still to be determined.

== Properties ==
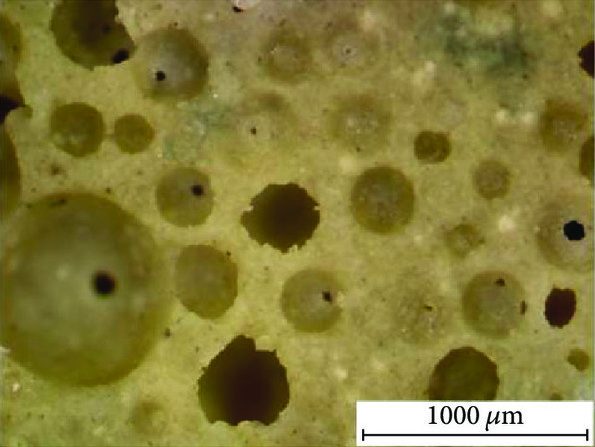
A sample of foamed concrete used for measurement.

Foam concrete is a versatile building material with a simple production method that is relatively inexpensive compared to autoclave aerated concrete. Foam concrete compounds utilising fly ash in the slurry mix is cheaper still, and has less environmental impact. Foam concrete is produced in a variety of densities from 200 kg/m^{3} to 1,600 kg/m^{3} depending on the application. Lighter density products may be cut into different sizes. While the product is considered a form of concrete (with air bubbles replacing aggregate), its high thermal and acoustical insulating qualities make it a very different application than conventional concrete.

== Advantages ==
- In terms of thermal conductivity, foam concrete is not inferior to wood. A 40 cm wall is able to withstand -30°C frost.
- Foam concrete withstands one-sided exposure to fire for at least three hours, and on average, five hours.

== Applications ==
Foamed concrete can be produced with dry densities of 400 to 1600 kg/m^{3} (25 lb/ft^{3} to 100 lb/ft^{3}), with 7-day strengths of approximately 1 to 10 N/mm^{2} (145 to 1450 psi) respectively. Foam concrete is fire resistant, and its thermal and acoustical insulation properties make it ideal for a wide range of purposes, from insulating floors and roofs to void filling. It is also particularly useful for trench reinstatement.

A few of the applications of foam concrete are:

- bridge approaches / embankments
- pipeline abandonment / annular fill
- trench backfill
- precast blocks
- precast wall elements / panels
- cast-in-situ / cast-in-place walls
- insulating compensation laying
- insulation floor screeds
- insulation roof screeds
- sunken portion filling
- trench reinstatement
- sub-base in highways
- filling of hollow blocks
- prefabricated insulation boards

== Trends and development ==
Until the mid-1990s, foam concrete was regarded as weak and non-durable with high shrinkage characteristics. This is due to the unstable foam bubbles resulted in foam concrete having properties unsuitable for producing very low density (Less than 300 kg/m^{3} dry density) as well as load bearing structural applications. It is therefore important to ensure that the air entrained into the foamed concrete is contained in stable, very tiny, uniform bubbles that remain intact and isolated, and do not thus increase the permeability of the cement paste between the voids.

The development of synthetic-enzyme based foaming agents; foam stability enhancing admixtures; and specialized foam generating, mixing, and pumping equipment has improved the stability of the foam and hence foam concrete, making it possible to manufacture as light as 75 kg/m^{3} density, a density that is just 7.5% of water. The enzyme consists of highly active proteins of biotechnological origin not based on protein hydrolysis. In recent years foamed concrete has been used extensively in highways, commercial buildings, disaster rehabilitation buildings, schools, apartments and housing developments in countries such as Germany, USA, Brazil, Singapore, India, Malaysia, Kuwait, Nigeria, Bangladesh, Botswana, Mexico, Indonesia, Libya, Saudi Arabia, Algeria, Iraq, Egypt, and Vietnam.

== Shock-absorption ==
Foamed concrete has been investigated for use as a bullet trap in high intensity US military firearm training ranges. This work resulted in the product SACON being fielded by the U.S. Army Corps of Engineers, which when worn out, can be shipped directly to metal recycling facilities without requiring the separation of the trapped bullets, as the calcium carbonate in the concrete acts as a flux.

The energy absorption capacity of foamed concrete was approximated from drop testing and found to vary from 4 to 15 MJ/m^{3} depending on its density. With optimum absorption estimated from a 1000 kg/m^{3} moderate density mix at water to cement (w/c) ratios from 0·6 to 0·7.
