= Snap cap =

Firearm accessory device

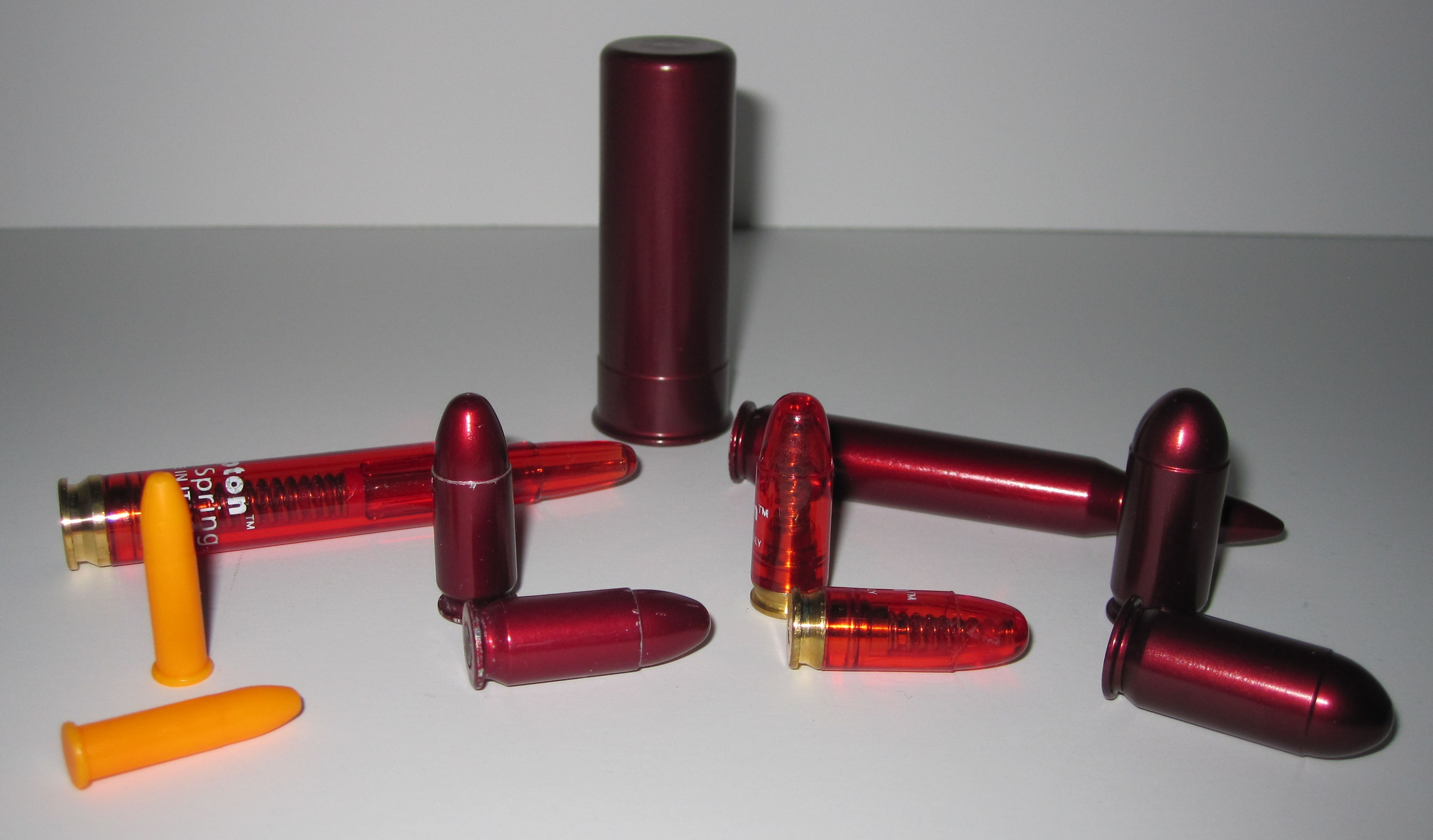
An assortment of snap caps of varying calibers, from left: (1st row) .22 LR, 9mm (both), .45 ACP, (2nd row) 30-06 (both), (3rd row) 12 Ga.

A snap cap is a firearm accessory device shaped like a standard cartridge/shotshell but contains no functional components, namely the primer, propellant (gunpowder) and projectile (bullet or slug). It serves the same purpose as a dummy round, but differs in that a dummy is usually modified from a real cartridge with its propellant and primer removed (but still has the projectile crimped to the casing), while a snap cap has a monolithic outer shell and is specifically designed to be a fake cartridge from the very beginning.

The term "snap cap" is a generic trademark of the fake cartridge originally introduced by American firearm accessory brand "A-Zoom", and is a word play on percussion cap. It is now used to refer to any accessory product made to perform similar function.

== Description ==
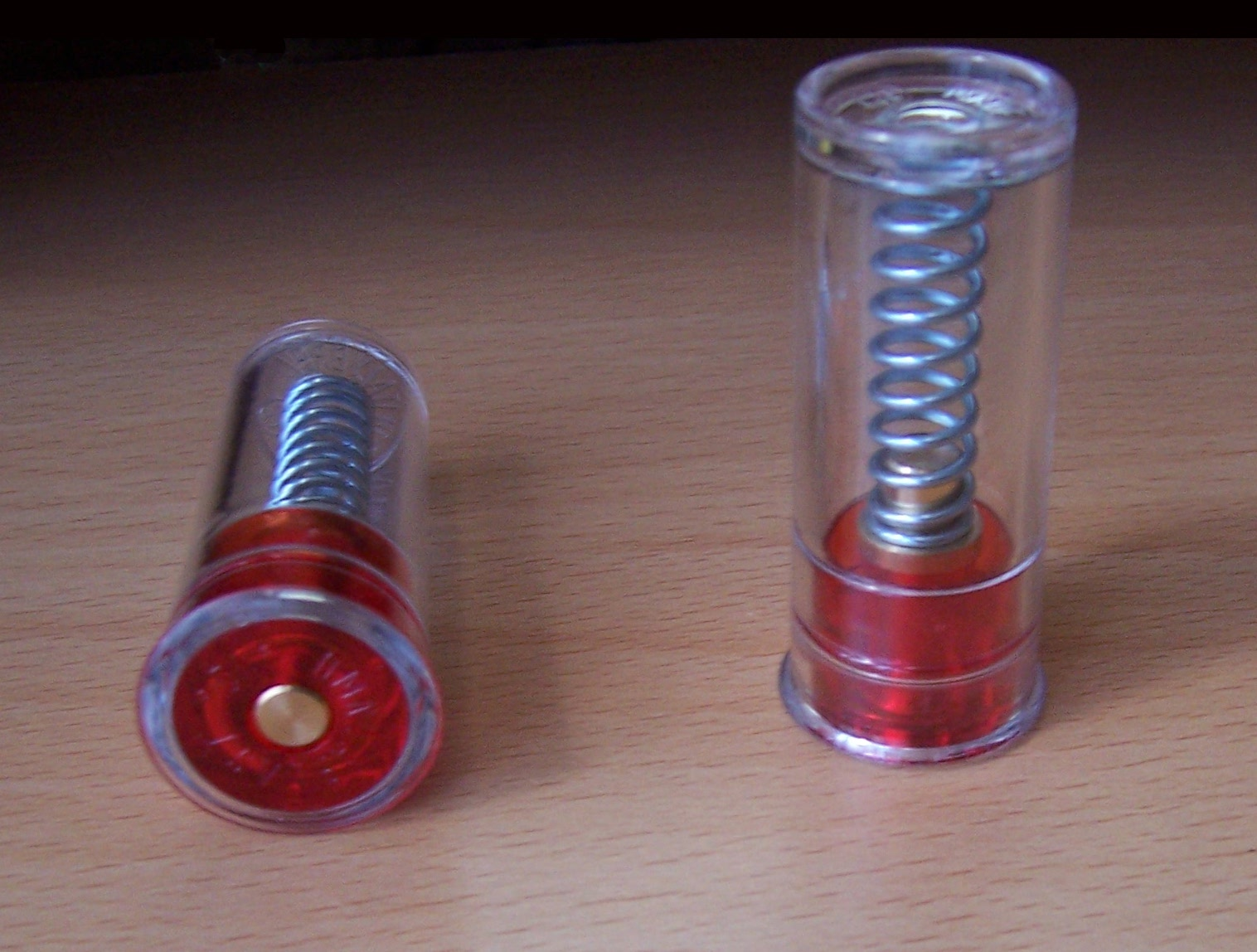
A pair of 12 gauge shotshell snap caps with spring-damped fake primers

A snap cap is used to ensure that dry-firing firearms of certain designs does not cause stress and impact damage to the firing pin and/or the barrel breech. Some snap caps contain a false primer that is either spring-buffered, made of rubber or soft polymer, or none at all. The springs or plastic will absorb the impact force from the firing pin during dry-firing, allowing the user to practice trigger pull or safely test the function of the firearm action without damaging its components.

Rimfire and a small number of centerfire firearms of older design should not be test-fired with the chamber empty, as this can lead to weakening or breakage of the firing pin and increased wear to other components in those firearms. In the instance of a rimfire firearm, dry firing can also cause deformation of the chamber edge due to the firing pin striking it without the cartridge rim in between. For this reason some shooters use a snap cap in an attempt to cushion the firearm's firing pin as it moves forward. Most commercial snap caps have a polymer/rubber false primer to receive the firing pin strikes, which is usually usable for up to 300 to 400 clicks. After that, due to the impact crater on the false primer becoming deepened from the repeated strikes, the firing pin does not touch and transfer its momentum, and the snap cap loses its cushioning effect. Some higher-end snap caps have a spring-dampened false primer that can last much longer, but are also more expensive to make.

Some snap caps are made of a soft aluminum coated with paint. Other snap caps are manufactured using traditional brass shell casings and injecting a polymer material, while others are made from a solid piece of plastic, including via 3D printing.

== Uses ==
=== Function check ===
Snap caps are used to confirm a firearm is functioning properly without using live ammunition. In the case of some repeating firearms, it can be used to ensure the magazine is feeding ammunition properly up the feed ramp and into the chamber.

=== Dry-fire practice ===
Snap caps are used for general dry-firing practice. There is some debate as to if dry firing a handgun may cause damage to the firing pin in a modern firearm. Using a snap cap or dummy round eliminates any potential risk of doing so if the snap cap has a solid primer cup. Some snap caps are made without a primer cup, and thus do not address this potential concern.

=== Malfunction training ===
Snap caps and action-proving dummy cartridges also work as a training tool to simulate firearm malfunctions, the same as a dud would. The shooter loads one or more snap caps into the firearm or magazine along with live rounds; when the trigger is pulled with a snap cap in the chamber, a failure to fire occurs. The shooter can then practice clearing the bad round, which generally requires manually cycling the slide of a semi-automatic pistol.

=== Trigger control training ===
As with malfunction training, snap caps are loaded along with live rounds, so that when the trigger is pulled with a snap cap in the chamber, the firearm does not fire. Here, the intent is to observe whether the shooter maintained proper trigger control (that is, did not flinch). This is often referred to as a ball and dummy drill.
