= Cowboy mounted shooting =

Type of competitive equestrian sport

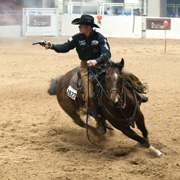
Mounted shooting

Cowboy mounted shooting (also called western mounted shooting and mounted shooting) is a competitive equestrian sport involving the riding of a horse to negotiate a shooting pattern. Depending on sponsoring organizations, it can be based on the historical reenactment of historic shooting events held at Wild West shows in the late 19th century. Modern events use blank ammunition instead of live rounds, certified to break a target balloon within twenty feet (6 m).

== History ==
In the spirit of the soldier and cowboy, one organization, the Cowboy Mounted Shooting Association (CMSA) was created in the mid-1990s for equestrians and cowboy action shooters to participate in a competitive shooting sport while riding horseback. The Mounted Shooters of America was formed in 2000 and may belong to either or both associations.

== Firearms and safety ==
Mounted shooting requires competitors to use four guns (2 single-action revolvers, 1 lever-action rifle chambered in pistol caliber, and 1 side-by-side double-barreled shotgun). Single action semi-automatic firearms, also known as self-cocking firearms, are also allowed in special military cavalry and Wild Bunch events (named after the 1969 Western movie of the same name that used more modern firearms). In general, firearm designs and the modern replicas used in the sport are of the pre-1900 American West and Military eras.

All events, whether for Old West living history or shooting competitions, are directed by a certified mounted range officer who must be knowledgeable of firearm safety, event organization, and horsemanship. The direction of a mounted range officer helps to ensure the safety of the competitor, spectators and volunteers at all events.

== Attire ==
In the early years, mounted shooting competitors were required to wear clothing of the American West, classic B-Western movies, or military cavalry uniforms of any time period or country. Today, the most that are required is modern cowboy clothing with chinks or chaps, a long-sleeved shirt and a cowboy hat. The Mounted Shooters of America do not require chinks or chaps, except for showcase events at major venues.

== Competition ==
The sport is regulated by several governing bodies, including the CMSA, CSA, SASS, and MSA.

Mounted shooting requires skill in both horsemanship and shooting that is measured by competitive events; it is one of the fastest-growing equestrian sports in the nation. The objective of the sport is to shoot ten balloon targets while riding through a variety of courses using blank cartridges fired loaded into an Old West-style single-action revolvers. Mounted shooting is a high-speed, timed spectator sport in which the competitor who completes the course the fastest with the fewest misses wins.

The typical event requires two single-action revolvers, each loaded with five blank cartridges. Ten targets are arranged in a horseback riding arena. When the competitor is given a go-signal, indicating the arena is clear of people and hazards, the rider guides his horse across a timer line and engages the ten targets. When all ten targets are engaged, the rider returns across the timer line and his score is determined and recorded. The raw time of the rider is computed and penalties are added for missed targets or failure to follow the specified course or procedure, or knocking over barrels or target stands.

Shooters enter the arena one at a time. Total score times are determined by taking the raw time for the stage (or course) plus penalties and/or bonuses. Penalties include missed targets, knocked over barrels and missed course direction.

To level the field, different levels of competition exist for riders and shooters of varying abilities. For CMSA members, as an example, classifications include Senior Men's, Men's, Senior Ladies and Ladies. The classes are further divided by age, each with its own rules for safety applied.

These classes are:

- age 11 and under (may choose to shoot if qualified)
- age 12–16 Junior boy or girl
- age 16 plus Men's, Ladies or Senior Men's, Senior Ladies
- age 55 plus Men's, Ladies or Senior Men's, Senior Ladies

The MSA's classifications are Rookie, Non-Professional, Semi-Professional, and Professional. A competitor's placement in these divisions is based on the Class level as determined by SASS or CMSA when a member of these associations first joins the MSA.

Competitors advance by accumulating winning placements. Mounted Shooters are automatically moved into higher levels to maintain equitable and fair events against people of similar proven skills. MSA members begin as a Rookie and advance to higher divisions by accumulating wins. While the MSA recognizes CMSA levels upon entry into MSA and upon moving to higher levels in the CMSA, the CMSA does not currently recognize MSA members' divisions or move-ups.

== Blank ammunition and targets ==
Mounted shooting uses black powder theatrical blanks with no bullet. Companies such as Western Stage Props, Buffalo Blanks, Circle E Blanks, Lonesome Pine, and Whitehouse Blanks manufacture certified ammunition for competition. These blanks were originally used in movie production and on the theatrical stage so that flame and smoke can be seen from the muzzle of the firearm. A slow-burning powder component of the blank can break a balloon target at a range of up to 20 feet (6 m).

== Media coverage ==
Western Shooting Horse, which was later named Western Horse & Gun, by new owners, was a national newsstand publication devoted to the sport and covers the organizations, people, horses, competition, training, guns and equipment. The magazine was headquartered in Cave Creek, Arizona, and was published six times a year. The magazine suspended print publication on December 17, 2017. As of late 2018, the website is defunct.

Mounted shooting events have been featured on ESPN, TNN, Fox Sports and the Outdoor Life Network.

== See also ==
- Mounted archery
- Rodeo
