= Bullet trap =

Shooting range safety feature

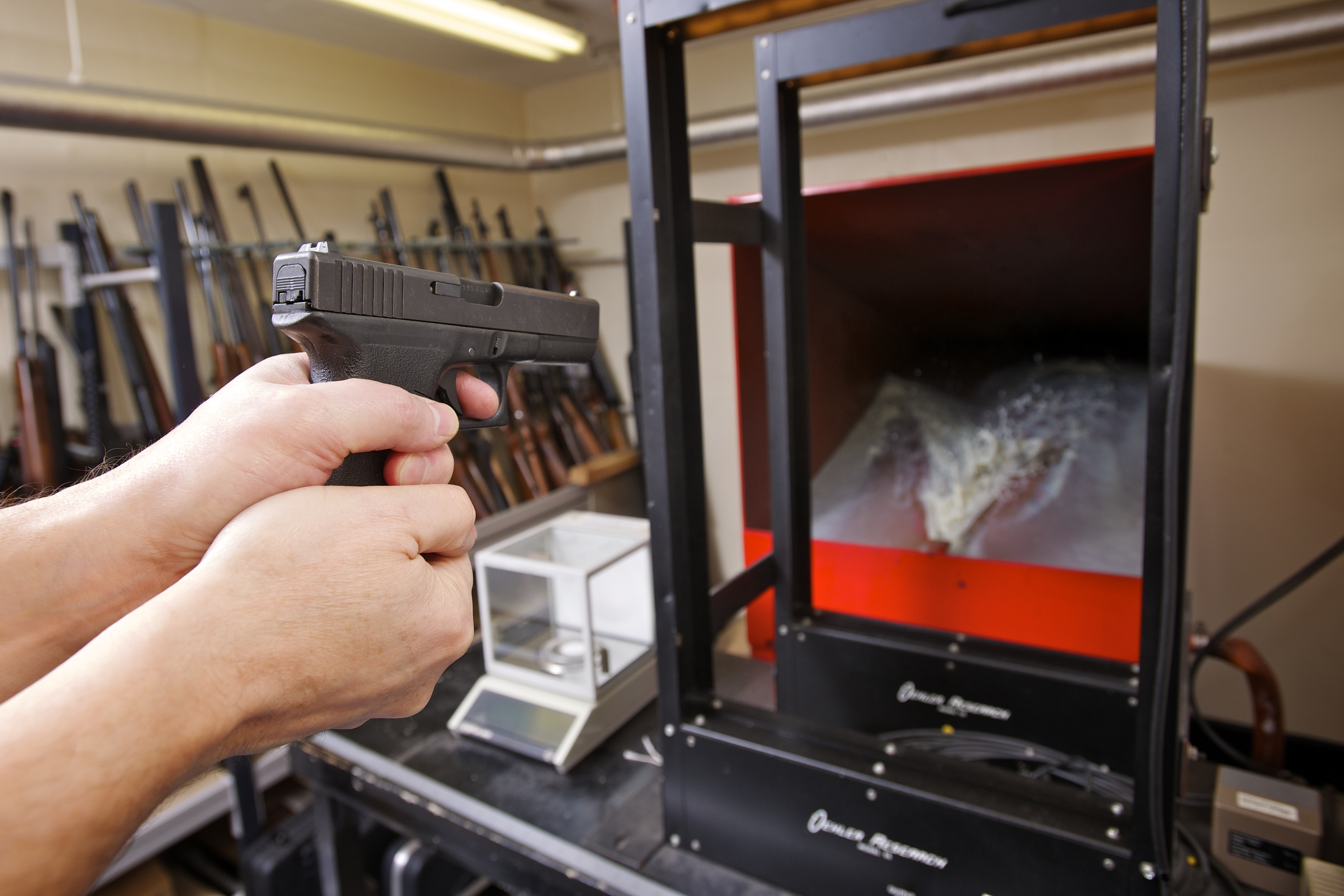
Impact bullet trap into sand

A bullet trap (or pellet trap when used specifically for air guns) is a device to stop and collect projectiles fired at a shooting range to prevent overpenetrations and stray shots. Bullet traps typically use friction, impact or gradual deceleration to stop bullets. They can function as a backstop by themselves or be part of a larger backstop, e.g. placed in front of a thick rubber wall or a bay of sand.

The bullet trap may also provide means to recycle bullet materials or prevent release of toxic heavy metals (such as lead dust from fragmented bullets) from the shooting range. Some bullet traps include a negative-pressure system to filter dust from air within the impact zone and capture area.

== Deceleration traps ==
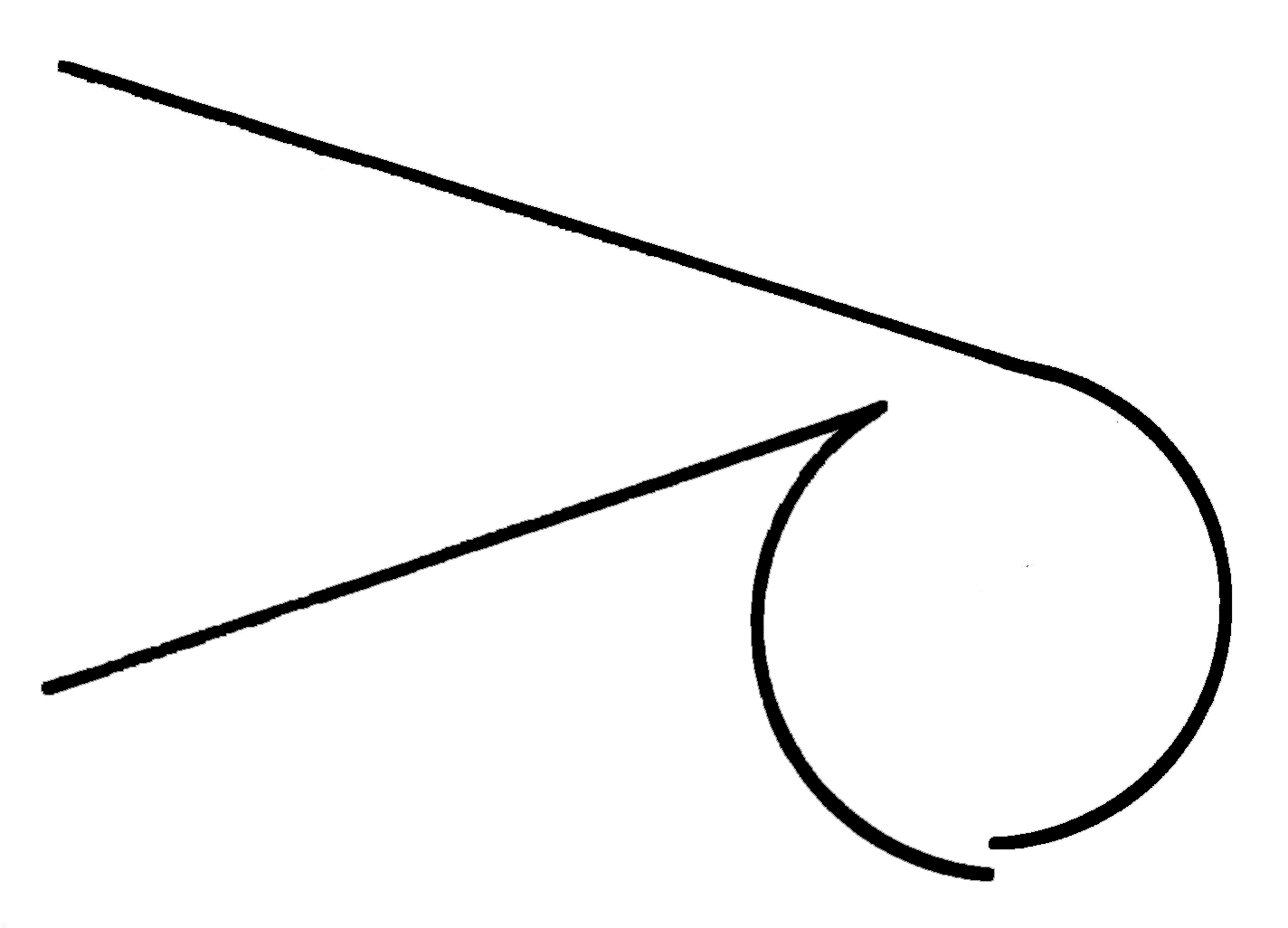
Conceptual schematic cross-section side view of a deceleration bullet trap with black lines representing steel plates: Bullets entering from the left are deflected into the top of the deceleration chamber. Bullets are then deflected clockwise around the deceleration chamber until they lose kinetic energy and fall out the bottom of the deceleration chamber.

Deceleration-type bullet traps direct bullets into a helical or circular chamber in which the bullet will slide against the curved chamber wall until it gradually loses velocity from friction and drops to the bottom of the chamber, where it can be later collected. For use with multiple firing positions, the helical chamber often resembles a horizontal pipe, into which bullets are directed by upper and lower steel plates. The upper plate slopes downward and the lower plate slopes upward to a horizontal slot in the side of the helical chamber. Alternatively, some narrow deceleration traps for single firing positions employ vertical plates to direct bullets into a helical deceleration chamber resembling a vertical pipe from which spent bullets drop out the lower end. Lightweight versions suitable for capturing airgun pellets are often used behind electronic scoring systems on ranges configured for ISSF 10 metre airgun events. The plate slopes are shallow (about 18° ) so bullets may be deflected relatively intact rather than disintegrated upon impact. Some deceleration traps use an oil or water coating to reduce friction and capture dust.

== Impact traps ==
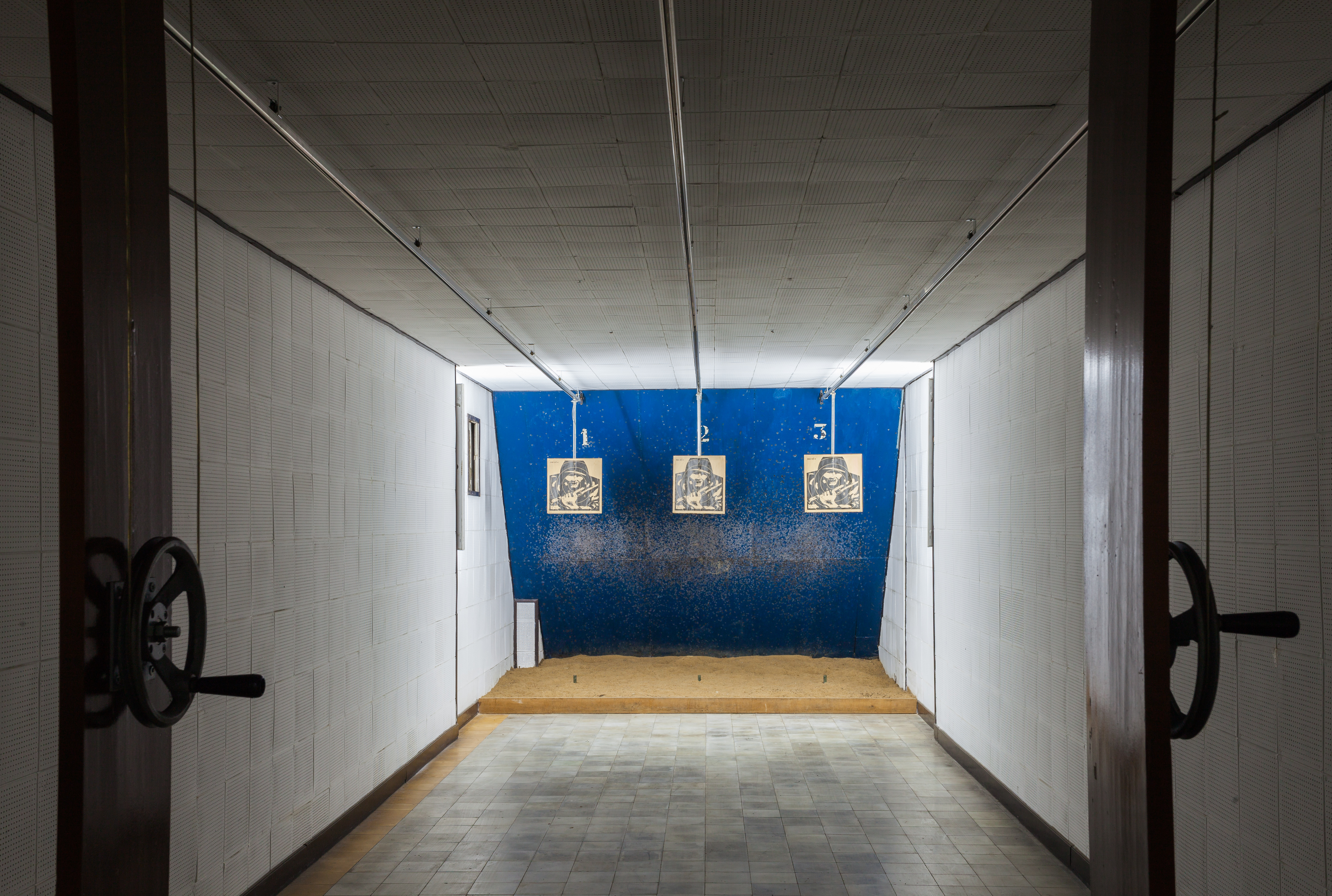
Impact bullet trap with sand, at a shooting range

Impact-type bullet traps typically use vertical or angled 500 Brinell scale steel plate at least 3/8 in (9.5 mm) thick for centrefire cartridges. Plate thickness of 0.16–0.24 inches (4–6 mm) may be adequate for rimfire ammunition. Sloping plates deflect bullets downward into sand, water or some other capture material; but the plate angle is often steep enough to largely disintegrate the bullet upon initial impact, and bullets are expected to disintegrate upon impacting vertical plates to prevent dangerous backward ricochets. Shooter protection for firing positions within 25 metres (82 ft) of the impact plate may require an anti-splash curtain of self-healing material hung in front of the plate to contain any fragments of “back splash” as well as dust. Rifle bullets may be partially melted by the energy of bullet impact. The spray of molten metal may solidify as dust, and soft lead bullets often leave a smear of lead upon impacting the steel plate. Smeared metal may be converted to additional airborne dust by subsequent bullet impact.

The popularity of vertical plate installations for indoor ranges is largely down to their minimal footprint compared with sand, granular or helical bullet traps and can consume less than 1 foot (30 cm) of a room's available length—comprising the thickness of the steel plate, the thickness of the anti-splash curtain and 10 to 11 inches of air gap between. However, sloping steel plates will tend to wear less quickly—particularly on precision target ranges where fixed targets result in fire being concentrated into small areas. In such cases, small sloping plates or sacrificial vertical wear plates may be placed behind the targets as the primary bullet trap, whilst a large vertical plate covers the remainder of the wall as the defence zone to catch errant shots. The small plates can be easily changed as frequently as necessary whilst the main back wall will need little maintenance from occasional scattered fire.

== Friction traps ==
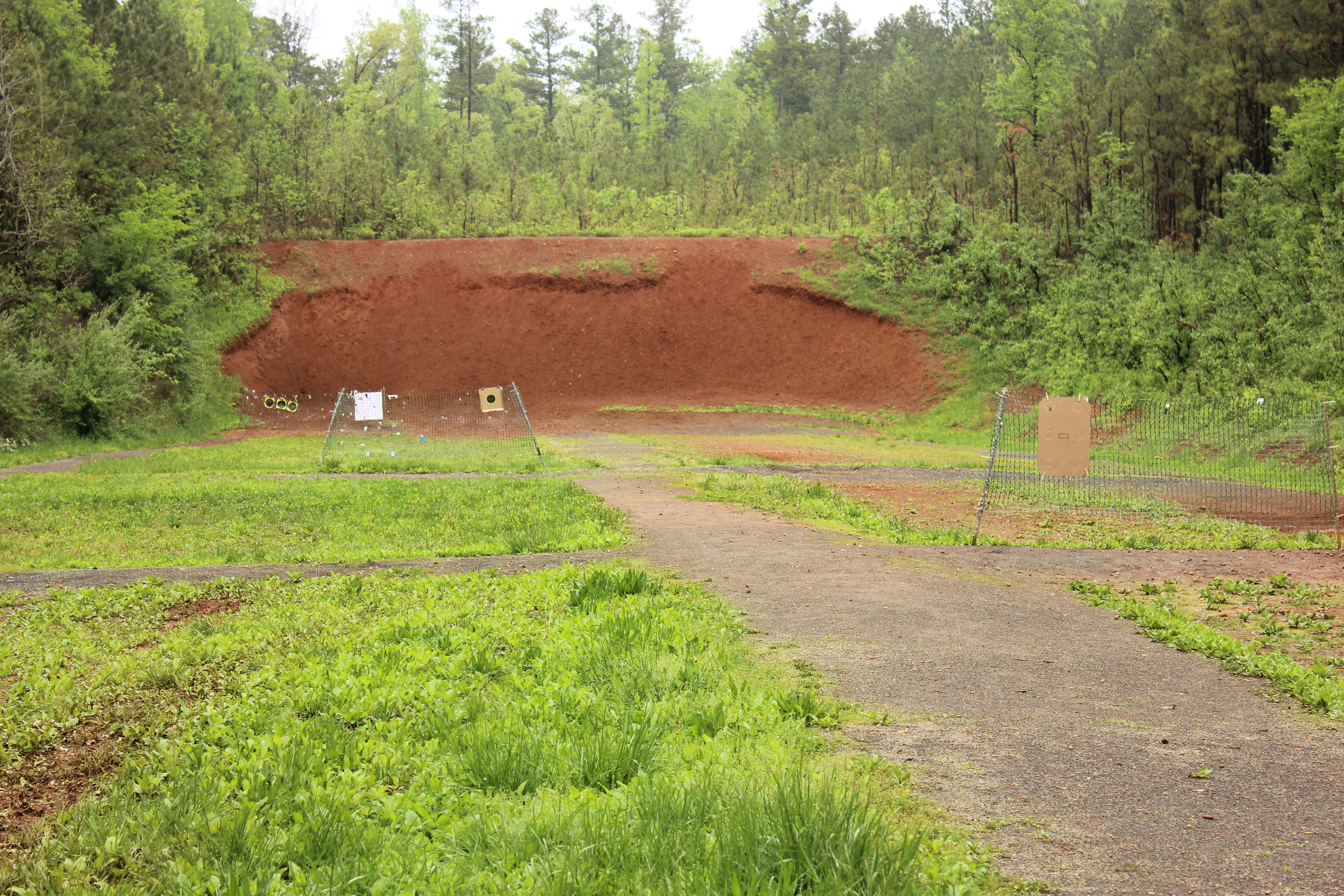
Earthen berm friction bullet trap

Friction bullet traps slow and capture the bullet more gently than steel plates. This allows more effective capture of contaminants and reduces the production of dust as well as allowing for the capture of higher energy projectiles which would wear an impact trap too quickly and necessitate uneconomical levels of maintenance.

The most common form of friction trap is a berm of granular material such as sand; earth or granulated rubber. In some circumstances a wall of railway ties, intact vehicle tires or blocks of shock-attenuating concrete (SACON) or other proprietary materials may be used. SACON is a fiber-reinforced concrete substituting expanded polystyrene beads for gravel aggregate.

For ISSF 50 metre rifle events, individual bullet traps comprising a metal box filled with plastic beads are often used behind the electronic scoring systems used for such events. Such systems require less space than earthen berms whilst being quieter than steel impact or deceleration traps, which can be a significant consideration for urban outdoor range complexes.

Individual bullet traps of this nature would typically be backed by a concrete wall to protect from negligent discharges or mechanical failures causing a bullet to miss the target entirely but which is not expected to be struck during the course of normal firing. Intact vehicle tyres are generally only suitable for higher energy projectiles which will easily penetrate their surface. Handgun bullets and shotgun pellets may ricochet back. Granulated rubber (often from shredded tires) is a convenient capture material from which bullets may be separated by gravity during agitation by subsequent bullet impact.

== Weapon unloading facility ==
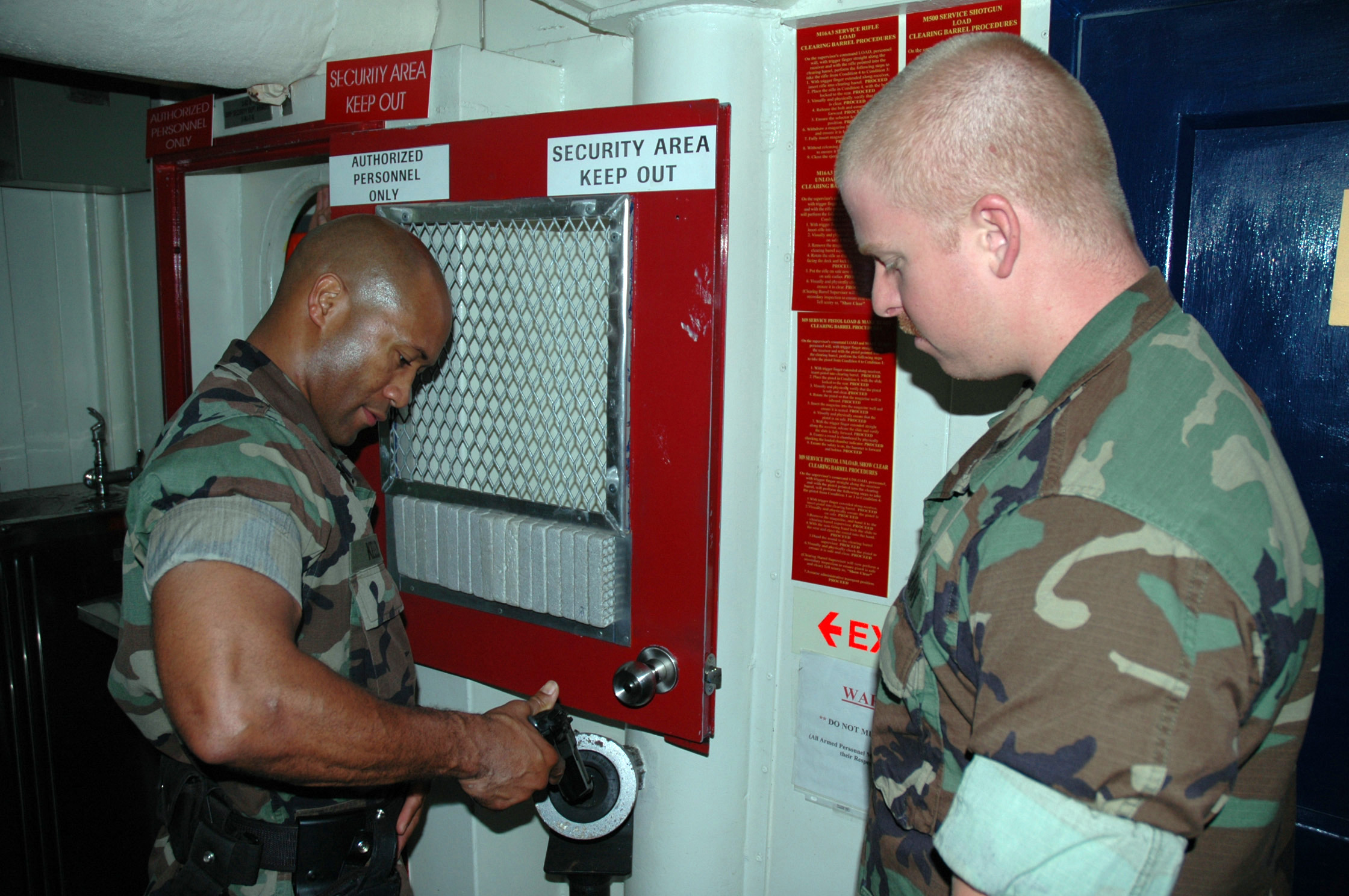
Weapons clearing station aboard a US naval vessel.

A weapon unloading facility (or weapon clearing station) is an area provided for loading or unloading firearms safely, for instance when a patrol returns to a base, or a guard returns their firearm to an armoury after their duty.

Usually comprising a deceleration trap ("snail trap") or a sand-filled box, the firearm is aimed into the facility whilst loading and unloading. A discharge will be safely contained in the event of a mechanical failure during loading, or a procedural error during unloading that leaves a round chambered.

== See also ==
- Glossary of firearms terms
- List of established military terms
