= Form (exercise) =

Safe and beneficial way of performing an exercise

See Kata for "form" in the context of martial arts.

Form is a specific way of performing a movement, often a strength training exercise, to avoid injury and maximize benefit.

== Purposes ==
Exercises or drills in sport have recognized ways of performing movements for two purposes:

=== Avoiding injury ===
By using good and proper form, the risk of injury is lowered. A lack of proper form commonly results in injury or a lack of effect from the exercise being performed

=== Maximizing benefit ===
Good form ensures that the movement only uses the main muscles, and avoids recruiting secondary muscles. As a muscle fatigues, the body attempts to compensate by recruiting other muscle groups and transferring force generation to non-fatigued units. This reduces the benefits in strength or size gain experienced by the muscles as they are not worked to failure.
