= Dummy round =

Ammunition type used for training

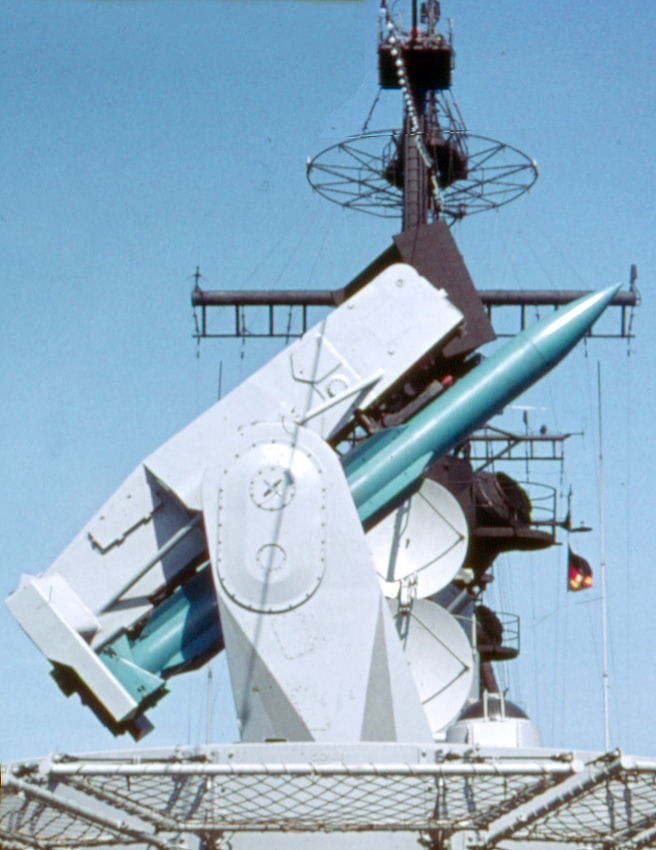
Blue-painted Tartar missile Guided Missile Training Round on a Mk 13 naval launcher

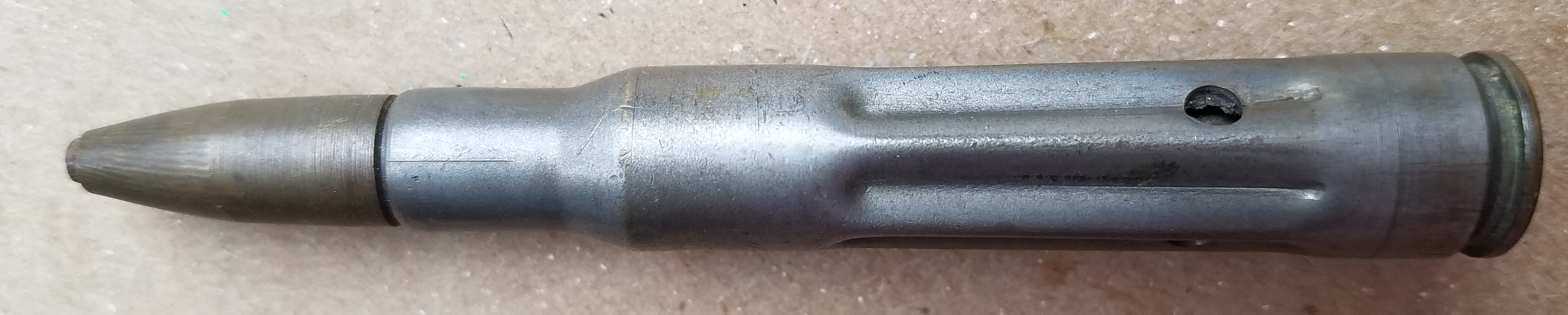
Military rifle drill round with fluted, perforated, and tin-plated case to distinguish it from a live cartridge.

A dummy round or drill round is a round that is completely inert, i.e., contains no primer, propellant, or explosive charge (filling). It is used to check weapon function and for crew training. Dummy ammunition is distinct from "practice" ammunition, which may contain smaller than normal amounts of propellant and/or explosive. For example, the M69 practice hand grenade emits a loud pop and a puff of white smoke.

A dummy is not to be confused with a blank, a cartridge for a firearm that contains propellant and a primer but no bullet or shot; a dummy does not produce an explosive sound like a blank does.

== See also ==
- Dud
- Snap cap
