= Jason Agius =

Australian actor

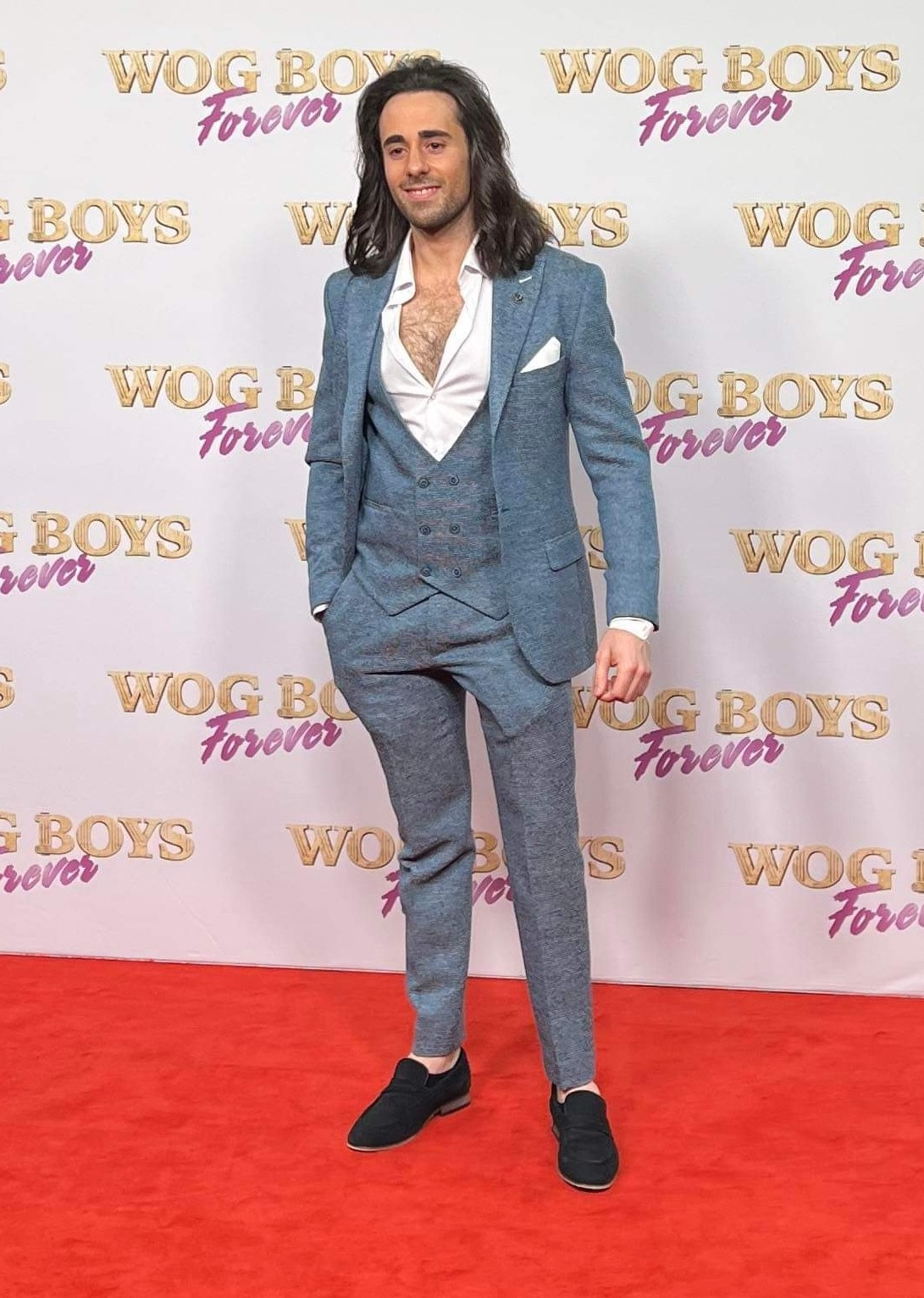
- Jason Agius at the Wog Boys Forever world premiere
- Born: Jason Agius; Australia
- Occupation: Actor
- Years active: 2012-present

Jason Agius is an Australian actor best known for his role as Dr. Sam Harvey in the Logie-nominated drama Dear Life, George in Wog Boys Forever and as Nikos Aristides in Newton's Law.

== Career ==
In 2012, Agius made his television debut in Southern Star's Tangle, playing a "Fighter Mate" of Lincoln Younes's Romeo. He then appeared in a number of television pilots and short films, including Penny, alongside The Saddle Club alum Lara Jean Marshall.

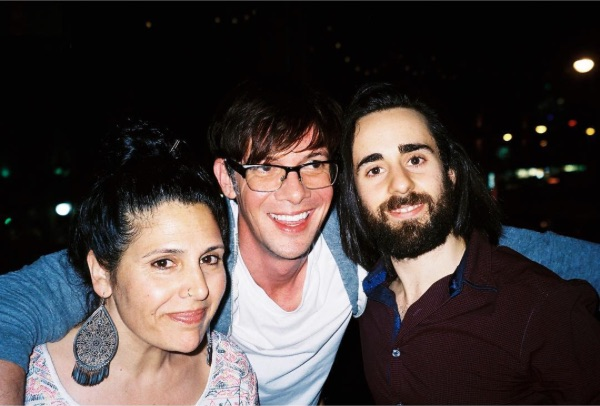
Jason Agius, Toby Schmitz, and Georgina Naidu

Agius made his feature film debut in AACTA-nominated The Death and Life of Otto Bloom, alongside Xavier Samuel and Rachel Ward, produced by Mish Armstrong, Alicia Brown, and Oscar-winning producer Melanie Coombs. Otto Bloom was selected to open the 65th Melbourne International Film Festival in 2016. Agius was then cast in Newton's Law (2017) alongside Claudia Karvan, Toby Schmitz, and Sean Keenan.

In May 2018, Agius appeared in the ABC comedy documentary Corey White's Roadmap to Paradise in sketches related to the world's problems, as seen by comedian Corey White.

In 2022, Agius appeared as George in the Wog Boy sequel, Wog Boys Forever, alongside Nick Giannopoulos, which went on to become the second-highest grossing Australian film of 2022 at the domestic box office. In the same year, it was announced that Agius had co-written feature film Little Europe with AFI-winning filmmaker Franco Di Chiera, who will also direct. It is based on true events surrounding the Bonegilla Migrant Reception and Training Centre.

In 2026, Agius appeared opposite Eleanor Matsuura, Brooke Satchwell and Ryan Johnson as Sam Harvey in Dear Life for Gristmill/Stan. On 22 June 2026, Dear Life was nominated for three Logie awards including Best Drama.

== Selected filmography ==
Year	Title	Role	Notes
2012	Tangle	Romeo Fighter Mate	
2013	Penny	Timmy	Short
2016	The Death and Life of Otto Bloom	Young Bob Simkin	
2017	Newton's Law	Nikos Aristides	
2018	Corey White's Roadmap to Paradise	Jameson	
2022	Wog Boys Forever	George	
2026	Dear Life	Sam Harvey	
202?	Little Europe		Writer
