= Wog =

Derogatory and racially offensive word

Wog is slang to refer, in British English, to Black and South Asian people, and, in Australian English, to people from the Mediterranean region. Whilst extremely derogatory in British English, in Australian English it is not always meant in an offensive way depending on how the word is used. In the United Kingdom, it has usually been employed against people of black and South Asian origin or descent and maritime Southeast Asia and less typically to those from the Middle East and North Africa. It is generally considered similar to other racially abusive terms such as dago for Italians and Spaniards, spic for Hispanic and Latin American people or wop for Italians.

In Australia, wog mostly refers to people from the Mediterranean region. This includes Southern European, Southeast European (Balkans) or MENA ethnicity, descent, and appearance, such as Italians, Greeks, Spaniards, Portuguese, Maltese, Serbian, Croatian, Macedonian and Lebanese or other Arab Australians. The word became widely diffused in Australia with an increase in immigration from Southern Europe and the Levant after the Second World War, and the term expanded to include all immigrants from the Mediterranean region and the Middle East. These new arrivals were perceived by the majority population as contrasting with Anglo-Celtic Australians. In contemporary times, since the 1980’s, the word has lost much of its negative connotations in Australia in certain contexts due to references in pop culture and a sense of affection built into its usage by many Australians and its intended recipients.

== Origin ==
The origin of the term is unclear. It was first noted by lexicographer F.C. Bowen in 1929, in his Sea Slang: a dictionary of the old-timers’ expressions and epithets, where he defines wogs as "lower class Babu shipping clerks on the Indian coast." Many dictionaries say "wog" probably derives from the golliwog, a blackface minstrel doll character from a children's book, The Adventures of Two Dutch Dolls and a Golliwogg by Florence Kate Upton, published in 1895; or from pollywog, a dialect term for tadpole that is used in maritime circles to indicate someone who has not crossed the equator.

Suggestions that the word is an acronym for "wily Oriental gentleman", "western orientated gentleman" "working on government service", or similar, are perhaps examples of false etymology or backronyms.

== Use in British English ==
"Wog", in its modern usage in the UK, is a derogatory and racially offensive slang word referring to a dark skinned person, including people from the Middle East, North Africa, the Indian subcontinent, and other parts of Asia such as the East Indies, but usually not those from the Mediterranean area or Southern Europe. Historically, the term also encompassed Southern Europeans and other such people with slightly darker skin tone than ethnically British people. A similar term, wop, has historically been used to refer to Italians in both Britain and the United States.

The saying, "The wogs begin at Calais", which implies that everyone who is not British is a wog, appears to date from the First World War but was popularised by George Wigg, Labour MP for Dudley, in 1949 when in a parliamentary debate concerning the Burmese, Wigg shouted at the Conservative benches, "The Honourable Gentleman and his friends think they are all 'wogs'. Indeed, the Right Honourable Member for Woodford [i.e., Winston Churchill] thinks that the 'wogs' begin at Calais."

As reported by English-Jewish journalist Linda Grant, the term has been used in England to refer to Jews and Israelis as well.

In 1969, the term was used on official police paperwork by Leeds City Police officers to describe the Nigerian British man David Oluwale; two officers were later found guilty of his assault and are also believed to be responsible for his death. This inspired the title of Kester Aspden's book on the case, Nationality: Wog, The Hounding of David Oluwale.

=== In popular culture ===
In Series 1 Episode 6 of Fawlty Towers, "The Germans", Major Gowen specifies "wog" as meaning any person from India when speaking to Basil Fawlty about the India vs England cricket game at The Oval. It is used by several characters in the classic epic film, Lawrence of Arabia, to refer to ‘Arabs’ from various groups uniting to fight the Turks during World War I.

== Use in Australian English ==
In Australia, the term "wog" refers to residents of Southern European, Southeast European or MENA ethnicity and/or appearance. The slur became widely diffused with an increase in immigration from Southern Europe and the Levant after the Second World War and the term expanded to include immigrants from the Mediterranean region and the Middle East. These new arrivals were perceived by the majority population as contrasting with the larger predominant Anglo-Celtic Australian culture.

Today, "wog" is used particularly in places in Australia with substantial numbers of Southern European Australians, as well as non-European Middle Eastern populations, such as in Sydney and Melbourne. As with other slang and profanity used in contemporary Australian English, the term "wog" may be employed either aggressively or affectionately in different contexts.

In Australian English, "wog" can also be used as a slang word for an illness such as a common cold or influenza, as in: "I'm coming down with a wog". Such usage is not perceived as derogatory.

=== In popular culture ===
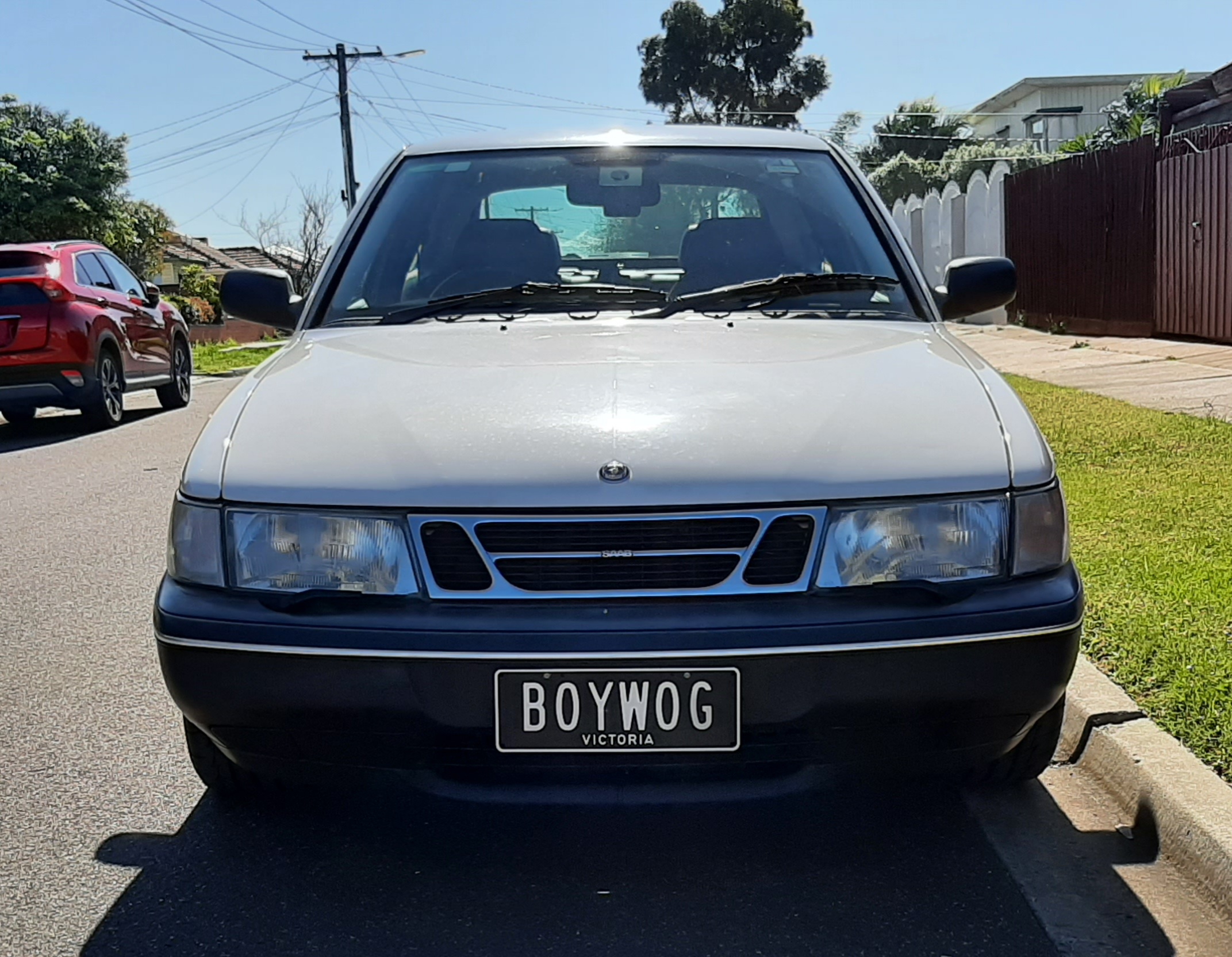
A personalised licence plate making light of the term, referencing the film The Wog Boy

More recently, Southern European-Australian performing artists have taken ownership of the term "wog", defusing its original pejorative nature. The popular 1980s stage show Wogs Out of Work, created by Nick Giannopoulos and Simon Palomares, and its sequel Who Let the Wogs Out? are early examples. The original production was followed on television with Acropolis Now, starring Giannopoulos, Palomares, George Kapiniaris and Mary Coustas, and films such as The Wog Boy and Wog Boy 2: Kings of Mykonos, and parodies such as those of Santo Cilauro (Italian), Eric Bana (Croatian-German), Vince Colosimo (Italian), Nick Giannopoulos (Greek), Frank Lotito (Italian), Mary Coustas (Greek), comedy duo Superwog (Egyptian and Greek), comedy troupe Sooshi Mango (Italian) and SBS Television's offbeat Pizza by Paul Fenech (Maltese) and later Here Come the Habibs. TV series have continued this change in Australian cultural history—with some even classifying a genre of "wogsploitation" of pop culture products being created by and for a proudly "wog" market. More recently, a popular production, 'Superwog' - created by Theodore and Nathan Saidden - has begun streaming on the Australian Broadcasting Corporation. The series began as a YouTube sketch series and has since become very popular among Australian teens. Recent works of the genre have been used by Australians of non-English speaking backgrounds to assert ethnic identity rather than succumb to ethnic stereotypes. Upon the release of Wog Boy 2, Giannopoulos discussed the contemporary use of the term "wog" in the Australian context:

I think by defusing the word 'wog' we've shown our maturity and our great ability to adapt and just laugh things off, you know... When I first came [to Greece] and I started trying to explain to them why we got called 'wog' they'd get really angry about it, you know. They were, "Why? Why they say this about the Greek people?" You know? But then when they see what we've done with it—and this is the twist—that we've turned it into a term of endearment, they actually really get into that...

Thus, in contemporary Australia, the term "wog" may, in certain contexts, be viewed as a "nickname" rather than a pejorative term—akin to the nicknames ascribed within Australian English to other historically significant cultural groupings such as Australians ("Skips"), the English ("Poms"), the Americans ("Yanks" or "Seppos") and New Zealanders ("Kiwis").

== Other uses ==
Israeli soldier sleeping under graffiti that refers to Arabs as "wogs" during the 1948 Palestine War

=== Central Intelligence Agency ===
Duane Clarridge, a former CIA officer, explained that the term "wog factor" was used by the CIA "to acknowledge that the motivations that shape decision-making in North Africa, the Middle East, and the Indian subcontinent are very different from our own."

=== Scientology ===
The word "wog" is derogatorily used by Scientologists to refer to unenlightened non-Scientologists, derived by Scientology founder L. Ron Hubbard from the UK racial slur.

=== Randy Newman ===
In the 1972 song "Sail Away" by Randy Newman, a slave trader trying to convince an African person to sail to America with the slaver refers to the African as a "little wog".

== See also ==
- List of ethnic slurs
- Dago (slur)
- Kanake
