= Tony Nikolakopoulos =

Australian actor

- Born: Melbourne, Victoria, Australia
- Education: Deakin University
- Occupations: Actor, writer, director
- Years active: 1986–present
- Known for: The Wog Boy; The Wannabes; Scooter: Secret Agent; Head On; Alex & Eve
- Spouse: Julia Hosie

Tony Nikolakopoulos is an Australian film, theatre and television actor.

== Early life ==
Nikolakopoulos was born in Melbourne, Victoria to parents hailing from southern Greece. He attended Rusden College (now Deakin University) for five years, where he completed a Bachelor of Education. The year after he graduated, he was asked to return to the school to teach drama classes and direct several productions for six years.

== Career ==
Nikolakopoulos has appeared in many television series, feature films and short films. He is best known for his work in the comedy films of Nick Giannopoulos, including The Wog Boy franchise (2000, 2010 and 2022), in which he starred as Theo and The Wannabes (2003) as Stewie, alongside Isla Fisher. He is also known for his role as Attilio in the television series Scooter: Secret Agent.

After leaning towards a career in directing after his teaching stint at Deakin University, Nikolakopoulos' passion for acting was reignited when he landed a role in his first feature film, the critically-acclaimed 1998 drama Head On. He appeared opposite Alex Dimitriades, playing the role of his 55-year old father, Dimitri, when he was only 31. In 2000, he then originated the role of neck-brace wearing Theo in the first of The Wog Boy films, alongside Nick Giannopoulos and Vince Colosimo.

Further film appearances came with 2003 buddy action-comedy film Kangaroo Jack, with Jerry O’Connell and Christopher Walken. Then in 2005, he acted alongside Jimeoin in comedy feature The Extra and with Sigrid Thornton in television film Little Oberon.

In 2010, Nikolakopoulos reprised his role as Theo in the second installment of The Wog Boy movie franchise, The Kings of Mykonos. He later played the lead role of Alan Figg in 2014 crime drama The Legend Maker. That same year, he appeared in sci-fi film Predestination, opposite Ethan Hawke, Sarah Snook and Noah Taylor. Following this, were roles in Alex & Eve (2015) as George, Joe Cinque’s Consolation (2016) as Nino Cinque and West of Sunshine (2017) as Banos. The third film in The Wog Boy trilogy, Wog Boys Forever, allowed Nikolakopoulos to reprise his role as Theo once more in 2022.

Nikolakopoulos also has numerous television credits to his name. After making guest appearances in series including Blue Heelers, SeaChange, State Coroner, Stingers and Pizza, he landed the regular role of Attilio in children's series Scooter: Secret Agent in 2005. An ongoing role as Cannonball Bob in children's series Pirate Islands: The Lost Treasure of Fiji followed in 2007, before he played the recurring role of Andrew 'Benji' Veniamin’s father in the first season of Underbelly.

More television guest roles followed, in All Saints, East West 101, City Homicide, Tangle, Rush, American war drama miniseries The Pacific, Killing Time, Small Time Gangster, Offspring, Reef Doctors, The Doctor Blake Mysteries, The Time of Our Lives and Please Like Me. Nikolakopoulos then appeared in another Underbelly spin-off – the miniseries Fat Tony & Co. playing Stavros Makrakanis, before landing a recurring role in prison drama Wentworth from 2014 to 2016, as Nils Jesper.

Nikolakopoulos made further guest appearances in Here Come the Habibs, 2018 miniseries Olivia Newton-John: Hopelessly Devoted to You, Utopia, Jack Irish with Guy Pearce and The Tourist, playing Nico, opposite Jamie Dornan. His most recent recurring roles include playing Fat George in autobiographical underworld crime drama Last King of the Cross in 2023 and a voice role as Grandpa in animated children's series Tales From Outer Suburbia, which began airing in January 2026.

Nikolakopoulos has also acted in numerous theatre productions, beginning with a performance in Ignatious Rodney Timms at Victoria College, Melbourne in 1986. Over the course of his career, he has appeared for La Mama, Melbourne Theatre Company and State Theatre Company of South Australia and has performed in productions of the classics including The Crucible, Waiting for Godot and Hamlet.

In 1996, Nikolakopoulos toured nationally in Wog and His Mates and between 2000 and 2005, he performed in Roulette, across both Australia and in Portugal with Ranters Theatre Company. From 2007 to 2008, he was part of the cast in a production of The Spook that toured Victoria. He played the role of Stavrakis in Cafe Rebetika in 2009 and again in 2011. From 2019 to 2020, he appeared in a national touring production of Anthem.

Nikolakopoulos has also directed over a hundred theatre productions for Stage School Australia, Victorian Youth Theatre and his own production company KT Productions. In 2023, he wrote and directed the play Life of Byron.

In 2025, together with his brother Peter, Nikolakopoulos co-founded the Performing Star Academy, a children's creative arts, performance, and sports academy, with Nikolakopoulos overseeing performance and Peter running the AllStars Academy sports division.

In addition to his teaching stint at Deakin University, Nikolakopoulos has worked as an acting and drama lecturer/teacher at University of Melbourne's Victorian College of the Arts.

== Personal life ==
Nikolakopoulos is married to clinical psychologist, Dr Julia Hosie.

== Awards ==
Year	Work	Award	Category	Result	Ref
	296 Smith Street	Melbourne International Film Festival		Won	

== Filmography ==
=== Television ===
Year	Title	Role	Notes	Ref
1995	Janus	Lou De Luca	1 episode	
1997–2002	Blue Heelers	Trevor / Stavros	2 episodes	
1998	SeaChange	Rodney	1 episode	
1998	State Coroner	Theo	1 episode	
1999–2003	Stingers	Milos / Stipanic	2 episodes	
2001	Pizza		1 episode	
2002	White Collar Blue	Stavros	TV movie	
2004	The Brush-Off	Mavramoustakides	TV movie	
2005	The Glenmoore Job	Sergeant	TV movie	
2005	Little Oberon	Baker	TV movie	
2005	Holly's Heroes	Franco's Dad	2 episodes	
2005	Scooter: Secret Agent	Attilio	24 episodes	
2007	Kick	Hakim	1 episode	
2007	Pirate Islands: The Lost Treasure of Fiji	Cannonball Bob	13 episodes	
2008	Underbelly	Veniamin father	3 episodes	
2008	All Saints	Dominic	2 episodes	
2009	East West 101	Omar	2 episodes	
2009	Whatever Happened to That Guy?	Nick	1 episode	
2009	City Homicide	Jackson Pittman	1 episode	
2009–2010	Tangle	Gordon	3 episodes	
2010	Rush	Edward	1 episode	
2010	Lowdown	George	1 episode	
2010	The Pacific	Baba Karamanlis	Miniseries, 1 episode	
2011	Killing Time	Manny the Mutt	2 episodes	
2011	Small Time Gangster	Glen	1 episode	
2013	Offspring	Harry	1 episode	
2013	Reef Doctors	Barry	1 episode	
2013	The Doctor Blake Mysteries	Nick Manos	1 episode	
2013–2014	The Time of Our Lives	Anton	2 episodes	
2014	Please Like Me	Cleaner	1 episode	
2014	Fat Tony & Co.	Stavros Makrakanis	3 episodes	
2014	Altruman		Miniseries	
2014–2016	Wentworth	Nils Jesper	9 episodes	
2016	Here Come the Habibs	Jiddo	2 episodes	
2017	Fancy Boy	Alfonse	1 episode	
2018	True Story with Hamish & Andy	Brother Michaels	1 episode	
2018	Olivia Newton-John: Hopelessly Devoted to You	Artie Mogull	Miniseries, 1 episode	
2018	Drama Club	Faruk	Miniseries	
2019	Utopia	Mr Papagenous	1 episode	
2020	AussieWood	Hakim Khan	TV series	
2021	Jack Irish	Stavros	1 episode	
2022	The Tourist	Nico	Miniseries, 1 episode	
2023	Last King of the Cross	Fat George	3 episodes	
2026	Tales From Outer Suburbia	Grandpa	7 episodes	

=== Film ===
Year	Title	Role	Notes	Ref.
1996	Life	Prison Officer 3	Feature film	
1998	Head On	Dimitri	Feature film	
2000	Nameday		Short film	
2000	The Wog Boy	Theo	Feature film	
2001	Beggar		Short film	
2002	Magda		Short film	
2003	Kangaroo Jack	Sal's Capo	Feature film	
2003	The Wannabes (aka Criminal Ways)	Stewie	Feature film	
2003	Alice	Computer Service Man	Short film	
2004	Tom White	Sergeant	Feature film	
2005	The Extra	Tony (bouncer)	Feature film	
2005	The Drop	The Driver	Short film	
2006	Forged	Sargon	Short film	
2007	The Independent	Tony Bentakis	Feature film	
2008	296 Smith Street	Ahmed	Short film	
2009	Imprint	Bus Driver	Short film	
2009	One Night	Taxi Driver	Short film	
2009	Beware of Black Dog!	Max / Wolf / Landlord (voices)	Animated short film	
2009	Bad Language	Kosta	Short film	
2010	Wog Boy 2: Kings of Mykonos	Theo	Feature film	
2011	Absence	Father	Short film	
2011	Joey	Tony	Short film	
2011	Exit	Shopkeeper	Feature film	
2011	Big Mamma's Boy	Butcher	Feature film	
2012	Mother's Day	Alex	Short film	
2013	Let Go	Peter	Short film	
2014	Predestination	Driver	Feature film	
2014	The Rack and the Screw	Lucas	Short film	
2014	Rigor Mortis	Chris	Short film	
2014	The Legend Maker	Alan Figg	Feature film	
2015	Alex & Eve	George	Feature film	
2015	Match	Tony	Short film	
2016	Dream of a Shadow	Tony	Feature film	
2016	Joe Cinque’s Consolation	Nino Cinque	Feature film	
2017	West of Sunshine	Banos	Feature film	
2017	Theodore's Gift	Theodore	Short film	
2018	Sad Sachs	Tony Varoufakis	Short film	
2021	Container		Short film	
2022	Wog Boys Forever	Theo	Feature film	
2023	Finally Me	Mr Mitsos	Feature film	
2025	Repose		Short film	

== Theatre ==
=== As actor ===
Year	Title	Role	Venue / Company	Ref.
1986	Ignatious Rodney Timms		Victoria College, Melbourne	
1988	The Bride of Gospel Place		Victoria College, Melbourne	
1990	The Crucible		Victoria College, Melbourne	
1991	Let Gypsies	Tom	St Martins Theatre, Melbourne	
1991	Beat the Savage Drum	Executioner		
1992	Deathwatch	Marcel	La Mama, Melbourne	
1993	Waiting for Godot	Pozzo		
1996	Wog and His Mates	M.C. Gianni	Australian national tour	
1996–1997	Honeymoon in Hellas	Joshua / MC		
1998	Legacy		La Mama, Melbourne	
1999	The Courtyard of Miracles	Stelios	Playhouse Adelaide with STCSA	
2000–2005	Roulette	Theo / Terri	Australia & Portugal tour with Ranters Theatre Company	
2001	Wog Story	Various characters	Enmore Theatre, Sydney	
2001	Blue Absence		Yeltza Bar, Melbourne with Theatre Camaleon	
2007	Brother Boy	Greek father	Dog Theatre, Melbourne	
2007–2008	The Spook	George	VIC tour	
2008	Las Vegas (Confidential) The Musical	Tony the Tool	State Theatre, Sydney	
2009	August: Osage County	Sheriff	Playhouse, Melbourne with MTC	
2009; 2011	Cafe Rebetika!	Stavrakis	Arts Centre Melbourne, Sydney Opera House	
2011	Hamlet		Southbank Theatre, Melbourne with MTC	
2012	Pompeii, L.A.	Various characters	Malthouse Theatre, Melbourne	
2018	Astroman	Alex Pavlis	Fairfax Studio, Melbourne with MTC	
2019–2020	Anthem	Store Owner	Australian tour with MTC	
2024	The Big Fat Greek Comedy & Music Variety Show		Sydney & Melbourne tour	

=== As director ===
Year	Title	Role	Venue / Company	Ref.
1991	Troy is Burning	Director	Victoria College, Melbourne	
1992	Lysistrata	Director / Choreographer	Deakin University, Melbourne	
1992	The Skin of Our Teeth	Director	Deakin University, Melbourne	
1993	Rhinoceros	Director	Deakin University, Melbourne	
1993	Here Comes a Chopper	Director / Teacher	Deakin University, Melbourne	
1994	5 A Season of Plays: Deathwatch	Director	Carlton Courthouse, Melbourne with Wintercourt Productions	
2010	Baraki 2010	Director	Take Away Theatre Theatre, Sydney	
	The Last Proxy	Director / Producer	Australian tour	
2023	Life of Byron	Producer / director / writer	Alex Theatre, Melbourne, Fusebox, Sydney	
2023	Borneo Plus 3: Borneo, Legacy, Petroleum, Night	Director	Victorian College of the Arts	
