= Wog Boys Forever =

2022 Australian comedy film

- Theatrical poster
- Directed by: Frank Lotito
- Written by: Nick Giannopoulos
- Produced by: Nelson Khoury; Nick Giannopoulos
- Starring: Nick Giannopoulos; Vince Colosimo; Costas Kilias; Annabel Marshall-Roth; Sarah Roberts
- Cinematography: Craig Barden
- Music by: Mark D'Angelo; Nick West
- Production companies: G.O. Films
- Distributed by: Kismet
- Release date: 6 October 2022
- Running time: 102 minutes
- Countries: Australia; Greece
- Languages: English; Greek; Italian
- Budget: $5 million
- Box office: AU$1.9 million

Wog Boys Forever is a 2022 Australian comedy film and the third installment in the Wog Boy trilogy. The film is written by the franchise creator Nick Giannopoulos, and directed by Frank Lotito. The film was preceded by two movies in the franchise, The Wog Boy (2000) and Wog Boy 2: Kings of Mykonos (2010).

== Plot ==
Steve Karamitsis is an awkward and a depressed, Greek Australian man who drives taxis for a living. He lives in Melbourne’s inner north, and in his 50s, is still recovering from a break up with his ex Zoe (Zeta Makripoulia as portrayed in The Wog Boy 2: Kings of Mykonos). He once again finds himself in challenging circumstances, but is assisted out of these by his friend Frank (Vince Colosimo). Steve realises he still has feelings for "the one that got away" girl Cleo (Sarah Roberts), an ex girlfriend, after she randomly hops into his taxi one day. He decides to woo her, with the help of friends, however is faced with a revenge campaign from the evil Minister for Immigration, Brianna Beagle-Thorpe (Annabel Marshall-Roth), who with her brother Clayton (Liam Seymour) to get revenge on Steve for destroying their late mother Raelene's political career (as depicted in The Wog Boy).

== Production ==
The film started production in 2019 and started shooting in Melbourne in June, 2021 Giannopoulos initially had challenges getting finance for the film as it was turned down for finance by Screen Australia. He has said the Steve character was influenced by a number of real people: "My films are pretty much based on the communities that I grew up in and people I grew up with. The main character in the Wog Boys films, Steve Karamitsis, is a combination of a great number of people I have met over the years." Frank Lotito, who directed, had worked with both Giannopolous and Colosimo on some of their stage shows, and he was given the role after Giannopoulos saw his film Growing Up Smith.

The film features a Greek ethnic style house in Reservoir, Melbourne, that the production crew had witnessed for sale in a real estate advertisement. It was granted for use by the vendor before the new owners purchased it.

== Cast ==
- Nick Giannopoulos as Steve Karamitsis
- Vince Colosimo as Frank Di Benedetto
- Sarah Roberts as Cleo
- Annabel Marshall-Roth as Brianna Beagle-Thorpe
- Liam Seymour as Clayton Beagle-Thorpe
- Anthony J. Sharpe as Goldi
- Costa D'Angelo as Michael
- Sooshi Mango as Pino, Vince and Guiseppina
- Newnest Addakula as Pardeep
- Havana Brown as Sapphire
- Derryn Hinch as himself
- Jason Agius as George
- Claudia Hruschka as Sophie
- JJ Pantano as Mario Jnr
- Tony Nikolakopoulos as Theo
- Brett Swain as Rusty Nail

== See also ==
- Cinema of Australia
- Cinema of Greece
