= Derryn Hinch =

Australian media personality and politician (1944–2026)

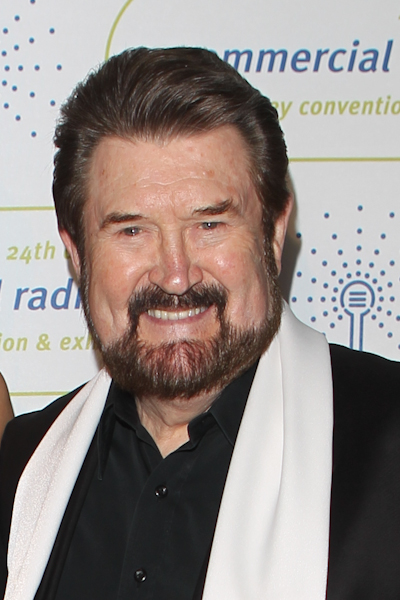
- Hinch in 2012

Leader of Derryn Hinch's Justice Party
- In office 12 October 2015 – 2 March 2023
- Deputy: Stuart Grimley
- Preceded by: Party established
- Succeeded by: Party dissolved

Senator for Victoria
- In office 2 July 2016 – 30 June 2019
- Preceded by: Ricky Muir
- Succeeded by: Jess Walsh

Personal details
- Born: Derryn Nigel Hinch; 9 February 1944 New Plymouth, New Zealand
- Died: 10 July 2026 (aged 82) Melbourne, Victoria, Australia
- Party: Derryn Hinch's Justice Party (2015–2023)
- Spouses: Lana Wells (m. 1965; div. 1970) Eve Carpenter (m. 1972; div. 1980) Jacki Weaver (m. 1983; div. 1996) (m. 1997; div. 1998) Chanel Hayton (m. 2006; div. 2012)
- Domestic partner(s): Lynda Stoner (esp. 1979; sep. 1982); Natasha Chadwick (esp. 2013; sep. Jan 2018)
- Education: New Plymouth Boys'; High School
- Occupation: News reporter: Employer(s) — Taranaki Newspapers Ltd — Fairfax Media; Television presenter: Employer(s) — News Corp Australia — Seven Network — Nine Network — Network Ten — Foxtel; Radio host: Employer(s) — 2UW — 3MP — 3XY — 3AW — 3AK
- Profession: Journalist; Politician

Derryn Nigel Hinch (9 February 1944 – 10 July 2026) was an Australian media personality, politician, actor, journalist and author. Born in New Zealand, he moved to Australia in 1963 and became known for his career on Melbourne radio and television. He served as a Senator for Victoria from 2016 to 2019.

Hinch was elected to the Senate representing Victoria as the head of Derryn Hinch's Justice Party at the 2016 federal election. Aged 72 at the time, Hinch was the oldest federal parliamentarian ever to be elected for the first time. He lost his seat in the 2019 election.

He remained host of his weekly program Hinch Live until the election campaign period officially commenced, in a decision supported by Sky News Live. He has been the host of 3AW's Drive radio show, and a National Public Affairs commentator for the Seven Network on Sunday Night, Today Tonight and Sunrise. For much of his career he was dubbed "The Human Headline" and he adopted this moniker for two of his books.

Hinch was convicted of contempt of court three times, serving two prison sentences and one sentence of house detention.

== Career ==
=== Print ===
Hinch began his career at the age of 15 with the Taranaki Herald in New Plymouth, New Zealand, in 1960. In 1963, he came to Australia on the MS Wanganella and joined The Sun in Sydney. By 1966, he had become a foreign correspondent for the Fairfax organisation, and in New York became bureau chief in 1972. He lived in New York for 11 years. Hinch returned to Sydney and was editor of The Sun from 1976 to 1977.

=== Television ===
Hinch hosted Beauty and the Beast on the Seven Network between 1982 and 1983. From 1988 to 1991, Hinch hosted his own current affairs show on the Seven Network titled Hinch at Seven, (retitled Hinch in 1989) which later moved to Network Ten where it ran from 1992 to 1994. In 1994, Hinch joined the Nine Network and hosted The Midday Show for a year. He has also appeared on Dancing with the Stars, Underbelly and Millionaire Hot Seat as a guest playing for charity.

In September 2012, Hinch rejoined the Seven Network as national public affairs commentator, though there were rumours that Hinch might make a comeback (although this never eventuated). From February 2015, Hinch hosted a twice weekly news opinion program, Hinch Live, over the weekend on Sky News Australia.

- Hinch at Seven, Seven Network 1988–1991, then 1992–1994, Network Ten
- Beauty and the Beast, Seven Network (1982–1983)
- The Midday Show, Nine Network (1994)
- Mars Venus, Foxtel (2003)
- Dancing with the Stars, Seven Network (2005)
- Underbelly, Nine Network (2008)
- Seven News, Sunrise and Sunday Night National Public Affairs Commentator, Seven Network (2012–2026)
- Hinch Live, Sky News Australia (2015–2016)

=== Radio ===
In 1978, Hinch had a morning program on 3XY. In 1979, he moved to 3AW and presented a successful morning program for eight years. In 1987, he left radio to host Hinch At Seven on television.

During the 1990s, he had a brief stint presenting a talkback radio program on Adelaide station 5DN before returning to 3AW in 2000 to host Nightline. In 2001, he began a two-year stint at 3AK before returning to 3AW to host the drive-time program in 2003. He was often absent from the programs due to suspension, poor health and house arrest. In August 2012, it was announced that Hinch's contract would not be renewed by 3AW, and he would be replaced by financial commentator Tom Elliott. He was later a Melbourne correspondent for New Zealand radio network Newstalk ZB and often presented political commentaries on the station.

In 2010 he was inducted into the Australian Commercial Radio Hall of Fame.

=== Acting ===
In 1979, Rennie Ellis photographed a shirtless Hinch reading newspapers in bed with topless model Alyson Best for Playboy. Hinch told BuzzFeed that he was broke at the time and needed the $300 fee. An interview with Hinch appeared in Australian Playboy in April 1984.

Hinch made cameo appearances on Fast Forward, which was the same sketch show where he was parodied as Hunch, played by Steve Vizard. Hinch appeared as himself, in a minor role, in the 2000 film The Wog Boy with Nick Giannopoulos, and reprised the role in its 2022 sequel, Wog Boys Forever. In September 2008, Hinch had a four-week run as The Criminologist (narrator) in the Australian tour of The Rocky Horror Show. Hinch played the role of a senator in the 2016 movie The Colour of Darkness, which was filmed two years before he actually was elected to the Australian Senate.

=== Politics ===
In 2015, Hinch established Derryn Hinch's Justice Party. He was subsequently elected to the Australian Senate as a senator for Victoria at the 2016 double dissolution election on 2 July 2016. At the age of 72, he became the second oldest new member ever elected to the Australian parliament. His party's main emphasis was on criminal justice reform, including tougher sentences for violent and sexual offenders, no bail for those accused of a serious violent offence, parole reform and a public register of sex offenders. Other positions included equal rights for all citizens regardless of race, religion or sexual orientation, tougher laws against animal cruelty and support for voluntary euthanasia. Following the announcement of the 2016 Senate election results, other senators negotiated, against Hinch's objections, to allocate him a three-year rather than a six-year Senate term.

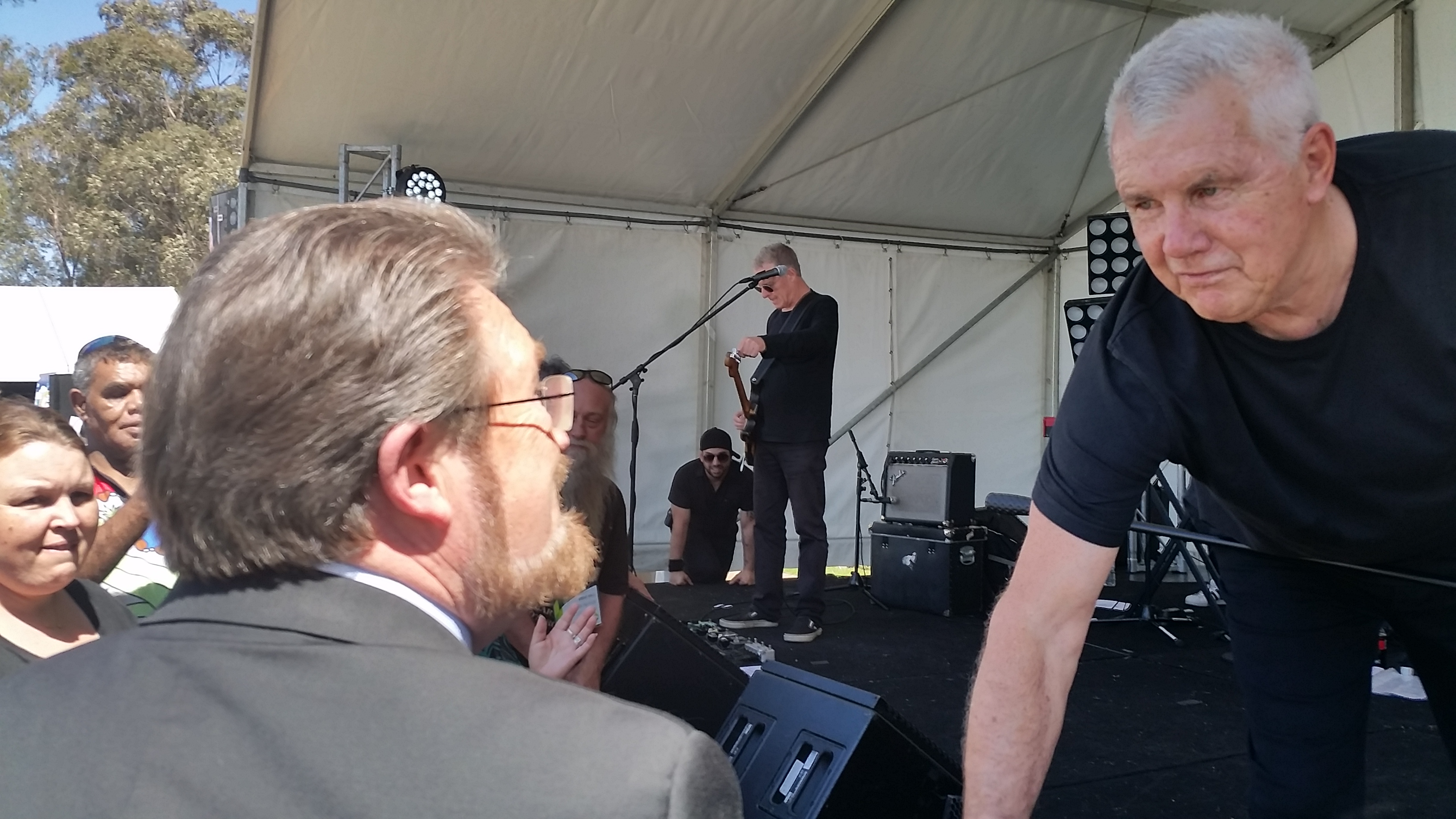
Hinch shaking hands with Daryl Braithwaite at the 2018 National Apology to Victims and Survivors of Institutional Child Sexual Abuse concert at forecourt gardens of Parliament of Australia

In August 2017, it was revealed that Hinch held an American Social Security number, raising concerns during the dual citizenship crisis that he may be disqualified from office under Section 44 of the Constitution of Australia. However, in September 2017, the Attorney-General made the decision not to refer him to the High Court.

Hinch showed support for capital punishment.

In the 2019 Australian federal election, Hinch was not re-elected to the Senate.

He contested the 2022 Victorian state election for the South-Eastern Metropolitan Region but was unsuccessful.

Hinch opposed the Indigenous Voice to Parliament.

In February 2024, Hinch announced that he would run in the 2024 Melbourne City Council election, but withdrew his bid in April 2024 saying he could not afford the costs of the campaign.

== Controversies ==
=== Michael Glennon ===
In 1985, Hinch reported that a former Roman Catholic priest, Michael Glennon, who had previously been convicted of indecent assault against a minor, was operating a youth camp while facing new charges. Hinch, was concerned that parents had been unknowingly sending their children to Glennon's camp, first appealed privately to then Victorian premier John Cain and the then-attorney-general, as well as the head of the Roman Catholic Church in Australia, but in Hinch's words, they "washed their hands" of the situation. Subsequently, Hinch publicly identified Glennon during his trial on the third set of charges, in spite of the strong sub judice rule under Australian jurisprudence. This delayed the trial while Hinch was tried on contempt of court charges; Hinch was fined $10,000 and imprisoned for twelve days. This was the first time anyone had gone to prison on a prior restraint issue in Australia. Hinch appealed his case as far as the High Court of Australia, which affirmed his conviction. In its ruling, the Court held that despite Hinch's motivation of warning the public that Glennon continued to hold a position in a youth organisation, it was sufficient to inform them of the current charges against him, and that the information about his prior conviction was prejudicial under Australian law. Hinch called the incident "the thing I'm most proud of in my life".

=== Mick Gatto's call ===
On 24 June 2008, while Hinch was discussing the celebrity status of underworld crime figures during his Drive program, Mick Gatto phoned in and had a brief confrontation with Hinch, ending with a death threat.

=== John Laws ===
On 30 July 2007, John Laws and Hinch attended the 40 Years of Radio Legends television program, after which Hinch complained that the "event had been turned into a tribute to Laws", among other comments which caused ill feelings between the two.

On 5 December 2007, Hinch was abused verbally with obscenities by Laws while dining at lunch with 2CH personality Bob Rogers in a restaurant at the Finger Wharf in Woolloomooloo, Sydney.

=== Sexual relationship with teenager ===
In his 2004 book The Fall and Rise of Derryn Hinch, and in a radio editorial in March 2005, Hinch admitted to having sex with a 15-year-old female when he was in his early thirties, although he stated he "thought she was about 25". Following his on-air admission, Herald Sun journalist Andrew Bolt called for his prosecution. In 2013, Hinch wrote that after 30 years, the woman had contacted him and said he was wrong about her age. She said she was born in 1961 and they met shortly after he joined 3AW in 1979. That made her 17 at the time of the liaison (which is above the age of consent in Australia).

== Criminal convictions ==
=== 1987 conviction and imprisonment ===
Hinch served 12 days in prison and was fined A$15,000 in 1987 for contempt of court after he publicly revealed paedophile Roman Catholic priest Michael Charles Glennon's prior conviction while a trial was still pending.

=== 2011 conviction and home detention ===
In June 2011, he was convicted of breaching suppression orders against the names of two sex offenders, and was subsequently sentenced to five months' home detention.

=== 2014 conviction and imprisonment ===
In October 2013, Hinch was found guilty of contempt of court for breaching a suppression order by revealing details of the criminal history of Jill Meagher's killer, Adrian Ernest Bayley. The judge gave Hinch 90 days to pay the fine, or else face 50 days in prison. On 16 January 2014, one day prior to the expiration of the 90-day period, Hinch advised that he would not pay the fine 'on principle'. He was imprisoned on 17 January 2014. On 7 March 2014, he was released from prison after 50 days, having served his full sentence. He was greeted by his partner Natasha Chadwick, other friends and a substantial media contingent.

== Personal life ==
Hinch was married five times to four different women. His first marriage was to Lana Wells, an editor. His second marriage was to Eve Carpenter, a flight attendant. He then married Australian actress Jacki Weaver. They married in 1993 and divorced in 1996; they remarried in 1997 and divorced in 1998. He married Chanel Hayton in February 2006 and they separated in late 2012. He had a five-year relationship with Natasha Chadwick, a former detective sergeant with NSW Police and journalist for Network Seven's Sunday Night program. Hinch and Chadwick ended their relationship in January 2018, they remained close friends until his death. Hinch rekindled his relationship with Australian animal rights advocate Lynda Stoner and they remained a couple until his death in 2026.

In March 2017, Hinch told The New Zealand Herald that he had been molested by a brother of one of his father's friends as a nine-year-old boy in his childhood home in New Plymouth in 1953.

Hinch identified as an atheist.

=== Health ===
In 2006, Hinch lost weight and his health declined. On 4 March 2007, he revealed on 60 Minutes he had been suffering from advanced cirrhosis of the liver, and that a tumour had been found on his liver. On 27 April 2007, Hinch returned to the hospital for additional scans. On 4 August 2007, Hinch revealed he had inoperable liver cancer.

On 20 September 2010, Hinch confirmed the liver cancer diagnosis, and said that he expected to undergo surgery to remove a third of his liver, and that this would take him off-air for several weeks. Doctors gave him a 60% chance of surviving a further five years. On 4 November 2010, Hinch told his listeners that his doctors had told him that without a liver transplant, his maximum survival would be 12 months.

On 6 July 2011, Hinch underwent liver transplant surgery at the Austin Hospital in Melbourne.

=== Death ===
Hinch died in his sleep in the morning of 10 July 2026 at his apartment on St Kilda Road in Melbourne at the age of 82. Politicians from all sides and many journalists paid tribute to Hinch. Prime Minister Anthony Albanese praised his "sense of the deeper story and the courage to cover it, come what may." The federal leader of the opposition, Angus Taylor, said Hinch was a man who "stood by his opinions with conviction and was never afraid to court controversy". Ray Martin, who introduced Hinch into the Media Hall of Fame in 2018, said, "For six decades, Derryn Hinch has been a colourful, megaphone-campaigning, groundbreaking journalist. ... a legend of Australian journalism".

== Published works ==
In May 2026 Stephen Gibbs from the Daily Mail discovered a 102-page novel by Hinch, Felicity, based on the 1979 Australian R-rated erotic film of that name, to which Hinch had added some more explicit chapters. The book was published under the pen name Jean Le Monde and published by Circus Books, a division of Milgrom + Schwartz which was then co-owned by Morry Schwartz. Hinch told Gibbs that he regretted writing that material.

- The Scrabble Book (1972, rev. ed. 1977), ISBN 0-333-23073-6
- Death at Newport (1986), ISBN 0-207-15422-8
- AIDS – Most of the Questions, Some of the Answers (1987), ISBN 0-9587779-1-8
- Death in Paradise (1989), ISBN 0-207-16165-8
- The Derryn Hinch Diet (1991), ISBN 0-14-016527-4
- That's Life (1992), ISBN 0-14-016986-5
- The Ultimate Guide to Winning Scrabble (2001), ISBN 1-86325-324-6
- 101 Ways To Lose Your Mobile Phone (2001), ISBN 0-646-40631-0
- The Fall and Rise of Derryn Hinch: How I Hit the Wall and Didn't Bleed (2004), ISBN 1-74066-159-1
- You are So Beautiful – The Passion and the Pain of Relationships (2006), ISBN 0-646-46322-5
- I Beat the Booze and You Can Too (2009) ISBN 978-0-9805726-0-5
- Human Headlines: My 50 Years in the Media (2010) ISBN 978-0-9805726-1-2
- A Human Deadline – A Story of Life, Death, Hope and House Arrest (2012) ISBN 9780980572629
- Hinch vs Canberra: Behind the Human Headlines (2017) ISBN 978-0-522-87317-7
- Unfinished Business: Life of a Senator (2020) ISBN 978-0-522-87353-5
