= Somebody Like You (Jimmy Christo song) =

1994 single by Audio Murphy Inc.

Single by Jimmy Christo

from the album The Wog Boy
- Released: May 2000
- Length: 3:55
- Label: Mushroom Records
- Songwriter(s): Jimmy Christo, Aaron Hendra
- Producer(s): Ant Dale, Vince Deltito

Jimmy Christo singles chronology
"Somebody Like You" (2000)	"Rainbow Eyes" (2000)

"Somebody Like You" is a song recorded by Australian singer Jimmy Christo. It was released in May 2000 as Christo's debut single and peaked at number 50 on the ARIA charts. The song appeared on The Wog Boy soundtrack.

== Track listings ==
Australian CD single (Mushroom – MUSH019452)

1. "Somebody Like You" (Single Radio Mix) - 3:55
2. "Somebody Like You" (Andy Boy Remix) (Radio Edit) - 3:24
3. "Somebody Like You" (Groove Peddlers) (Radio Edit) - 2:54
4. "Somebody Like You" (Andy Boy Remix) (Extended Mix) - 5:11
5. "Somebody Like You" (Groove Peddlers Club Mix) - 4:43
6. "Somebody Like You" (Mega Mix) - 5:23
7. "Somebody Like You" (Lost Vox Mix) - 5:32

== Charts ==
Chart (2000)	Peak position
Australia (ARIA)	50
