= The Wannabes =

- Film poster
- Directed by: Nick Giannopoulos
- Written by: Nick Giannopoulos; Chris Anastassides; Ray Boseley
- Produced by: Nick Giannopoulos; Tom Burstall
- Starring: Nick Giannopoulos; Russell Dykstra; Isla Fisher; Ryan Johnson; Michael Carman; Lena Cruz; Tony Nikolakopoulos; Costas Kilias; Chantal Contouri; Felix Williamson; Bert Newton; Rove McManus
- Music by: David Hirschfelder
- Production company: Macquarie Film Corporation
- Distributed by: Hoyts
- Release date: 2003
- Running time: 92 minutes
- Country: Australia
- Language: English
- Box office: $1,227,588

The Wannabes, titled Criminal Ways in the United States, is a 2003 Australian comedy film starring Nick Giannopoulos, Russell Dykstra, Isla Fisher, Ryan Johnson, Michael Carman, Lena Cruz, Tony Nikolakopoulos, Costas Kilias, Chantal Contouri and Felix Williamson. Rove McManus also appears in the film as himself, promoting The Wannabes on his TV show Rove Live.

== Cast ==
- Nick Giannopoulos as Danny
- Russell Dykstra as Marcus
- Isla Fisher as Kirsty
- Ryan Johnson as Hammer
- Michael Carman as Jimmy King
- Lena Cruz as Aurora van Dyke
- Tony Nikolakopoulos
- Costas Kilias as Adrian
- Chantal Contouri as Sally
- Felix Williamson
- Bert Newton as Himself
- Rove McManus as Himself
- Terry Gill as Barney the Bear

== Plot ==
Danny (Nick Giannopoulos) is a talentless, yet clumsy, and therefore awkward entertainer who is hired by Marcus (Russell Dykstra) and his motley crew to turn them into the biggest kids' group since the Wiggles, the Hooley Dooleys, Hi-5, Bananas in Pyjamas, Play School, and Barney the Bear (a knock-off of Humphrey B. Bear). But while Danny is training them to become The Wannabes, they're secretly planning to use their new identity as cover to pull off a heist of a diamond necklace from the very rich Aurora Van Dyke (Lena Cruz). Aurora has hosted a party for her grandchild, and booked all the best child entertainers in town to perform, and as The Wannabes prepare for the show, two of the characters steal the necklace.

The burglary doesn't go as planned, so they ditch the necklace and escape the scene without being caught. But after the escapade something totally unexpected happens; they end up becoming the hottest kids' band in the country. They even have The Wannabes merchandise and posters, etc.; they release an album and even do a performance on the Australian show Rove Live. Their fame continues to build until Aurora Van Dyke discovers they were the people responsible for trying to steal her necklace. After some escapades including abduction and rescuing, The Wannabes discover crime doesn't pay, but kids' bands do.

== Reception ==
Australian critics have generally given the film a negative reception.

Luke Buckmaster of In Film Australia wrote "This agitating juvenile comedy slides on a downwards trajectory into the wastelands of bad comedy and poor screen writing. (Writer and director Nick Giannopoulos) never decides who The Wannabes is intended for -- is it a movie for grown ups? Is it a movie for kids? The film's tonal indecision subsequently renders it inappropriate for any specific demographic."

Movie critic and editor of Film Inc magazine, Erin Free described The Wannabes as "More or less a comic abomination. That's a complete failure, that film."

Australian DVD review website Michael D's Region 4 DVD Info Page noted that it is "dripping with countless and obvious faults in both its concept and execution. For example, the script is so poorly written and constructed, that I am astounded that it was ever green-lit for filming in that condition."

MaryAnn Johanson from the Flick Filosopher described the film as "a terrifying attempt at a children's movie... or a horrible attempt at satire. It's hard to tell which -- either way, you should run in the other direction as fast as you can and never look back. Maybe it's a cultural thing, but this is one of the worst films I've ever seen." But there have been some good reviews. People magazine told us it was a weird hilarious movie. OK magazine said Nick Giannopoulos gave it a great go and succeeded.

== Box office ==
The Wannabes grossed $1,227,588 at the box office in Australia.

== See also ==
- Cinema of Australia
