= Cosima Coppola =

Italian dancer and actress

- Born: October 17, 1983 (age 42); Taranto, Apulia, Italy
- Occupations: Actress and dancer

Cosima Coppola (born October 17, 1983) is an Italian dancer and actress of cinema, theatre and television.

== Career ==
Cosima Coppola was born in Taranto, Apulia, but she grew in Fragagnano. When she was 19 years old, she moved to Rome to work as a dancer.

In 2003, she started to study recitation. Her television debut was on the soap opera Un Posto al Sole. After, she has had roles in several television mini-series, like Carabinieri 4 (2005), Il sangue e la rosa (2008), Il falco e la colomba (2009), Viso d'angelo (2011), Rodolfo Valentino – La leggenda (2014), Furore – Il vento della speranza (2014) and L'onore e il rispetto (2006–2012), where she played the part of Melina Bastianelli in Fortebracci.

She also appeared in the Australian film Wog Boy 2: Kings of Mykonos (2010) in the role of Enza.

== Filmography ==
=== Theatre ===
- Odio il rosso (2007)

=== Film ===
- Wog Boy 2: Kings of Mykonos (2010)

=== Television ===
- Un Posto al Sole
- Empire (2005)
- Carabinieri 4 (2005)
- L'onore e il rispetto (2006–2012)
- Donne sbagliate (2007)
- Io ti assolvo (2008)
- Il sangue e la rosa (2008)
- Il falco e la colomba (2009)
- Viso d'angelo (2011)
- Rodolfo Valentino – La leggenda (2014)
- Furore – Il vento della speranza (2014)
