= Lena Cruz =

New Zealand actress

- Born: Lena Cruz; Philippines
- Occupation: Television actor

Lena Cruz is a New Zealand actress who is known for her role as Sofia Martinez in long-running soap Shortland Street.

== Filmography ==
=== Film ===
Film	Year	Role	Notes
The Wannabes	2003	Aurora 'Rory' Van Dyke	
The Night We Called It a Day	2003	Margarita	
The Great Raid	2005	Mother of Pregnant Girl (Platero)	
Here Out West	2021	Bebot	

=== Television ===
Series	Year	Role	Notes	Ref.
Shortland Street	1999–2001	Sofia Martinez		
Small Claims	2004		TV movie	
Dirt Game	2009	Ms Lim		
All Saints	2009	Mary	1 episode: Safe Haven	
Bargain Coast	2009	Pet		
The Very Trevor Ashley Show	2012	Carmen	Pilot	
Kiki and Kitty	2017	Brenda	1 episode	
Deadly Women	2017	Work Colleague	Series 11; 1 episode	
The Letdown	2019	Jennifer	1 episode: The Dilemma	
The Unusual Suspects	2021	Amy	Main cast	
Bump	2021	Vet	1 episode	
Wellmania	2023	Mary	3 episodes	
Love Me	2023	Cora	2 episodes (season 2)	
In Limbo	2023	Maria	6 episodes	
Erotic Stories	2023	Vivian	1 episode	
Heartbreak High	2024	Linda	1 episode	
