= 97 Minutes =

2023 action thriller film

- Theatrical release poster
- Directed by: Timo Vuorensola
- Screenplay by: Pavan Grover
- Produced by: Pavan Grover; Jamie R. Thompson; Jake Seal
- Starring: Alec Baldwin; Jonathan Rhys Meyers; MyAnna Buring; Pavan Grover; Anjul Nigam
- Cinematography: Konstantin Freyer
- Edited by: Eric Potter
- Music by: Ian Livingstone
- Production companies: Lighthouse Pictures; A Pavan Grover Production; Black Hangar Productions; Orwo Studios
- Distributed by: Vertical Entertainment (United States); 101 Films (United Kingdom)
- Release date: June 9, 2023
- Running time: 93 minutes
- Countries: United Kingdom; United States
- Language: English

97 Minutes is a 2023 British-American action thriller film starring Alec Baldwin, Jonathan Rhys Meyers and MyAnna Buring, directed by Timo Vuorensola, written by Pavan Grover, and produced by Jake Seal, Pavan Grover, and Jamie R. Thompson.

== Synopsis ==
A hijacked Boeing 767 has 97 minutes of fuel remaining. The NSA, under the direction of Hawkins, intends to intercept the plane to avoid further trouble. However, Toyin intervenes because the NSA has an informant among the terrorists. Nevertheless, she cannot stop Hawkins from allowing an F-22 to shoot at the plane.

On the plane, Alex pretends to be the NSA informant. He steers the plane to the left, causing the missile to miss the plane but hit another one by mistake. Anan, one of the terrorists, activates a nuclear bomb on the plane that will explode on impact. Consequently, intercepting the plane is no longer an option.

It is revealed that an other terrorist named Marko, not Alex, is the NSA informant. Alex, who’s real name is Enid, wants revenge for his son, who was killed by an NSA operation. He now steers the plane toward the NSA headquarters.

Kim, a physician, knocks out Alex and can land the plane safely. Alex changes his mind, helps her to land the plane and dies.

== Cast ==
- Alec Baldwin as NSA Director Hawkins
- Jonathan Rhys Meyers as Alex
- MyAnna Buring as Kim
- Jo Martin as Toyin
- Pavan Grover as Anan
- Valery Danko as Baby's Mother
- Michael Sirow as Asghar
- Anjul Nigam as Hitar
- Davor Tomic as Marko
- Slavko Sobin as Orca
- Luke J I Smith as Goran
- Kasia Koleczek as Leika
- Austin Parsons as Red
- Chris Wilson as Passenger
- Peter Brooke as Stuart

== Production ==
Baldwin was filming in Alton, Hampshire on 9 February 2022. Baldwin posted videos on his social media accounts to say "it was strange working again" after the death of cinematographer Halyna Hutchins on his previous film set Rust. On 16 February 2022 Jonathan Rhys Meyers and MyAnna Buring were announced as having joined the cast on the production at Black Hangar Studios, along with actors Jo Martin, Michael Sirow, Anjul Nigam, Davor Tomic, Slavko Sobin, Luke J I Smith and Kasia Koleczek. Jamie R Thompson from Lighthouse Pictures and Jake Seal from Orwo Studios produced with Pavan Grover. Michael Arata, Jerry Daigle, Suraj Gohill, Avi Haas and Ford Corbett were executive producers. Funding with Orwo are Origo Financial Services, with Orwo Film Distribution doing the international sales. 97 Minutes is produced by Pavan Grover, Jamie Thompson, and Jake Seal. Working from a script by Pavan Grover, director Timo Vuorensola and cinematographer Konstantin Freyer wrapped filming after only 18 days on two film sets. Grover said Baldwin had been attached for 18 months prior to the filming and the part had been tailored for him. Previously, William Hurt had been attached to the film. Grover had written the script whilst working as an interventional spine specialist and minimally invasive surgeon in Houston, Texas in 2009.

== Release ==
Writer and co-producer Pavan Grover reported 97 Minutes was due for a limited theater release on June 9, 2023. 97 Minutes became available on Hulu in September 2023 and later on Amazon's Prime Video.
