= Tales from Outer Suburbia =

Animated Australian children's series

- Genre: Fantasy; Family
- Based on: Tales from Outer Suburbia by Shaun Tan
- Written by: Sam Carroll; Lally Katz
- Directed by: Noel Cleary
- Creative director: Shaun Tan
- Starring: Brooklyn Davies; Geraldine Hakewill; Felix Oliver Vergés; Tony Nikolakopoulos; Andrea Solonge; Dawn French
- Composers: Ned Beckley; Josh Hogan
- Country of origin: Australia
- Original language: English
- No. of seasons: 1
- No. of episodes: 10

Production
- Executive producers: Barbara Stephen; Andra Johnson Duke; Bernadette O'Mahony; Francesca Hope; Jeff Simpson; Julia Adams; Karen Vermeulen; Libbie Doherty
- Producers: Sophie Byrne; Alexia Gates-Foale
- Running time: 22 minutes
- Production companies: Screen Australia; Australian Broadcasting Corporation; Australian Children's Television Foundation; BYUtv; Screenwest; Lotterywest; Siamese; Highly Spirited; Flying Bark Productions

Original release
- Network: ABC iView
- Release: 1 January 2026 – present

Tales from Outer Suburbia is an animated Australian children's series for the Australian Broadcasting Corporation (ABC) and BYUtv, released on 1 January 2026. It was produced by Flying Bark Productions and Highly Spirited. Based on Shaun Tan's book of the same name, it focuses on Klara and her brother Pim as they move into a new neighbourhood, finding that the street is more than meets the eye.

At the 2026 Screen Music Awards, music by Ned Beckley and Josh Hogan was nominated for Best Opening Title - Television theme, Best Soundtrack and "Nothing Stays the Same" for Best Original Song Composed for the Screen.

== Plot ==
Klara and her brother Pim move into a new neighbourhood with their mother Lucy. As Klara and Pim find their new street hiding more than meets the eye, they navigate new adventures and their new lives.

== Cast ==
On 10 June 2025, the voice cast for the series was announced.

- Brooklyn Davies as Klara
- Felix Oliver Vergés as Pim
- Geraldine Hakewill as Lucy
- Andrea Solonge as Cat
- Shabana Azeez as Esme
- Tony Nikolakopoulos as Grandpa
- Dawn French as Grandma
- Michael Theo as Lorenzo

== Production ==
On 1 August 2022, it was announced by the Australian Children's Television Foundation that the series was in development.

On 14 November 2023, ABC announced the series alongside a third season of Kangaroo Beach. Tales from Outer Suburbia would be produced by Flying Bark Productions, with Shaun Tan overseeing the series as a creative director. Production for the series took place in Western Australia.

On 20 November 2025, at the ABC Upfronts event, ABC announced the series would air in 2026. On 1 January 2026, the series aired on ABC and ABC iView. The U.S. debut for the series was on 7 January 2026 on BYUtv.
