= Anjul Nigam =

Indian-American actor

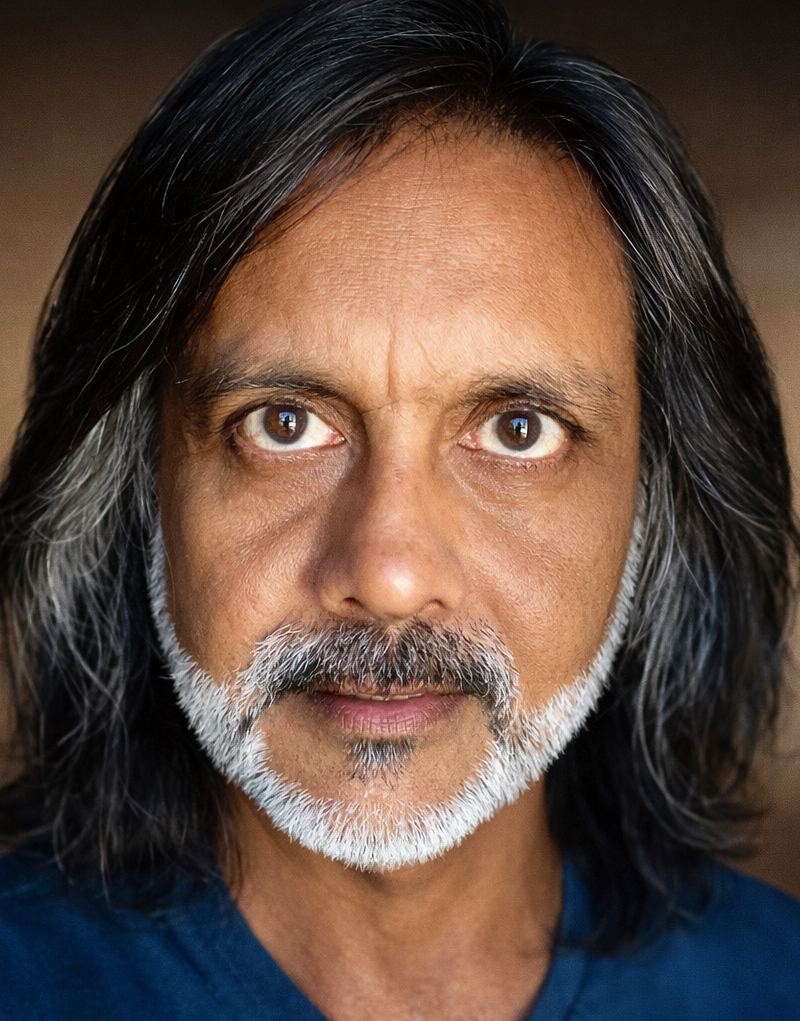
- Born: 15 December 1965 (age 60); Kanpur, India
- Education: New York University

Anjul Nigam (born 15 December 1965) is an Indian-born American actor, producer, and writer.

== Early life and education ==
Nigam was born in Kanpur, India. He is a graduate of Cheshire High School in Cheshire, Connecticut and the New York University Tisch School of the Arts.

== Career ==
He is known for his recurring role as "Dr. Raj, the Psychiatric Doctor" on the ABC medical drama Grey's Anatomy, as a producer/writer/actor in the film Growing Up Smith and a producer of the films "Crown Vic", and Louisiana Caviar in Cuba Gooding Jr.'s directorial debut in which Gooding stars with Richard Dreyfuss. He appeared as one of the supporting leads in the CBS/Hallmark Hall of Fame movie Back When We Were Grownups along with Faye Dunaway, Peter Fonda, Jack Palance and Blythe Danner and directed by Ron Underwood. Nigam was one of four leads in 20th Century Fox's The First $20 Million Is Always the Hardest for director Mick Jackson and producers Harold Ramis and Trevor Albert. Nigam co-starred with Bill Murray and James Spader in the Universal/StudioCanal feature comedy Speaking of Sex for director John McNaughton.

As for television, Nigam played the role of "Pandit Raj" in the Netflix series Never Have I Ever, recurred as the "Medical Examiner" in Season Two of True Detective, a regular in the role of "Nurse Manoj Nakshi" on the ABC medical drama MDs, and one of the leads in the ABC miniseries Tom Clancy's Netforce and in Showtime's Silver Strand. Nigam has had over fifty guest starring roles in primetime television shows including So Help Me Todd, Animal Kingdom, Shark, Medium, Numb3rs, CSI: NY, CSI: Crime Scene Investigation, Huff, ER and NYPD Blue.

In theater, Nigam has appeared alongside fellow-NYU alumni Philip Seymour Hoffman in the controversial production of the Peter Sellars directed The Merchant of Venice at the Royal Shakespeare Company in London and The Goodman Theatre in Chicago.

In 2021, Nigam was named as a producer on Rust, which halted production due a firearms incident resulting in the death of a cinematographer Halyna Hutchins.

== Filmography ==
=== Film ===
| Year | Title | Role | Notes |
|---|---|---|---|
| 1991 | House Party 2 | Singh | |
| 1999 | Two Rivers | Karna | |
| 2000 | King of the Korner | Tow Truck Driver | |
| 2001 | The Sizemore Interviews | Arun Ram | Direct-to-video |
| 2001 | Speaking of Sex | Jarred | |
| 2002 | The First $20 Million Is Always the Hardest | Salman Fard | |
| 2003 | Winter Break | Rajeev | Uncredited |
| 2005 | Looking for Comedy in the Muslim World | Boyfriend | Uncredited |
| 2007 | Death and Taxis | Todd | |
| 2008 | Cloverfield | Bodega Cashier | |
| 2009 | Terminator Salvation | Rahul | |
| 2011 | Answers to Nothing | Doctor | |
| 2013 | Bad Words | Sriram Chopra | |
| 2015 | Growing Up Smith | Bhaaskar Bhatnagar | Producer, writer |
| 2017 | Trafficked | General Singh | |
| 2018 | Bayou Caviar | | Producer |
| 2019 | Crown Vic | | Producer |
| 2022 | Murder at Yellowstone City | | Producer |
| 2023 | Supercell | Ramesh | Executive Producer |
| 2023 | 97 Minutes | Hitar | Executive Producer |
| 2024 | Crescent City | Gopal Sharma | Executive Producer |
| 2024 | Rust | | Producer |
| TBA | Red Card | | Producer |

=== Television ===
| Year | Title | Role | Notes |
|---|---|---|---|
| 1989, 1990 | Growing Pains | Sub #2 / Raj | 2 episodes |
| 1991 | Parker Lewis Can't Lose | Anjul | Episode: "Tower of Power" |
| 1992 | Blossom | Sanji | Episode: "The Making of the President" |
| 1993 | Murphy Brown | Sanjay Khandwhalla | Episode: "The Young & the Rest of Us" |
| 1995 | Silver Strand | Rahman | Television film |
| 1996 | Sisters | Driver | Episode: "Don't Go to Springfield" |
| 1996 | High Incident | Messenger | Episode: "Christmas Blues" |
| 1997 | ER | Alex Ghandar | Episode: "Fortune's Fools" |
| 1997 | Extreme Ghostbusters | Sajid | Episode: "Seeds of Destruction" |
| 1997 | NYPD Blue | Kumar | Episode: "The Truth Is Out There" |
| 1998 | The Lake | Dr. Sanjay | Television film |
| 1998 | Mowgli: The New Adventures of the Jungle Book | Namas | Episode: "The Perfect Shot" |
| 1998 | Nash Bridges | Vijay | Episode: "Danger Zone" |
| 1999 | NetForce | Uday Shankar | Television film |
| 1999 | Get Real | Mall Worker | Episode: "Denial" |
| 2001 | The Wild Thornberrys | Pakistani Man / Vendor | Episode: "Gem of a Mom" |
| 2001 | Arliss | TV Commercial Director | Episode: "Setting Precedents" |
| 2001 | Providence | Raji | Episode: "Gobble, Gobble" |
| 2002 | CSI: Crime Scene Investigation | Rajeeb Khandewahl | Episode: "Blood Lust" |
| 2002 | MDs | Nurse Manoj Nakshi | 8 episodes |
| 2004 | Days of Our Lives | Professor Sandeev Bhalla | Episode #1.9883 |
| 2004 | Huff | Dr. Alhabah | Episode: "Lipstick on Your Panties" |
| 2004 | Back When We Were Grownups | Hakim | Television film |
| 2005 | CSI: NY | Harish Lev | Episode: "Tanglewood" |
| 2005 | Numbers | Dr. Renfro | Episode: "Vector" |
| 2005 | Medium | Doctor | Episode: "Light Sleeper" |
| 2005–2017 | Grey's Anatomy | Dr. Raj Sen | 8 episodes |
| 2006 | Shark | Alex Neuville | Episode: "Dr. Feelbad" |
| 2008 | Murder 101 | Devi Kanesh | Episode: "New Age" |
| 2008 | Supernatural | Stewie Meyers | Episode: "Long Distance Call" |
| 2008 | Crash | Dr. Rav | Episode: "Episode One" |
| 2009 | Lie to Me | Shreyas Patel | Episode: "Depraved Heart" |
| 2009 | Ghost Whisperer | Dr. Prakash | Episode: "Devil's Bargain" |
| 2010 | Childrens Hospital | Sultan's Aide | Episode: "The Sultan's Finger: Live" |
| 2013 | Revenge | Zahir Lahari | Episode: "Victory" |
| 2015 | Battle Creek | Aadi Patel | Episode: "Old Wounds" |
| 2015 | True Detective | Ventura County Medical Examiner | 2 episodes |
| 2018 | American Woman | Milo | Episode: "The Party" |
| 2020 | Never Have I Ever | Pandit Raj | Episode: "...felt super Indian" |
| 2020 | A Christmas Call | Ahmed | Television film |
| 2021 | Animal Kingdom | Gopal | Episode: "Relentless" |
| 2023 | So Help Me Todd | Norman Smith | Episode: "Side Effects May Include Murder" |
