= Frank Lotito =

Australian actor

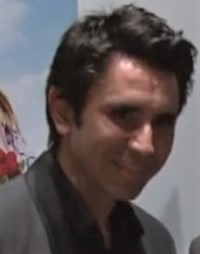
- Frank Lotito at 2011 Perth Premiere of Big Mammas Boy
- Born: Melbourne, Victoria, Australia
- Citizenship: Australian
- Occupations: Actor, Comedian, Film director, Film producer
- Years active: 2001–present
- Spouse: Katia Lotito

Frank Lotito is an Australian actor, comedian, film director and film producer. He currently resides in Melbourne, Australia with his wife and children.

== Early life ==
Lotito played "Carmelo" in the long running stage show The Wedding, produced by Broccoli productions. It was during his six years with the company traveling around Australia that he discovered his love for stand-up comedy.

== Career ==
Lotito has performed as a stand-up comedian, television compare and actor. His television credits include guest roles in Australian shows Neighbours, Blue Healers, Stingers, The Secret Life of Us and Thank God You're Here. In 2003 Lotito was a TV presenter on the local travel program Discover for Network 7.

In 2007 he worked closely with Ian Thorpe producing a two-hour documentary on the environment, titled Fish out of water. Since then Lotito has gone on to produce The Phone hosted by Justin Melvey for Fox8. Stefano's Cooking Paradiso, An eight-part cooking series for Lifestyle Food, which was nominated for a TV Logie award and Vancouver Dreams a two-hour special on the 2010 Winter Games.

Lotito has also produced feature films, including Big Mamma's Boy, which he wrote and starred in, The Lookalike starring Justin Long and Jerry O'Connell, and Growing Up Smith, starring Jason Lee, which is also Lotito's directorial debut.

== Filmography ==
- Big Mamma's Boy (2011, writer, producer, actor)
- The Lookalike (2014, producer, actor)
- Growing Up Smith (2015, director, producer)
- Wog Boys Forever (2022, director)
- Pellegrini's: A Melbourne Legacy (2025)
