= L'onore e il rispetto =

Italian soap opera

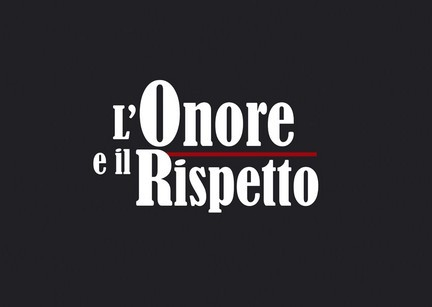
- Italian logo
- Genre: Crime drama; Soap opera
- Created by: Salvatore Samperi, Luigi Parisi & Alessio Inturri
- Starring: Cosima Coppola; Gabriel Garko; Serena Autieri; Eric Roberts; Paul Sorvino; Laura Torrisi; Giuliana De Sio; Alessandra Martines
- Opening theme: Mafia
- Country of origin: Italy
- Original language: Italian
- No. of seasons: 5
- No. of episodes: 32

Production
- Running time: 100 min (Italian version); 45 min (North American version)
- Production companies: Janus International; Mediaset; Taodue Film

Original release
- Network: Canale 5
- Release: 5 September 2006 – 19 May 2017

L'onore e il Rispetto is an Italian crime-drama and Soap opera broadcast on Canale 5. It is composed of four seasons of six episodes each: the first aired in 2006, the second in 2009 and the third in 2012. The fourth season, initially scheduled for the first months of the year, was broadcast from 1 September 2015. Even before the airing of the said season, Mediaset renewed the series for a fifth season.

The first season was directed by Salvatore Samperi, the second by the same Samperi (who died before the broadcast) and Luigi Parisi, the third and fourth season by the latter and Alessio Inturri. The series is the stepping stone into the world of fiction for the successful couple Manuela Arcuri and Gabriel Garko and has hosted several renowned actors, including: Virna Lisi, Giancarlo Giannini, Paul Sorvino, Ángela Molina, Vincent Spano, Eric Roberts, Giuliana De Sio, Ben Gazzara, Ray Lovelock, Alessandra Martines, Lina Sastri, Burt Young, Barbara De Rossi, and Bo Derek.

As of 2025, reruns are currently shown on La5 as is available on Mediaset Infinity. In the United States, the series was made available on Amazon Prime Video as Honor and Respect - The Series. The North American rights for the series are also currently held by FilmRise.

== Plot ==
=== First season ===
Mascalucia, Sicily, 1956: Ersilia Fortebracci is a dreamer and progressive woman, who dreams of a different life away from Sicily where she lives. When her father in law dies, she convinces her husband Pasquale to sell the estate of the deceased patriarch Rocco, and leave Sicily to start a new life in the north with his two sons Tonio and Santi, with the hope of making a fortune.

In Turin, Ersilia and her family are welcomed by her cousin Nino Vitale, who will introduce to a man, whose name is Pippo 'o Calabrese: this man will help them to invest their savings in an appliance store. But behind this help hide intrigue and trouble, and for the family Fortebracci there is no peace. Pasquale will not be able to defend against the local underworld, who will exploit and push him to suicide in 1965, while Ersilia, unable to bear the pain of her husband's death, loses her mind, ending up in a nursing home. Tonio and Santi, the Ersilia and deceased Pasquale's sons, will become the two protagonists of this history and will make their way, in their own way, to achieve their goals.

Tonio is a smart and impetuous guy, and an unrepentant womanizer, but in an attempt to unmask the traitors of his family and to take revenge, his life takes a turn for the worse, that will take him to the top of the Cosa Nostra's underworld (when the most important figures are don Rosario and don Calogero). Santi instead is the opposite of his brother: he's a shy and introverted boy. He will take the opposite route, the rule of law, becoming magistrate to combat crime through justice and not through vengeance. Tonio, to avenge his father, "killed" by Pippo 'o Calabrese, impregnates his daughter Melina, really in love with Tonio, who will leave her. Only Nella will help her, hosting her and child, to which was given the same name as his father: Antonia (therefore called Tonia). After Pippo will killed by Tonio, while Santi can become a magistrate and falls in love with Melina, promising to do a father to his niece, because Nella is dead, killed by one of the Tonio's two best friends, at the gate that separated the child up for adoption years ago, born of the rape of her stepfather who, in response, had injured his hand, but she had to be (wrongly) imprisoned by the unexpected testimony of the mother, afraid of a possible backlash from her husband; she had also fallen in love with a woman thief, but then gave up running away with the money earned through the robberies.

Meanwhile, Tonio falls in love with Olga, a very beautiful and wealthy, and does everything just to be able to win her heart. So he decided to make his wife Olga, beginning to be part of the clan of Don Calogero Rocca. After many vicissitudes, Tonio and Olga marry; but Olga will be the victim of Tonio, which will close in a room in his new house after discovering a woman's attempt to escape. She's unhappy with Tonio, but she is pregnant also: Tonio is excited to have a son who served, but the wife manages to escape and makes you think the player to have an abortion, the latter causing a strong emotional breakdown. Meanwhile, Don Calogero, determined to kill Santi Fortebracci, one of the few incorruptible magistrates in Sicily, is to kidnap the daughter of Tony; so orders at the same Tonio to lead by him his brother to kill him.

At the beginning Tonio accepts, but at the decisive moment the protagonist plunges into a desperate battle against all, and manages to kill all the mobsters that appear in front, don Calogero included, but is seriously injured. So Santi comes immediately to his aid and kills the last two gangsters still alive; but Tonio seems that there is nothing more to do. The season ends with Santi who believe Tonio dead, so he takes his daughter Antonia safe and sound at home. Meanwhile, Olga, hearing the news of the death of Tonio, almost feels relieved: she is happy, rich, and still waiting for a child, which in Tonio had kept hidden.

=== Second season ===
Against the background of Sirenuse, Italy, of 1969, the exciting and dramatic saga of Fortebracci family continues with Tonio having survived the massacre of the quarry and now tries in every way to embrace his wife Olga. The fates, however, still adverse, will fall on him making revenge his only reason to live. In fact, the woman died in a car accident with her new boyfriend, who wanted to leave for the sake of Tonio: Only Nicolas, their only son, is saved from the tragedy. Convinced by Santi, who is still disappointed by Tonio for deceiving him (in fact, instead of going to process, he had gone to Switzerland with Olga). Tonio accepts jail, but life in prison for someone like him is impossible, especially if all the powerful bosses Sicilian want him dead. The Rocca family, who is the dead don Calogero's family, wants revenge on Tonio, so the family's matriarch, Rosangela Rocca, understanding that his son Dariois is drug dependent and can no longer take the reins of the clan, allies himself with Fred Di Venanzio.

She knows Fred, Dario's biological father, and Rodolfo's uncle, a cruel man, just returned in Sirenuse from Lebanon (where he has been for seven years), who rapes a long time the sweet sister Carmela and is admired by teenage brother Fortunato. The journalist Alma Vincy is interested in the case of "different brothers", when Santi is a magistrate and Tonio is a mafia, but at the end she works with the same Santi, who will be killed together with her and Nicolas, Tonio's son, by Fortunjato Di Venanzio and a stooge. Between Carmela and Tonio there begins to be affection, because she hides in her house to escape the violent brother, who will fall in love with Assunta Rocca, who is disagrees never with her mother, tha hate Rodolfo. After she will be strangled by Rodolfo, that wanted to use Dario to blackmail Rosangela Rocca, but the same Dario will die of overdose. The Di Venanzio's victim will be the same Rosangela, in a pitiful murder-suicide by herself wanted to be able to hug his family.

Fred, ill for some time, will also die, he has designated Tonio as the mafia's new head. Melina will do anything to keep Tonio away, but he finds himself the desire to be a father with Tonia, and save Melina when she is raped by her cousin, killing him. Meanwhile, Carmela, after the death of Rodolfo, believing that Tonio (who falls in love with the judge Francesca De Santis) is responsible and not being able to forgive, decides to leave. Tonio later discovers that it was Fortunato Di Venanzio who killed his brother and his son Nicolas, but when he asks him the truth, the same Fortunato shoots him. The second season ends with the judge Francesca De Santis who goes to the Di Venanzio's home, where he discovers that Tonio was shot.

=== Third season ===
Sirenuse, Sicily, 1969. After being fired from Fortunato Di Venanzio, Tonio has spent more than a month in a coma. Now he is awake, but he is tired of living the Mafia wars and his only desire now is to be with his family, whom he loves. In fact, he is marrying Melina, whom he loves, and he wants so much to Salvatore, his nephew, and Antonia, his daughter with Melina ten years earlier. So he decides to cooperate with the justice, represented by the judge Francesca De Santis, target of gangs and best friend of Tonio, with whom she has fallen in love. So he reveals to Francesca that many families are part of the Mafia's Dome: at the top there are the Mancuso, whose patriarch is don Tano, and to follow there are the Patrono, The Veneziano, The Romeo and what remains of the Di Venanzio (in fact now there is only Fortunato Di Venanzio, while Carmela lives in a convent, and is about to leave for New York, where an aunt is waiting her). A new character, however, will creep into everyone's life.

She is Concetta De Nicola, called Tripolina, an ex-prostitute who works for Mancuso. She has five sons, all from different men. The first is Ettore, who is in prison, the second is Giasone, the third is Paride, the wisest and as good as gold (would take a life away from the blood spilled by the Sicilian), the fourth is Venere, who is twelve years old and the Tripolina's favorite because her mother makes her live in a boarding school, away from crime, and the last Patroclo, eight years old, who, however, will be given almost immediately into the custody of another family. When Fortunato Di Venanzio, together with all chieftains' sons, rapes and kills Venere, for Tripolina that's the beginning of a great suffering and desire for revenge. So, also for Tonio who sees his family dead in front of his eyes. He doesn't know that sons of Tripolina had planted a bomb in the car of Melina on behalf of Don Tano Mancuso.

Melina and her son Salvatore dead, while Antonia, who had been with Tonio, saves herself. So Tonio, with the help of the judge De Santis, La donna e suo figlio Salvatore muoiono, invece Antonia, che era rimasta con il Fortebracci, si salva. Lui, con l'aiuto della fedele De Santis, puts her in a college, ready to make justice to himself. Ricky, his best friend, will help him and protect Antonia. Meanwhile, Tonio finds, thanks to Francesca, that behind the death of Nicolas, his sons, and Santi, his brother, one year ago, there're not only Rodolfo and Fortunato Di Venanzio, but an old boss also, Saro Ferlito, called "The puppeteer" (in the Sicilian language, ""Lu burattinaru""). Now Tonio wants kill him, and to do it, pretends to be his friend and enters in the interport of drug, from America to Sirenuse. Meanwhile, Carmela found turns out to bear a child by Tonio, in which he finds himself, and spends a night of love. But he disappears when Fortunato is killed with a throat accepted. So Carmela believes that Tonio is your brother's murderer, e and promises revenge. Indeed, Tripolina killed him, and now she wants kill all the godfathers' sons, because they raped and killed her daughter Venere. Tonio went to New York on behalf of Saro Ferlito, where he met Billy Ferlito, nephew of the boss, and the ruthless Tom Di Maggio, who is very suspicious and who immediately puts him to the test: in fact, Jennifer, a stripper, girlfriend of Billy Ferlito, but lover of Lee Di Maggio, Tom's son, does believe Tonio to be an FBI agent who is trying to frame Ferlito and Di Maggio, but Tonio in the new meeting with the two gangsters does not hesitate to reveal the identity of the girl, giving proof of his loyalty to them. Gaining confidence, Tonio thus becomes part of the American Mafia Dome and returns to Sirenuse, while Carmela is more determine than ever to get back at Tonio, and becomes the lover of Tom Di Maggio, who can not be a new friend of the same Tonio.

Returning to Sirenuse, Tonio searches for a company that is failing, to steal it and use it to bring the cocaine from Italy to America. He chooses the Liguorum company, that belongs to the baron Everaldo de Nisi, who lives with his daughter, the beautiful Fabiola. She immediately falls in love with Tonio, and his niece, the cruel and ugly Angelica. Tonio and Fabiola pass beautiful nights together, but fate will separate them forever. In fact Angelica kills her uncle Everelado and her cousin Fabiola, so now she is the sole Ligorum owner: she knows Tonio wants company, and forces him to marry her, because she fell in love with him. Meanwhile, Tripolina kills all godfathers' sons, and sides with Tonio. Together they decide to marry one of the sons of the woman, the only uncensored, Paride (who has however a girlfriend, Erminia), with Santina Mancuso, don Tano Mancuso's daughter. The plan succeeds, and after killing Fulvio, responsible for the rape of the daughter, Tripolina takes possession of the villa of Mancuso and their lives, together with his sons. From Turin comes the commissioner Renè Rolla, a strong and alternative man, who is the ex-husband of Francesca De Santis, that will die to save Tonio.

Now Tonio wants to kill Tripolina and her sons also, because he understood they're Melina and Salvatore's killers. But he must marry Angelica, whom he later will kill, electrocuting her with a hair dryer in the bath. When Giasone has to kill Erminia, Paride saves her, but he is injured. So his brother kills Erminia, but Paride, who is still alive, shoots several times at Giasone and kills him. Meanwhile, Don Tano kills his family and Tripolina, so kills himself in front of Rolla. Carmela pretends to be pregnant with Tom and after the baby is born (who is the son of Tonio) wants to kill Tonio. So by trickery, Di Maggio asks Tonio to come to New York. Tonio comes to Tom's home and when he sees Carmela, he understands he is finished in a trap, but now it is too late. Tom puts a gun to Tonio's head and this could be the death of Tonio.

=== Fourth season ===
New York City, 1970. Tonio (Gabriel Garko) is saved from the trap set by Carmela (Laura Torrisi) thanks to Jennifer (Julia Rebel). Fortebracci, returns to Sicily, he was arrested by the Commissioner Rolla (Francesco Testi) thanks to the testimony of Paride De Nicola (Federico Maria Galante). The obsession of Rolla for Fortebracci will make him lose lucidity and will make many mistakes, but in the course of the series the love for a woman can bring him lucid. In this series will stage two new families: the Giordano family, composed of Maria Pia Jordan (Lina Sastri) and Dante Giordano (Massimo Venturiello), whose founder is willing to do anything to take the place of Fortebracci in the dome mafia, that will come to kidnap Antonia (Beatrice Galati), the daughter of Tonio; the other family are the Salices, who live in Sicily and whose founder is Fania (Barbara De Rossi), an ugly woman and illiterate. The Salices are ready to do anything to ally with Giordano and kill Tonio. Also we will meet Ettore De Nicola (Valerio Morigi), who manages to escape from prison again and will be hungry for revenge and ready to climb the hierarchy of the dome mafia, becoming even more violent, evil and cruel. Also Fortebracci tighten friendship with Michael (Stefano Dionisi), a mysterious villain, but Tonio help saving his life many times throughout the series becoming a kind of guardian angel for Tonio. Finally Carmela, still convinced that Tonio had killed his brother, in revenge tighten new alliances before in America, with the new Godfather American Lino Li Cause (Burt Young), who took the place of the late Tom di Maggio, and then look in Sicily where there will be the final showdown with Tonio ...

== Episodes ==
Season	Episodes	Prime TV
First Season	6	2006
Second Season	6	2009
Third Season	6	2012
Fourth Season	6	2015
Fifth Season	8	2017

== Cast ==
- Gabriel Garko as Tonio Fortebracci (Seasons 1-2-3-4-5)
- Cosima Coppola as Melina Bastianelli (Seasons 1-2-3 first episode)
- Giuseppe Zeno as Santi Fortebracci (Seasons 1–2 third episode)
- Manuela Arcuri as Nella (Season 1 fifth episode)
- Giancarlo Giannini as Giuseppe Bastianelli, called Pippo O' Calabrese (Season 1 third episode)
- Virna Lisi as Ersilia Fortebracci (Season 1 third episode)
- Luigi Maria Burruano as Don Rosario Liberati (Seasons 1–2 first episode)
- Antonio Giuliani as Nino Vitale (Season 1 first episode)
- Renato Marotta: as Micky (Season 1)
- Cristiano Pasca as Ricky (Seasons 1-2-3-4-5)
- Vincent Spano as Rodolfo Di Venanzio (Season 2)
- Elena Russo as Assunta Rocca (Season 2 fourth episode)
- Sergio Arcuri as Dario Rocca (Season 2 fourth episode)
- Valeria Milillo as Alma Vincy (Season 2 third episode)
- Laura Torrisi as Carmela Di Venanzio (Seasons 2-3-4)
- Ángela Molina as Donna Rosangela (Season 2 fifth episode)
- Ben Gazzara as Fred Di Venanzio (Season 2)
- Alessandra Martines as Francesca De Santis (Seasons 2–3 fourth episode)
- Gabriele Rossi as Fortunato Di Venanzio (Season 2–3-second episode)
- Giuliana De Sio as Concetta Da Nicola, called Tripolina (Season 3)
- Francesco Fiumarella as the chief of the security police (Season 3)
- Eric Roberts as Tom Di Maggio (Seasons 3–4)
- Martina Pinto as Fabiola (Season 3 fifth episode)
- Ray Lovelock as Everaldo De Nisi (Season 3 third episode)
- Francesco Testi as Renè Rolla (Seasons 3–4)
- Valerio Morigi as Ettore (Seasons 3–4)
- Giulio Forges Davanzati as Giasone (Seasons 3)
- Federico Maria Galante as Paride (Seasons 3–4)
- Lidya Giordano as Angelica (Season 3)
- Viola Velasco as Erminia (Season 3)
- Gilberto Idonea as the procurator Trapanese (Seasons 2-3-4)
- Serena Autieri as Olga (Seasons 1–2 first episode)
- Sebastiano Lo Monaco as Lawyer Vasile (Season 2 fifth episode)

== Soundtrack ==
These are the songs of Savio Riccardi used in the episodes:

=== L'onore e il Rispetto ===
- Onore E Rispetto
- Don Calogero
- Ersilia
- Il Sogno Di Olga
- Il Sogno Di Olga (Reprise)
- Melina
- Muro Contro Muro
- Nella
- Onore E Rispetto (Versione Drammatica)
- Tammorriata Criminale
- Tema Di Tonio

=== L'onore e il Rispetto Parte Seconda ===
- L'Onore e il Rispetto Parte Seconda
- Rodolfo
- La Cupola
- Hotel Roma
- Funerale
- Al Mercato
- Tonio E Carmela
- Sicilianesca
- Torbido Segreto
- Senza Via Di Scampo
- Tonio E Melina
- Rimpianti
- Fantasmi Del Passato
- L'Onore Sopra Tutto

=== L'onore e il Rispetto Parte Terza ===
- Onore e Rispetto (Extended Version)
- Elegia
- Il Burattinaio
- Nuova York
- Vento di Sirenuse
- Tripolina

=== L'onore e il Rispetto Parte Quarta ===
- Fra la vita e la morte
- Giallo e passione
- Negli occhi di andra
- Canto dell'anima nera
- Redenzione
- Arrusi
- Sospetti fondati
- Tensione oltreoceano
- Infido
- Un amore puro
- Rapimento
- Rivelazioni e vendette
- Trappole
- Tormenti

=== L'onore e il Rispetto Ultimo Capitolo ===
- L'onore e il rispetto (Ultimo capitolo)
- Passione travolgente
- Visioni
- Antonia
- Amori tristi
- Tormenti di monaca

== See also ==
- List of Italian television series
- Şeref Meselesi
