= Hinch Live =

- Hinch Live logo
- Also known as: Hinch Live
- Genre: News, Current Affairs, Commentary
- Presented by: Derryn Hinch
- Country of origin: Australia
- Original language: English
- No. of seasons: 2

Production
- Running time: 1 hour (including commercials)

Original release
- Network: Sky News Australia
- Release: 1 February 2015 – 24 March 2016; 4 July 2019 – 5 December 2019

Hinch (originally Hinch Live) is an Australian television current affairs and commentary program that was broadcast on Sky News Australia and hosted by Derryn Hinch. The program initially aired as a twice weekly program on Saturday and Sunday nights (later airing solely on Sundays), and was originally scheduled to premiere on 31 January 2015, however the launch date was moved back a day to 1 February 2015.

The format was a continuation of weeknight Sky News program Paul Murray Live, which Hinch had been both guest host and a regular contributor.

Despite announcing his intention to stand for a Senate seat as head of Derryn Hinch's Justice Party in October 2015, Hinch remained as host of Hinch Live until the election campaign, in a decision supported by Sky News.

The show's final episode aired on 24 April 2016, ahead of the impending 2016 election campaign, with Hinch telling viewers the show was entering either "semi or permanent recess" depending on Hinch's success in winning a Senate position. Hinch was successful in his campaign and was elected as a Senator for Victoria, therefore ending the program.

== Reboot (2019) ==
Following Hinch's defeat in the 2019 Australian federal election, Hinch returned to Sky News as host of weekly Thursday night program Hinch. However, low ratings suggested that the show may not return in 2020.

In November 2019, it was confirmed that the show would not return in 2020. While the last episode was expected to air on 12 December it concluded one week earlier on 5 December 2019. Hinch claimed the reason for his show's cancellation was that he "wasn't right wing enough".
