= Sooshi Mango =

Italian-Australian comedy troupe

- Notable work: Off The Boat Tour Home Made Tour

Comedy career
- Years active: 2015–present
- Medium: Internet, theatre, television, film, live touring
- Genre: comedy
- Subject: ethnic comedy
- Members: Joe Salanitri; Carlo Salanitri; Andrew Manfre
- Website: www.sooshimango.com

Sooshi Mango is an Australian comedy troupe founded in 2015. The group consists of two brothers, Joe and Carlo Salanitri, and their best friend, Andrew Manfre. Sooshi Mango is best known for their comedy skits, acts, videos, series and live shows, paying homage to their experiences growing up in an Italian family, and around Italians, Greeks, Croats, Serbs, Albanians, Bulgarians, Maltese and other ethnic cultures living in Australia.

The comedic influences of the group include Dean Martin and Jerry Lewis, the Marx Brothers, Laurel and Hardy, Benny Hill and many more. Being most strongly inspired by their European ancestry, their content is commonly rooted in humorously depicting the Italian and Greek ethnic and cultural diaspora and their role in Australian society, and its racial prejudice and social mechanisms of the modern-day world.

After building an audience through online video, the group moved into live performance, beginning with Australian theatres beginning in 2018 and moving onto full scale arena shows, extending well into 2026. In 2021 they won the AACTA Award for Favourite Australian Comedy Digital Creator. In December 2025 they announced their first major international tour, with dates across North America and Europe. In October 2026 their debut feature film received major production investment from Screen Australia.

Sooshi Mango features many characters in their skits, with characters Johnny, Vince and Sam being seen in the majority of their videos. With billions of views and counting, Sooshi Mango has been featured in four theatrical shows in multiple countries. Sooshi Mango are the only comedy group in history to sell out three shows in a row at Rod Laver Arena, in Melbourne, Victoria, Australia. Sooshi Mango have also been at the centre of advertisements for numerous companies.

In 2021, they launched their podcast, titled 'Saucy Meatballs', which has gone on to become one of the biggest and most listened to podcasts in Australia, continuing this success well into multiple seasons of the series.

Sooshi Mango won at the 2021 AACTA Comedy Awards for Favourite Digital Comedy Creator. Sooshi Mango began writing a script for their first own feature-length film in 2022.

The group began touring Australian arenas in 2022 with Off The Boat and in 2024 with Home Made, followed by a Home Made Encore run in 2025. In December 2025 they announced The Home Made World Tour, a 50-date tour of North America and Europe scheduled for April to November 2026. In October 2026, Screen Australia announced major production investment in their debut feature film.

== History ==
The troupe's name originated in 2015 from Joe Salanitri's son, who, when Joe and Carlo were trying to think of a name for their comedy group, shouted the two words whilst running through the house. Joe and Carlo decided to adopt the name due to its silliness. At this time, Carlo Salanitri was the owner of a lighting shop, Joe Salanitri was a salesman and Manfre worked as a scrap metal merchant. Sooshi Mango first gained popularity when they started in 2015 upon the virality of their video Italians Vs Greeks and Ethnic Dads on Facebook. Joe Salanitri said of the Ethnic Dads skit, "We decided to do a video about ethnic dads and that was the first video we did that sort of cracked eight, nine million views." Manfre thought of their heritage comedy, "It's important that we leave a legacy behind just to remember that they [our parents] were here, they worked hard and they contributed to the country for me. That's my motivation."

Sooshi Mango has worked with several personalities, including Nick Giannopoulos and Mary Coustas. The trio has been able to transform their comedy to the stage and has had success touring internationally and several times in Australia. Their first show on stage was ‘Star Wogs’ in 2018, which also featured Nick Giannopoulos, along with Mary Coustas. The Sooshi Mango crew have stated that they believe Star Wogs was the show that lifted their skills in acting. Sooshi Mango conducted two of their own shows in 2019. Ethnic Vacation – The Invasion of Canada was an international show that was performed in three of Canada's major cities. Fifty Shades Of Ethnic took place in Australia, which proved to be extremely successful in over 10 Australian cities.

Sooshi Mango later announced a new show named 'Off The Boat', that was set to come to the stage in 2021, however it was later rescheduled to early 2022 due to the COVID-19 pandemic. This show marked their biggest performance to date at the time, taking place in arenas. Before the delay was made, Sooshi Mango released a new brand of Pino Silvestre before Father's Day. September 2021 saw Sooshi Mango announce a new podcast titled Saucy Meatballs: A Podcast Not About Meatballs, which the trio had been wanting to host for over three years. In late 2021, Sooshi Mango were nominated for and won the AACTA Favourite Digital Comedy Creator award. Off The Boat finally concluded in September 2022 and the addition of extra and encore shows raised their total show count to 44. The show marked the troupe's biggest event.

Sooshi Mango made their debut in cinemas in October 2022, with a feature role for the trio in Giannopoulos' Wog Boy 3: Wog Boys Forever. Manfre told the Greek Herald, "It's an absolute honour and a privilege to be a part of the movie. We've all grown up watching it so to be a part of the trilogy is unbelievable." In 2022, it was confirmed that Sooshi Mango would begin scripting their own feature-length film. Sooshi Mango were nominated for the same AACTA Award in 2022.

In May 2024, the group announced Home Made, a 25-city Australian tour presented by Muscle Nation and running from August to November 2024. The itinerary combined regional theatres with capital-city arenas, including Qudos Bank Arena in Sydney, Rod Laver Arena in Melbourne, Brisbane Entertainment Centre, Adelaide Entertainment Centre and RAC Arena in Perth. The tour comprised 39 performances.

A follow-up run, Home Made Encore, toured Australia in 2025. By September 2025 the promoters reported sold-out shows in Brisbane, Wollongong, Canberra, Perth, Melbourne, Adelaide and Sydney, and announced additional dates at the Civic Theatre, Newcastle; the Coliseum Theatre, Sydney; and the Plenary at the Melbourne Convention and Exhibition Centre.

In December 2025, the group announced The Home Made World Tour, their first large-scale international tour, promoted by Live Nation. The announced itinerary comprised 50 performances between 23 April and 2 November 2026 across the United States, Canada, Germany, England, Scotland, Ireland, Italy, Poland, Cyprus, Greece, North Macedonia, Spain, France, Sweden, Denmark, and Bulgaria, with venues including The Town Hall in New York, Meridian Hall in Toronto, Eventim Apollo in London and Usher Hall in Edinburgh. A further performance was announced for Kino SC in Zagreb, Croatia, on 11 October 2026, the group's first show in that country.

On 13 October 2026, Screen Australia announced major production investment in the group's debut feature film, in association with VicScreen, as part of a funding round covering 75 narrative projects. Listed as "Untitled Sooshi Mango Project", the film concerns three Italian immigrants who rally their multicultural community to save a social club threatened by a health and wellness business. It is written by Joe Salanitri, Carlo Salanitri and Andrew Manfre with Declan Fay, and directed by Nick Kozakis. Cathy Rodda and Paul Dainty are producers, with Timothy Whiting as co-producer and Sashi Arnold as executive producer, for Pizza Oven Productions. Roadshow holds Australian distribution.

== Johnny, Vince & Sam's and Sangaweech ==
Sooshi Mango created a brand based on three of their most popular characters: the 'Ethnic Dads'. The character's names are: Johnny, Vince, and Sam. From this, the Johnny, Vince & Sam's Vino wine brand was born, with the first releases launched in 2022: the Sangiovese ’21, and the Moscato ’22. Later that year, the Johnny, Vince, and Sam's Sangiovese became the number one selling Sangiovese in all of Dan Murphy’s liquor merchant stores, Australia-wide.

In 2023, Sooshi Mango partnered with Johnny Di Francesco (Restauranteur and Director of Gradi Group), Dani Zeini (Royal Stacks burger restaurant founder), and Steven Ballerini (CEO of Australian freight and logistics management company Cora Group) to create and launch Johnny, Vince & Sam's Ristorante, in Lygon Street, Carlton, in Victoria, Australia, to much acclaim.

In 2023, the Johnny, Vince & Sam's Vino brand launched: Rosé ’23, Prosecco ’22, and Tiramisu (limited edition), again proving to be very well received.

In February 2026, the group opened Sangaweech, an Italian sandwich shop at 300 Lygon Street, Carlton, a few doors from Johnny, Vince & Sam's Ristorante. Occupying a former hair salon and styled after the migrant kitchens of the 1960s and 1970s, the shop serves twelve Italian sandwiches on house-baked rolls. It opened on 28 February 2026, with the first 500 customers given a free panini and queues reported to extend around three blocks.

== Cookbook ==
In November 2025 the group released Eat! An Italian Cookbook by Sooshi Mango: Mamma Knows Best, published by Murdoch Books. The book collects more than forty recipes attributed to the mothers of the three members, arranged in the order of an Italian family meal from antipasti through to desserts and drinks, and includes family photographs and anecdotes. Several dishes are presented under the names of the group's characters, including Carmela's cotoletta, Giuseppina's chicken brodo and Angela's pasta al forno.

== Podcast ==
=== Early episodes (2021–2023) ===
The podcast was announced in September 2021 under the title Saucy Meatballs: A Podcast Not About Meatballs, and was distributed through Spotify and YouTube. Its trailer reached the ten most-listened tracks on Spotify within 24 hours of release. Guests across its first two seasons included then-prime minister Scott Morrison, whose appearance drew national news coverage, as well as Tommy Little, Alexander Volkanovski, Andy Lee, Coolio, Tina Arena, Mick Gatto, Andrew Bogut, George Calombaris, Julia Morris, Santo Cilauro, Mick Molloy, Omid Djalili, Vince Colosimo and Russell Peters.

=== LiSTNR (from 2023) ===
In June 2023 the podcast joined Southern Cross Austereo's audio platform LiSTNR, which also took on its back catalogue, with new episodes released weekly on Mondays. LiSTNR's head of entertainment and culture, Sam Cavanagh, described the group as "a comedy smash hit".

=== Hiatus and return (2025–present) ===
The podcast went on hiatus following an episode published on 25 May 2025, in which the group announced a short break. It resumed on 12 October 2025 with an episode announcing a new recording studio and a partnership with Cavalo Prestige. The podcast's feed is published by Pivotal Connections, a video-first creator network launched in 2026 by the podcast production company Pivotal Conversations.

== Characters ==
Throughout the history of their comedy troupe, Sooshi Mango has featured numerous ethnic characters in their skits, videos, advertisements and theatre shows, all of which can be seen below. The Sooshi Mango cast revealed the characters' backstories in their 2022 show, Off The Boat.

=== Main characters ===
- Johnny (played by Joe Salanitri) – Johnny is one of Sooshi Mango's main characters and is portrayed by Joe Salanitri. He is made fun of by Vince and Sam for having a large nose. He has a wife and at least one son and daughter. He migrated to Australia with Vince and Sam in 1967. Johnny does not like his neighbour, Shane.
- Vince (played by Carlo Salanitri) – Vince is the second main character, played by Carlo Salanitri. He often jokes about his wife, Carmela, and has a love–hate relationship with both his adjacent neighbours, Nunzio and Jeff. Along with Johnny and Sam, Vince arrived in Australia in 1967. He and Carmela have a son.
- Sam (played by Andrew Manfre) – Andrew Manfre is the actor for the final main character that makes up Sooshi Mango's ethnic dads. In 1967, Sam went fishing with his friend, Gino, and their boat took them to Australia. At 15 years old, Gino took Sam's girlfriend, now wife, Angela. Gino died in 2020.

=== Recurring characters ===
- Giuseppina (played by Joe Salantri) – Johnny's wife, also played by Joe Salanitri. Giuseppina has been featured in numerous episodes with the rest of the ethnic mothers. Salanitri reprised his role of Giuseppina in an interview with Studio 10. Giuseppina and Johnny have a son and a daughter. Her daughter has slept with Angela's son, but is now engaged to a Greek man.
- Carmela (played by Carlo Salanitri) – Carlo Salanitri plays Carmela, Vince's wife. She and Vince often make fun of each other, and are confused as to why their son, Giuseppe, sees a psychologist. Carmela is not a fan of Giuseppe's wife, Sharon.
- Angela (played by Andrew Manfre) – The wife of Sam, whose son used to be in a relationship with Giuseppina's daughter. She and Sam have another ten children, including a daughter, and nine grandchildren. Angela had a crush on Sam's brother, but married Sam when his brother died.
- Costa (played by Carlo Salanitri) – The owner and boss of Kalamata Fish & Chips shop. He works at his shop with his nephew and Tasso. His nephew teases him for not being able to pronounce the word "chips".
- Tasso (played by Joe Salanitri) – A worker, who works in Kalamata Fish & Chips. He is from Kalamata. When migrating to Australia, he and Costa had the idea of starting a fish and chips business together.
- Stavro (played by Andrew Manfre) – A man, who comes to eat at Kalamata Fish & Chips. He explains that his cousin was run over by Uber Eats and that he had to sell his donkey to enable his wife to migrate to Australia, as he lost his money to the TAB. He is also beaten by his wife.
- Giacomo (played by Carlo Salanitri) – Carlo Salanitri also portrays old married man Giacomo, who gives marital advice to Joe, with the help of Pino. This character is based on real life Uncle to the trio, Chick Salanitri, while the location was swapped to Australia from the original location of Long Island, NY.
- Pino (played by Andrew Manfre) – An ethnic grandparent, who also gives advice to Joe. He has a wife. He and Giacomo came to Australia in the 1940s, when they accidentally boarded an immigration boat during World War II, believing it was an enemy ship.
- Joe (Note: In this video, , the gas salesman is wearing a lanyard that states his name is Joe.) (played by Joe Salanitri) – A young gas and steroids salesman, acted by Joe Salanitri. When he tries to sell gas, he ends up getting marital advice. Joe is on parole.
- Tasoula (played by Joe Salanitri) – The Greek wife of Stavro, played by Joe Salanitri, who bashes Stavro for his TAB losses. She and Stavro have five daughters.

== Reception ==
Sooshi Mango won the AACTA Favourite Digital Comedy Creator award in December 2021, in which they were contending against many entertaining personalities and were congratulated by many fans and celebrities, such as Scott Morrison.

Sooshi Mango's first show, Fifty Shades of Ethnic, went live 33 times in over 10 cities, completely selling out 14 times, while the trio have also brought their comedic skills to the international stage, airing shows in Canada's Toronto, Vancouver and Montréal. Aussie Theatre said that Sooshi Mango's Off The Boat tour will "bring the house down once more". Off The Boat broke the record of selling out three comedy shows at Rod Laver Arena and the entire tour sold over 100,000 tickets and 44 shows. Sooshi Mango have also done advertisements for a number of businesses, including Red Rooster and Azzurri Concrete. They have also branded their own line of Pino Silvestre.

Sooshi Mango has accumulated billions of views and followers across their socials channels with over 3.5m followers on Instagram and 122,000 subscribers on YouTube alone. The comedy trio have been interviewed by Sunrise and multiple times by Studio 10. Sooshi Mango's podcast trailer reached the top ten most listened tracks on Spotify within 24 hours of being released and their interview with Scott Morrison mocked various Australian "scandals", including Joe Biden forgetting Morrison's name, Franco-Australian tensions, Australian vaccine issues and the resignation of Gladys Berejiklian. Sky News thought that Morrison had "put himself at the mercy of comedians" during their podcast skit with him. Ruby Staley of Time Out branded their comedy "quick wit and relatable".

Reporting ahead of the group's 2026 Edinburgh date, the Edinburgh Evening News described them as the only comedy act to have sold out Rod Laver Arena three times consecutively, and reported that they had also sold out Qudos Bank Arena twice consecutively. The same report stated that Home Made had sold more than 150,000 tickets in Australia, describing it as one of the country's highest-selling comedy tours.

In 2026, Nine News profiled the group in a segment describing them as "one of Australia's biggest comedy exports", tracing their progression from suburban Melbourne to sold-out shows internationally.
