= Dear Life =

Dear Life may refer to:

== Music ==
- Dear Life (album), by High Valley, 2016
  - "Dear Life" (High Valley song), 2016
- "Dear Life" (Delta Goodrem song), 2016
- "Dear Life", a song by Beck from Colors, 2017
- "Dear Life", a song by the Corrs from Jupiter Calling, 2017
- "Dear Life", a song by Melanie C from Version of Me, 2016

== Other uses ==
- Dear Life (Clarke book), a 2020 memoir by Rachel Clarke
- Dear Life (Munro book), a 2012 short story collection by Alice Munro
- Dear Life (TV series), a 2026 Australian comedy-drama series
- Dear Zindagi (lit. 'Dear Life'), a 2016 Indian drama film by Gauri Shinde
