= Costas Kilias =

Greek Australian magistrate and actor (born 1960)

- Born: Constantinos Nikiforos Kilias; 23 May 1960 (age 66); Melbourne, Australia
- Occupations: Magistrate and Film actor
- Years active: 1997–current
- Known for: The Castle (1997); The Wog Boy (2000); Fat Tony & Co. (2014); The Wannabes (2003); Fat Pizza (2003)

Constantinos "Costas" Kilias (Greek: Κωνσταντίνος "Κώστας" Κίλιας) is a Greek Australian magistrate and actor.

== Early life ==
Kilias is the son of Greek immigrants who arrived in Australia in 1954, from the town of Kolindros, in the region of Macedonia in Northern Greece.

== Legal career ==
After graduating from the University of Melbourne in the early 1980s, Kilias was admitted to the Victorian Bar in 1986.

Kilias currently works as a magistrate in Melbourne.

== Acting career ==
Kilias is best known for his role as Farouk in The Castle (1997), as well as Tony the Yugoslav in The Wog Boy (2000) and Wog Boy 2: Kings of Mykonos (2010). He also had roles in Fat Tony & Co. (2014) as the Head of Hellenic Anti Drug Dept and in the film The Wannabes (2003) as Adrian. He also appeared in some episodes of Fat Pizza (2003).

== Filmography ==
=== Film ===
Year	Title	Role	Type
1997	The Castle	Farouk	Feature film
1998	Head On	Taxi Driver	Feature film
2000	The Wog Boy	Tony the Yugoslav	Feature film
2003	Roy Hollsdotter Live	Lionel	TV movie
2003	The Wannabes	Adrian	Feature film
2006	Wil	Insurance Salesman	Feature film
2007	The Price of Friendship	Salesman	Short film
2008	Two Fists, One Heart	Costa Akidis	Feature film
2009	Blessed	Chris	Feature film
2010	Wog Boy 2: Kings of Mykonos	Tony the Yugoslav	Feature film
2011	Big Mamma's Boy	Mr Cotoletta	Feature film
2012	Great Western	Yousef	Short film
2014	The Day of the Broken		Feature film
2016	Degree of Separation	Alexan	Short film

=== Television ===
Year	Title	Role	Type
1998	SeaChange	Dave	TV series, season 1, episode 6: "One of the Gang"
1998	Blue Heelers	Osman Demir	TV series, season 5, episode 33: "Turkish Delight"
1999	The Adventures of Lano and Woodley	Postman Rob	TV series, 2 episodes
2001; 2003	Pizza	Husband / Wrestler	TV series, season 2 & 3, 2 episodes
2003	Fat Pizza	Dimitri, Russian Boss	TV series
2007	Kick	George	TV miniseries, 1 episode
2009	John Safran’s Race Relations	Rabbi Groner	TV series, 3 episodes
2010	City Homicide	Kostas Emmanouel	TV series, season 4, episode 13: "Once Bitten"
2014	Fat Tony & Co.	George Saxionis (Head of Hellenic Anti Drug Dept)	TV miniseries, episode 7: "The Incorruptibles"

== Stage ==
Year	Title	Role	Type
1984	Screw Loose: Law Revue		University of Melbourne
