= Wog Boy 2: Kings of Mykonos =

- Theatrical poster
- Directed by: Peter Andrikidis
- Written by: Chris Anastassiades; Nick Giannopoulos
- Produced by: Chris Anastassiades; Nick Giannopoulos
- Starring: Nick Giannopoulos; Vince Colosimo; Zeta Makripoulia; Costas Kilias; Alex Dimitriades; Kevin Sorbo
- Music by: Amanda Brown; Nick West
- Production companies: G.O. Films; Film Victoria; See-Saw Films
- Distributed by: Paramount Pictures
- Release date: 20 May 2010
- Running time: 102 minutes
- Countries: Australia; Greece
- Languages: English; Greek; Italian
- Budget: $5 million
- Box office: AU$6.9 million (US$4.5 million)

Wog Boy 2: Kings of Mykonos is a 2010 Australian comedy film directed by Peter Andrikidis, starring Nick Giannopoulos, Vince Colosimo and Costas Kilias. It is the second part of the Wog Boy trilogy, succeeding The Wog Boy (2000) and preceding Wog Boys Forever (2022). It was released in Australia on 20 May 2010 and UK on 7 January 2011. The film received negative reviews.

== Plot ==
The film starts off with the funeral of a man named Panos. A very rich and handsome young man called Mihalis thinks he inherits all Panos' possessions but Panos has left all his estate to someone else. Soon after the funeral, cousin Tzimis rings Steve Karamitsis to announce he has inherited a beach worth 2.5 million euros, a tavern and a small house on the Greek resort island of Mykonos from his uncle Panos that he had never met. Steve watches his friend Tony the Yugoslav as he gets arrested in his father's shop for theft and drugs, losing the shop and his beloved '69 Chrysler VF Valiant Pacer. Steve and his old friend Frank who has lost his wife and his mistress fly together to Mykonos. Cousin Tzimis picks up the two friends from the airport and brings Steve up to speed with local customs and habits. Tzimis and his Spartan wife Voula are managing the tavern Steve has inherited. Steve finds out that to get his inheritance, he must pay 1.1 million euros in tax because he is not an immediate descendant of Panos. Steve does not have that much money. The two friends settle in Panos' home and discover Panos' old car, a rare 1964 Pontiac Catalina and a Kri kri goat called Apollo.

Later Tony shows up, having managed to escape from the Australian authorities and calling himself Tony the Cretan, thinking that Crete is not a part of Greece. Two German environmentalists, Otto and Dieter, are after the goat Apollo claiming it is a rare species. Steve falls for Zoe, a beautiful down-to-earth singer who owns half of a local night club called "the Seven Sins". The other half is owned by Mihalis who is engaged to Zoe. Frank gets into a nasty bet with Pierluigi (Kevin Sorbo), who is called the King of Mykonos because he had sex with 43 women in one month, "a record that will never be broken" as Tzimis says. The bet is to seduce Enza (Cosima Coppola), a strikingly beautiful but distant and snob Italian girl.

As the story progresses, it is revealed that no one is who it seems to be. Pierluigi is not Italian but an American and has a secret agenda, Mihalis has ulterior motive for taking over the beach, Steve is not as 'wog' as he thinks he is, Frank is not as successful with women, Zoe has a tragic past and is blackmailed by Mihalis, Enza is not snob after all and Panos was actually Steve's biological father.

Steve fails to find hard evidence to prove Panos is his father. Mihalis steps in and claims the inheritance for himself, declaring that he can pay up for taxes. He intends to sell the beach. Steve then enters a rally competition with Mihalis trying to take the inheritance. Tony gets the parts needed for Steve to repair the Pontiac and race against Mihalis' Porsche 997. The two Germans interrupt the rally and reveal that they have discovered an ancient coin of great archaeological significance at Steve's beach, but Apollo swallowed it. If the coin is retrieved and delivered to the authorities, the beach becomes an archaeological site and cannot be exploited or sold. Mihalis and Steve abandon the race, search for and fight over the coin.

At the last moment, Zoe steps in and delivers documents proving Panos was Steve's biological father. Steve gets the inheritance and gives up the beach to become a historical site named "Apollo" after the goat, Zoe is finally free from Mihalis' grasp and the film ends with the people of the island singing Down Under by Men at Work.

== Cast ==
- Nick Giannopoulos as Steve Karamitsis
- Vince Colosimo as Frank
- Zeta Makrypoulia as Zoe
- Costas Kilias as Tony the Yugoslav (or Tony the Cretan)
- Alex Dimitriades as Mihalis
- Kevin Sorbo as Pierluigi
- Cosima Coppola as Enza
- Dimitris Starovas as Tzimis
- Galini Tseva as Voula
- Xander Allanous as Stavros
- Tony Nikolakopoulos as Theo
- Thomas Heyne as Otto
- Mario Hertel as Dieter

== Reception ==
The film has received mixed reviews. Review aggregate Rotten Tomatoes reports that 42% of critics have given the film a positive review based on 9 reviews, with an average score of 5.1/10.

On At the Movies film critics Margaret Pomeranz and David Stratton both gave the film a negative review, awarding it 2.5 and 2 stars out of five respectively.

Shaun Micallef was known to use the movie as a running joke.

== Sequel ==
A third film, Wog Boys Forever, began production in 2021 and was released on 10 October 2022.

== See also ==
- Cinema of Australia
- Cinema of Greece
