= The Wog Boy =

- Theatrical release poster
- Directed by: Aleksi Vellis
- Written by: Nick Giannopoulos; Chris Anastassides
- Produced by: Nick Giannopoulos; Aleksi Vellis
- Starring: Nick Giannopoulos; Vince Colosimo; Lucy Bell; Abi Tucker; John Barresi; Stephen Curry; Hung Le; Geraldine Turner; Tony Nikolakopoulos; Derryn Hinch
- Distributed by: 20th Century Fox (Australia)
- Release dates: 9 February 2000 (Premiere); 24 February 2000 (Australia)
- Running time: 92 minutes
- Countries: Australia; Greece
- Languages: English; Greek; Italian
- Box office: $11,449,799

The Wog Boy is a 2000 Australian comedy film directed by Aleksi Vellis and starring Nick Giannopoulos, Vince Colosimo, Lucy Bell, Abi Tucker, Stephen Curry, Tony Nikolakopoulos and Derryn Hinch. Whilst the word 'wog' is extremely derogatory in British English, in Australian English it may be considered non-offensive depending on how the word is used, due to reclamation and changing connotations.

At the ARIA Music Awards of 2000 the soundtrack was nominated for Best Original Soundtrack Album. It is the first part of Giannopoulous's eponymous Wog Boy trilogy, preceding Wog Boy 2: Kings of Mykonos (2010) and Wog Boys Forever (2022).

== Plot ==
Steve (Nick Giannopoulos) is a first-generation Greek Australian. Steve is unemployed, but manages to get by, helping out here and there. His pride and joy is his Chrysler VF Valiant Pacer. Whilst helping out a compensation-oriented neighbour, Steve has a minor car accident involving the Minister for Employment, Raelene Beagle-Thorpe (Geraldine Turner). The net result of this encounter is twofold: Steve gets to meet Celia (Lucy Bell) whom he is instantly attracted to but who initially hates him, and Steve gets outed on national television by Derryn Hinch as the worst dole-bludger in Australia.

Steve manages to turn this around to his advantage, and becomes famous as The Wog Boy, spearheading a campaign to improve the employment status of the country. In the interim, he makes variable progress with Celia.

== Cast ==
- Nick Giannopoulos as Steve Karamitsis
- Vince Colosimo as Frank
- Lucy Bell as Celia O'Brien
- John Barresi as Domenic
- Stephen Curry as Nathan
- Geraldine Turner as Raelene Beagle-Thorpe
- Abi Tucker as Annie O'Brien
- Tony Nikolakopoulos as Theo
- Derryn Hinch as himself
- Geoff Paine as Nick
- Costas Kilias as Tony
- Vince D'Amico as Mario
- Kim Gyngell as The Supervisor
- Trent Huen as Van
- Hung Le as Tran
- Peter Hosking as Bazza
- Lucy Taylor as Shazza
- Vincent Gara as Young Steve
- Peter Stefanou as Fulvio
- Bud Tingwell as Walker
- Robert Ratti as Andy
- Robert Rabiah as Pietro
- Dino Marnika as Reporter
- Gerry Connolly as Father Murphy

== Car ==
Steve (Nick Giannopoulos) is seen driving a dark blue 1969 VF Valiant hardtop during the movie, which was allegedly given to him by his father. During the film, it is said that the car's original engine was a 245-cubic-inch (4.0 L) 6-cylinder hemi, which was later replaced with an 8-cylinder engine.

The Australian Chrysler Valiant range of cars were often and sometimes still referred to as "Wog Chariots" or "The Greek Mercedes."

== Soundtrack ==
A soundtrack was released, composed by Cezary Skubiszewski. It featured the single "Breakin'... There's No Stoppin' Us" by Ilanda, which was used to promote the film.

The track "Get Tzatziki With It" was also in the film's promotional campaign, and is played in the actual movie itself. It was written by John Von Ahlen, Jaime Jimenez and Nick Giannopoulos and recorded at Subterrane Recording Studio.

=== Songs ===
1. "Pull Up to the Bumper" - Deni Hines
2. "Breakin'... There's No Stopping Us" - Ilanda & Joanne
3. "(She's got that) Vibe" - Redzone
4. "Shine" - Vanessa Amorosi
5. "Somebody Like You" - Jimmy Christo
6. "Am I Sexy?" - The Lords of Acid
7. "You Should Be Dancing" - Blockster
8. "Born to Be Alive" - Patrick Hernandez
9. "Love Lies Bleeding" - Sonic Animation
10. "Bang-A-Boomerang" - The Mavis's
11. "Love Theme From 'The Wog Boy' " - Cezary Skubiszewski
12. "Get Tzatziki With It" - Planet J ft Nicky GiO
13. "Pull Up to the Bumper (Club Mix)" - Deni Hines

== Release ==
The Wog Boy premiered in Melbourne on 9 February 2000. It previewed on 180 screens over the weekend of 18 to 20 February and grossed $1.2 million in three days, the biggest ever preview grosses for an Australian film and enough to have ranked third at the Australian box office for the week. It officially opened on 200 screens on 24 February and grossed $10 million in its first five weeks. It went on to gross $11,449,799 at the box office in Australia, becoming the tenth highest-grossing Australian film of all time.

== Sequels ==
A sequel, Wog Boy 2: Kings of Mykonos, began production in October 2009 with Nick Giannopoulos and Vince Colosimo returning in the cast. The sequel was released in Australia on 20 May 2010.

In June 2021, a third film Wog Boys Forever was released in October 2022.
