= Growing Up Smith =

- Official theatrical poster
- Directed by: Frank Lotito
- Written by: Anjul Nigam; Paul Quinn; Gregory Scott Houghton
- Produced by: Anjul Nigam; Frank Lotito; Steve Straka
- Starring: Jason Lee; Anjul Nigam; Brighton Sharbino; Hilarie Burton; Roni Akurati
- Cinematography: Thomas Scott Stanton
- Edited by: Joshua Rathmell
- Music by: Michael Lira
- Production companies: Brittany House Pictures; Emedia Films; Quixotic Road
- Distributed by: Good Deed Entertainment
- Release dates: June 1, 2015 (Seattle); February 3, 2017
- Running time: 103 minutes
- Country: United States
- Language: English
- Budget: $2 million
- Box office: $35,300

Growing Up Smith is a 2015 comedy-drama film written by Anjul Nigam, Paul Quinn, and Gregory Scott Houghton. It was produced by Anjul Nigam, Frank Lotito, and Steve Straka and directed by Frank Lotito.

The movie takes place in 1979, when an Indian family moves to America with hopes of living the American Dream. While their 10-year-old boy Smith falls head-over-heels for the girl next door, his desire to become a "good old boy" propels him further away from his family's ideals than ever before.

== Plot ==
Growing Up Smith is a coming-of-age story of Smith, a 10-year-old boy from India growing up in small-town America in 1979.

As the boy's family tries to straddle the fine line between embracing the American Dream and preserving their Indian heritage, the awkward little hero sneaks out for a taste of Kentucky Fried Chicken (even though his family is vegetarian), dons a Saturday Night Fever costume, and contends with his parents as they send him to school with a yellow squash instead of a pumpkin to carve for Halloween.

And as Smith falls head-over-heels in love with Amy, the girl-next-door, he finds in Amy's father Butch the all-American cowboy he wishes his own father could be. But alas, when Smith goes on a hunting adventure with Butch, Butch injures himself while chasing a doe. Smith's rescuing Butch makes him a local hero, but his father's jealousy strains his relationship with him. With Butch unable to work, his wife decides to move away from the house and takes Amy with her. Amy, unable to deal with the turmoil in her own family, threatens to run away. Smith leaves the house on his bike to meet up with her, though Butch arrives soon after and prevents her from doing so. Smith's parents, in the meantime, search for him and find his sister making out with a boy. Furious, they condemn his sister to studying, and upon Smith's return banish him back to India after he declares his love for Amy. Nineteen years pass in India, with Smith becoming a neurosurgeon and finding a woman to marry. Smith's wife dies of a complication - though unknown - that Smith himself tries to cure.

Smith returns to his hometown in America, where his sister has a family with Patrick (the same boy she was found making out with nineteen years earlier) and lives in the same house as before. Smith reconnects with Butch, and finds out Amy still lives in her grandmother's house as a fourth-grade teacher, though she is unmarried and has a child. The movie concludes with Smith re-affirming his desire to meet Amy and riding out on the same old bike to do so.

== Cast ==
- Jason Lee as Butch Brunner
- Anjul Nigam as Bhaaskar Bhatnagar
- Brighton Sharbino as Amy Brunner
- Hilarie Burton as Nancy Brunner
- Roni Akurati as Smith Bhatnagar
  - Samrat Chakrabarti as Older Smith Bhatnager
- Poorna Jagannathan as Nalini Bhatnagar
- Shoba Narayan as Asha Bhatnagar
- Jake Busey as Officer Dick
- Tim Guinee as Officer Bob
- Alison Wright as Mrs. Reynolds
- Brianna Denski as Trick-or-Treater/Student (uncredited)

== Production ==
The film was produced on a budget of $2 million. It was originally produced and exhibited in some festivals under the title "Good Ol' Boy", before Good Deed Entertainment has acquired the film for a theatrical release.

The movie was shot in New York's Hudson Valley, about 90 miles (140 km) north of New York City. The scene in the movie in which Smith crosses the bridge on his bicycle was filmed on the Kingston-Port Ewen Suspension Bridge crossing Rondout Creek between the town of Esopus and the city of Kingston.

== Release ==
The film premiered on June 1, 2015, at the Seattle International Film Festival. It was the Opening Night Film at the Cleveland International Film Festival and the SouthSide Film Festival.

It received a limited U.S. theatrical release in select cities on February 3, 2017, before expanding wider on February 10, 2017.

The film got mostly positive reviews, with a 73% approval rating from 11 critics and an average rating of 7.6 out of 10 on Rotten Tomatoes. It received Time magazine's Pick of the Week and went on to win Best Narrative Feature at the Woodstock Film Festival, Naples International Film Festival, Prescott Film Festival, and also winning the Best Narrative at CAAMFest and the Best Family Film at Garden State Film Festival.
