= Vince Colosimo =

Australian actor

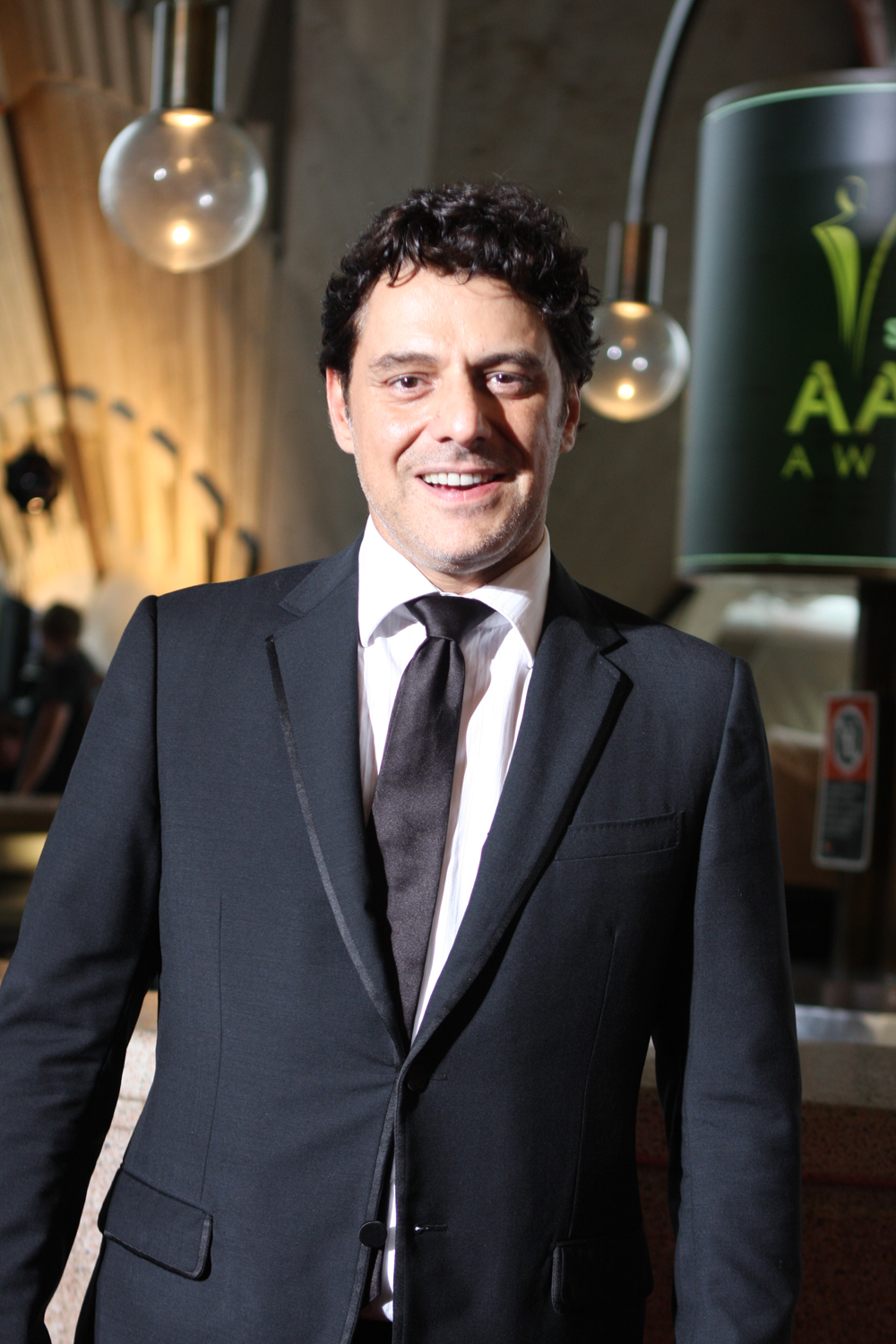
- Colosimo at the Australian Academy of Cinema and Television Arts Awards
- Born: Vincenzo Colosimo; Melbourne, Victoria, Australia
- Occupations: Actor, businessman
- Years active: 1983–present
- Spouse: Jane Hall (1996–2007)
- Children: 2

Vincenzo Colosimo is an Australian stage, television and screen actor. He has worked in both Australia and the United States. He is of Italian descent and lives in Melbourne, Australia. He was previously married to Australian actress Jane Hall.

== Early life ==
Colosimo was born in Melbourne, one of four children of Italian-born parents from Calabria. He grew up in the inner city suburb of Carlton North.

== Career ==
=== Film ===
Colosimo has had success in film and television in Australia and abroad. He debuted in the coming-of-age story Moving Out in 1983 and featured in 1984's Street Hero.

Other credits include the cult movie Chopper (2000), in which he played Melbourne drug dealer Neville Bartos opposite Eric Bana; The Wog Boy (2000); Lantana (2001); Walking on Water (2002); The Nugget (2002); Take Away (2003); and Opal Dream (2006). In 2008, he starred alongside Leonardo DiCaprio in the 2008 American film Body of Lies. In 2010, Colosimo starred in the sequel Wog Boy 2: Kings of Mykonos. Colosimo also appeared in the vampire film Daybreakers, starring alongside Sam Neill, Willem Dafoe and Ethan Hawke.

In 2011 he starred in the film Face to Face, and in 2012 he starred in Starz "Spartacus" Season 4, portraying a pirate leader.

In 2013 he appeared as a coffee shop owner in The Great Gatsby alongside Leonardo DiCaprio.

He appeared in the 2018 film The Second.

=== Television ===
Despite several movie roles and guest roles in A Country Practice (1994), Good Guys Bad Guys (1997) and Stingers (2002), it was not until his performance as Joe Sabatini in Something in the Air in 2001 and 2002 that resulted in wider exposure. In 2003, he starred in the telemovie, After the Deluge. In 2003 and 2004, he played Dr. Rex Mariani in The Secret Life of Us. Colosimo also starred as himself in episode 6 of the hit ABC series We Can Be Heroes.

Colosimo had a three episode guest role in Blue Heelers in 2005, followed by roles in MDA (2005), Two Twisted (2006) and City Homicide (2007). His American credits include popular shows such as The Practice (2004) and Without a Trace (2003).

2008 was a busy year for Colosimo. He portrayed Melbourne gangland figure Alphonse Gangitano in the Channel 9 series Underbelly (in a guest role); Channel Ten's telemovie Emerald Falls and Channel Nine's Scorched. He also appeared in Top Gear Australia's "Star in a bog-standard car" section in the first episode.

In early 2009, Colosimo appeared in Carla Cametti PD, a six-part series that aired on SBS. In 2010, he had the leading male role in the tele-movie, Wicked Love: The Maria Korp Story about the Maria Korp case.

In 2012 he and his ancestors featured in the SBS show, Who Do You Think You Are?

He reprising his role of Alphonse Gangitano in the Underbelly sequel/spin-off series Fat Tony & Co. in 2013, featuring in one episode.

In May 2022, Colosimo appeared as a contestant on the sixth season of The Celebrity Apprentice Australia.

=== Other endeavours ===
Colosimo was part-owner of a cafe in Northcote, Espresso Alley, with Vince Mazzone.

A sample of Colosimo's voice appears in "Snitch" by Vanessa Amorosi from her 2009 album Hazardous.

In 2026 Colosimo appeared in the music video for the song "Level 5" by fellow Australian band King Gizzard & the Lizard Wizard.

== Personal life ==
He has a daughter, Lucia (born 2002), with his former wife, actress Jane Hall. Colosimo and Hall worked together on A Country Practice in 1994. He lived in Westgarth, a suburb of Melbourne, until late 2015. The mother of his second child is Australian actress Diana Glenn with whom he had a son, Massimo, in April 2014. The couple separated two months after the birth of Massimo. Since 2017 his partner has been Sabella Sugar, a producer at Ultrafilms.

In September 2016, Colosimo was charged by police after he was found in possession of methamphetamine in Melbourne's north. In January 2017, he appeared in court where he had pleaded guilty and was fined $1000 without conviction and was put under a good behaviour bond for a year.

In October 2022, Colosimo was fined $2500 for drunk driving and lying to the police about his identity.

== Credits ==
=== Film ===
Year	Title	Role	Notes
1983	Moving Out	Gino	Feature film Nominated – AACTA Award for Best Actor in a Leading Role
1984	Street Hero	Vinnie	Feature film
1988	All the Way	Joe Bianchi	TV miniseries
1993	Seven Deadly Sins	Sloth	TV miniseries
2000	The Wog Boy	Frank	Feature film
2000	Chopper	Neville Bartos	Feature film
2001	Lantana	Nik Daniels	Feature film AACTA Award for Best Actor in a Supporting Role; Nominated — FCCA Award for Best Supporting Actor
2002	Walking on Water	Charlie	Feature film Nominated – AACTA Award for Best Actor in a Leading Role; Nominated — FCCA Award for Best Leading Actor; Nominated – IF Award for Best Actor
2002	The Hard Word	Detective Mike Kelly	Feature film
2002	Secret Bridemaids' Business	James William Davis	TV movie
2002	The Nugget	Dimitri	Feature film
2003	Ain't Got No Jazz	Bartender	Short Film
2003	After the Deluge	Eric	TV movie
2003	Take Away	Tony Stilano	Feature film
2005	BlackJack: Sweet Science	Nick Delos	TV movie
2005	Life	Michael Cardamone	TV movie
2006	Opal Dream	Rex Williamson	Feature film
2006	Solo	Keeling	Feature film
2007	St. George		Short film
2008	Emerald Falls	Ned Montoya	TV movie
2008	Scorched	Michael Francia	TV movie
2008	Body of Lies	Skip	Feature film
2009	Daybreakers	Christopher Caruso	Feature film
2010	Wicked Love: The Maria Korp Story	Joe Korp	TV movie
2010	Wog Boy 2: Kings of Mykonos	Frank	Feature film
2011	Panic at Rock Island	Hirsch	TV movie
2011	Face to Face	Greg Baldoni	Newport Beach Film Festival Jury Award for Best Actor; Nominated – IF Award for Best Actor
2011	Swerve	Sam	Feature film
2013	The Great Gatsby	Michaelis	Feature film
2013	The 34th Battalion	Donnelly	Pre-Production
2014	Schapelle	Corby's Lawyer	TV movie
2023	Wog Boy 3: Wog Boys Forever	Frank	Feature film
2022	Girl at the Window	Chris	Feature Film

=== Television ===
Year	Title	Role	Notes
1994	A Country Practice	Sergeant Danny Sabatini	TV series, 4 episodes
1997	Good Guys, Bad Guys	Zoran	TV series, episode: "Gone to the Dogs"
1999	Halifax f.p.	Detective Johnson	TV series, episode: "Someone You Know"
2000	Stingers	Paul Braun	TV series, 3 episodes
2001–02	Something in the Air	Joe Sabatini	TV series, 29 episodes
2003	Kath & Kim	Jared	TV series, episode: "Obsession"
2003	Without a Trace	Gus Finn	TV series, episode: "Trip Box"
2004	The Practice	Matthew Billings	TV series, 5 episodes
2005	Blue Heelers	Bill Lapscott	TV series, 3 episodes
2005	MDA	Dr. Andrew Morello	TV series, 4 episodes
2005	We Can Be Heroes	Himself	TV series, episode 6
2006	Two Twisted	Duncan Cross	TV series, episode: "Love Crimes"
2007	City Homicide	Ernie Calabrese	TV series, 2 episodes
2008	Underbelly	Alphonse Gangitano	TV miniseries, 2 episodes Nominated – Logie Award for Most Outstanding Actor
2009	Carla Cometti PD	Luciano Gandolfi	TV series
2010	The Librarians	Adrian Green	TV series, 3 episodes
2010	Australian Families of Crime	Narrator	TV series, episode: "Killer Couple: David and Catherine McBirnie"
2010	Cops LAC	Dominic Salter	TV series, episode: "I'll See You"
2012	Miss Fisher's Murder Mysteries	Hector Chambers	TV series, episode: "Murder in Montparnasse"
2013	Spartacus: War of the Damned	Herocleo	TV series, 3 episodes
2013	Janet King	Jack Rizzoli	TV series, 8 episodes
2014	Fat Tony & Co.	Alphonse Gangitano	TV miniseries, 1 episode
2014	It's A Date	Harry	TV series, 1 episode
2017	The Warriors	Mark Spinotti	TV series
2018	Underbelly Files: Chopper	Alphonse Gangitano	TV miniseries, 2 episodes
2019	Reef Break	Mr. Pink	TV series, 3 episodes
2024	Last Days of the Space Age	Rocco Giliberto	TV series, 7 episodes

=== Music video ===
Year	Title	Role	Notes
2026	Level 5		Cameo appearance

== Awards ==
AFI Awards

- 1982 – Nominated for "Best Actor in a Lead Role" (for Moving Out)
- 2001 – Won for "Best Actor in a Supporting Role" (for Lantana)
- 2002 – Nominated for "Best Actor in a Lead Role" (for Walking on Water)
- 2008 – Nominated for "Best Guest or Supporting Actor in a Television Drama" (for Underbelly)

Logie Awards

- 2009 – Nominated for "Most Outstanding Actor" (for Underbelly)

Newport Beach Film Festival, USA

- 2011 – Jury Award for best actor for Face to Face.
