= Nick Giannopoulos =

Australian stand-up comedian and actor (born 1963)

- Born: Nicholas Giannopoulos; 1 July 1963 (age 63); Melbourne, Victoria, Australia
- Occupations: Comedian, actor, film director
- Years active: 1987–present

Nicholas "Nick" Giannopoulos (Greek: Νικόλαος Γιαννόπουλος, romanized: Nikólaos Giannópoulos; born 1 July 1963) is an Australian stand-up comedian, stage, TV and film actor and film director. He is best known for his comedy stage show Wogs Out of Work alongside George Kapiniaris, the television sitcom Acropolis Now and The Wog Boy film series and has been described as "Australia's leading exponent of "wog" humour".

== Early life and education ==
Giannopoulos was born in Melbourne, the first-born son of Greek immigrant parents. He grew up in working class origins, his father ran a milk bar, which he staffed sometimes from a young age, while his mother was a machinist. Growing up at the time, Australia was a racially divided country, though in Richmond, Victoria there were a community of Greek Australian of which he was part.

He grew up in the inner Melbourne suburbs of Fitzroy and Richmond and attended Abbotsford Primary School and Richmond High School. In 1981 he was accepted into the drama course at Rusden State College, where he also was a student in media studies. He left Rusden halfway through his course when he auditioned and was accepted into the Drama School at the Victorian College of the Arts, from where he eventually graduated.

== Career ==
=== Comedy ===
After facing challenges about progressing his career, partly because casting was difficult because of his Greek origins, Giannopoulos saved up his dole cheques and put on his first show, Wogs out of work at the Melbourne International Comedy Festival in 1987. The show was wildly successful, toured around Australia, and remains one of the highest grossing Australian created live shows of all time. He has followed up Wogs Out of Work with the Wog Boys, Wog-A-Rama and Wog Story stage shows. Giannopoulos has also made appearances at the Melbourne Comedy Festival, as well as co-authored books. In 1990–1991, he toured Australia to full house audiences for eight months as the star of the stage production of Acropolis Now Live Onstage, which he co-produced. In 1993–1995, he toured Australia with his ethnic comedy stage show Wog-A-Rama. In the 1990s, he toured Australia with his ethnic comedy stage show Wogboys.

In 2019, Giannopoulos joined the Sooshi Mango boys and Mary Coustas on stage in a show named Fifty Shades of Ethnic.

=== Television ===
Giannopoulos was one of the creators and stars of the television sitcom Acropolis Now. It was a popular TV show based on Greek-Australians maintaining a Greek café in Melbourne. It consisted of 5 seasons with 3 main characters throughout the shows series. The show aired from 1989 until 1992, on Channel Seven. Acropolis Now had higher ratings than 60 Minutes and A Current Affair.

In 2004, Giannopoulos hosted and produced the TV special Greece Is The Word on the Seven Network and repeated before the Athens Olympics Opening Ceremony. In 2005, he developed a new comedy series Get Nicked that was commissioned by the Seven Network but was cancelled just before going into production.

=== Acting ===
In 1990, Giannopoulos was the director and star of the play The Heartbreak Kid with which he toured Australia. In 1991 he played Danny Zuko in the David Atkins production of the musical Grease at the Footbridge Theatre in Sydney.

=== Film ===
Giannopoulos' film credits include The Wog Boy (2000), which is the 20th highest grossing Australian movie of all time. In 2003, he directed, wrote, and starred in The Wannabes. In 2010, he starred in Wog Boy 2: Kings of Mykonos, and had a cameo in 2014's Fat Pizza vs. Housos. In June 2021, it was announced that Wog Boy 3: Wog Boys Forever was in production, with a tentative release scheduled for 2022.

== Personal life ==
Giannopoulos dated fellow comedian, his Acropolis Now co-star Mary Coustas for five years while in their 20s. As of 2017, he was in a relationship with Natalie Neville / DJ Femme after meeting a party in St Kilda.

== Awards ==
=== Mo Awards ===
The Australian Entertainment Mo Awards (commonly known informally as the Mo Awards), were annual Australian entertainment industry awards. They recognise achievements in live entertainment in Australia from 1975 to 2016. Nick Giannopoulos won two awards in that time. and the Comedy Star of The Year award.

Year	Nominee / work	Award	Result (wins only)
1997	Nick Giannopoulos	New Wave Comedy Performer of the Year	Won
1999	Nick Giannopoulos	New Wave Comedy Performer of the Year	Won
