= The Old Way =

2023 Western film by Brett Donowho

- Theatrical release poster
- Directed by: Brett Donowho
- Written by: Carl W. Lucas
- Produced by: R. Bryan Wright; Micah Haley; Sasha Yelaun; Robert Paschall Jr.; Brett Donowho; Colin Floom; Fred Roos
- Starring: Nicolas Cage; Ryan Kiera Armstrong; Noah Le Gros; Clint Howard; Kerry Knuppe; Nick Searcy; Shiloh Fernandez
- Cinematography: Sion Michel
- Edited by: Frederick Wardell
- Music by: Andrew Morgan Smith
- Production companies: Saturn Films; Capstone Pictures; Intercut Capital; Tri-Fold Pictures; EchoWolf Productions
- Distributed by: Saban Films
- Release date: January 6, 2023
- Running time: 95 minutes
- Country: United States
- Language: English
- Box office: $59,729

The Old Way is a 2023 American Western film directed by Brett Donowho, from a screenplay by Carl W. Lucas, and starring Nicolas Cage as a retired gunman on a mission to find the outlaws who killed his wife.

The film was theatrically released by Saban Films on January 6, 2023, and received mixed reviews by critics.

== Plot ==
In 1878 in the Montana Territory, Colton Briggs (Nicolas Cage) is a member of a posse organized to arrest and hang the brother of Walter McCallister, a notorious bandit. Walter and his men try to foil the execution, resulting in a shootout that leaves Colton and McCallister son, James, as the only survivors. Colton is forced to kill McCallister in front of his son before riding away.

Twenty years later, Colton runs a general store with his wife and daughter; Ruth and Brooke. On a day that Colton walks Brooke into school, Ruth is harassed by James McCallister after his gang arrive at the family's home. Ruth, warns the gang that Colton will have revenge against them if they harm her.

Colton and Brooke return to find Franklin Jarret, the U.S. Marshal tracking the McCallister gang, waiting at the farm. Jarret explains that Ruth was killed, but refuses to disclose the names of the gang members to Colton. Franklin recognizes Colton, ostensibly from his gunfighting days, and fears he will go after the men and get killed or arrested, leaving Brooke as an orphan. Franklin tells Brooke that he knew Colton when he was a "violent man" and notices that Brooke does not seem upset about her mother's death. That night, Colton retrieves his guns and brings Brooke with him on the trail; he burns their house and barn.

Jarret and his deputies are set upon by the McAllister gang; several deputies are killed and two are wounded. Elsewhere on the trail, Colton hears the fighting. When the Briggs family find Jarret, he still refuses to tell them who he is pursuing. Colton seemingly prepares to torture a wounded deputy, so Jarret tells Colton about the gang and their presumed destination, a lockbox hidden by James McCallister. Colton's apparent torture preparations were instead preparations for surgery. He removes a bullet from the deputy’s wound and cauterizes it. Brooke and Colton take their guns and horses and continue.

The gang eventually find James' lockbox, but are angered when it is full of pesos. James tells them they can take their share and flee to Mexico, or stay with him and go to a town where they can use the pesos. They stay together and go to Santa Rosa; James knows Colton will be following them, so they wait.

Reaching Santa Rosa, Colton tells Brooke to visit a local shopkeeper and question him as to James' whereabouts. James recognizes Brooke from their initial appearance in town and captures her. While explaining to Brooke how he knows her father, James switches out the gang's money in the lockbox with newspaper and book pages, hiding the real money in his saddlebags. Colton eventually is forced to ride into town, surprising the guard and killing everyone in the gang except James, but is injured in the process.

James arranges a showdown wherein gang member Eustice (Clint Howard) will kill Brooke if Colton chooses to kill James, or James will release Colton if he kills Brooke himself. Colton asks Brooke to look after him, and shoots Eustice. James shoots Colton. Brooke runs over to her father as James gloats; she picks up her father's gun and kills James. As she lies with her father's body, Jarret arrives and agrees to testify that her father was a hero who found and killed his wife's murderers (as opposed to a vigilante outlaw who interfered with a US Marshal) in exchange for James' lockbox. Knowing the lockbox was changed out, Brooke agrees, then asks a barmaid to retrieve the saddlebags so she can go home.

== Cast ==
- Nicolas Cage as Colton Briggs
- Ryan Kiera Armstrong as Brooke Briggs
- Shiloh Fernandez as Boots
- Noah Le Gros as James McCallister
- Nick Searcy as Marshal Jarret
- Abraham Benrubi as Big Mike
- Clint Howard as Eustice
- Dean Armstrong as Clark
- Kerry Knuppe as Ruth Briggs
- Adam Lazarre-White as Greg
- Craig Branham as Arnie
- Beau Linnell as Mark
- Joe Pepper as Bubbie

== Production ==
In October 2021, the film's crew members complained about property key assistant and armorer Hannah Gutierrez-Reed's handling of firearms, including an incident in which she discharged a weapon without warning and caused lead actor Nicolas Cage to walk off set. Gutierrez-Reed, the stepdaughter of Thell Reed, would later work as armorer on the set of Rust, and she became a principal figure in the 2021 shooting incident that killed Halyna Hutchins and wounded director Joel Souza.

Filming occurred in Montana.

In January 2022, Saban Films acquired distribution rights to the film in North America, the UK, Ireland, Australia, New Zealand, South Africa, France, Germany, Austria, Switzerland, the Benelux, Scandinavia, and Spain.

== Release ==
The Old Way was released by Saban Films in limited theaters on January 6, 2023 and on January 13, 2023 through video on demand. Lionsgate released the film on Blu-ray Disc (plus digital), DVD, digital and on demand on February 21. Special features on Blu-ray and DVD include audio commentary by director Brett Donowho, audio commentary by composer Andrew Morgan Smith, a behind-the-scenes featurette, and scoring sessions.

=== Box office ===
As of July 6, 2023, The Old Way grossed $59,729 in Netherlands, United Kingdom, and Russia.

=== Critical reception ===
On the review aggregator website Rotten Tomatoes, 32% of 59 critics' reviews are positive, with an average rating of 5.1/10. The website's consensus reads: "Nicolas Cage's first Western may be a bit of a genre departure for the prolific actor, but in most respects, it's merely a return to his Old Way of picking up roles in disappointingly subpar projects." Metacritic, which uses a weighted average, assigned the film a score of 43 out of 100, based on 14 critics, indicating "mixed or average" reviews.
