= Bonanza City, New Mexico =

Ghost town and filming location in New Mexico

Coordinates: 35°32′34″N 106°5′49″W

Location of Bonanza City

Bonanza City is a ghost town, located 13 miles (21 km) southwest of Santa Fe in Santa Fe County, New Mexico, United States. The town was founded in 1880 as a mining town, following the discovery of gold and silver in the nearby Cerrillos Hills. It was abandoned sometime in the early 1900s. Later in the 20th century, The Bonanza Creek Movie Ranch, which contains a movie set depicting a late 19th century mining town, was built near the ruins of Bonanza City.

== Background ==
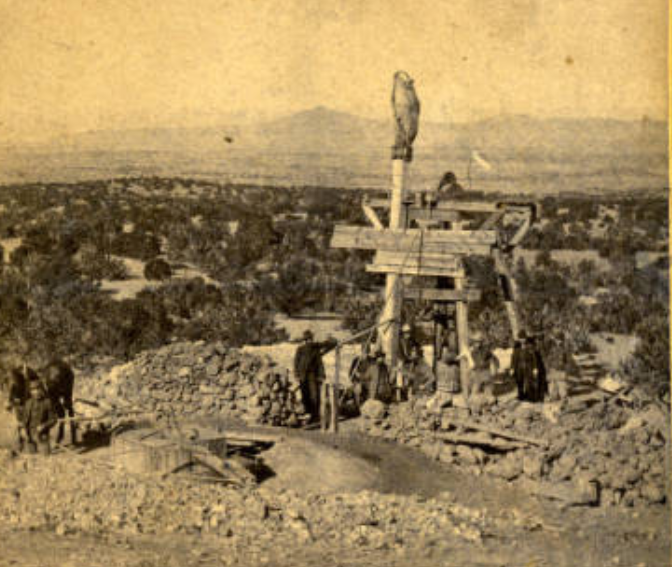
Miners in the Cerrillos Hills, circa 1890s

The Cerrillos Hills are a grouping of hills in modern-day New Mexico containing deposits of valuable resources including silver, gold, lead, copper, and turquoise. The Puebloans have mined for turquoise in the hills as early as the 900s CE. During the 16th and 17th centuries, the colonizing Spanish used Pueblo slave labor to mine turquoise, as well as lead and silver. In 1680, the Pueblo revolted against the Spanish and temporarily drove them from Santa Fe de Nuevo México (modern-day New Mexico); with the exception of a few sporadic mining operations, wide-scale mining would not occur again until the late 1800s. (Note: The Spanish reconquered the territory in 1692, and mined for lead to produce bullets. During the late 1700s, the Spanish started giving mining grants for land containing turquoise. During the 1800s, limited prospecting occurred in the region which resulted in the occasional discovery of gold.)

Ownership of the Cerrillos Hills region passed to Mexico in 1821 following the Mexican War of Independence and then to the United States in 1848 following the Mexican–American War. In May 1879, the administration of President Ulysses S. Grant began selling land in New Mexico, including the Cerrillos Hills region, to the American public. Later that year, two miners from Colorado discovered gold and silver deposits within the Cerrillos Hills, which led to a mining boom and the establishment of numerous mining towns around the Cerrillos Hills. In September 1879, the Los Cerrillos Mining District was established to regulate mining claims within the region. By the end of 1880, at least 500 mining shafts had been opened within the district.

== Original town ==
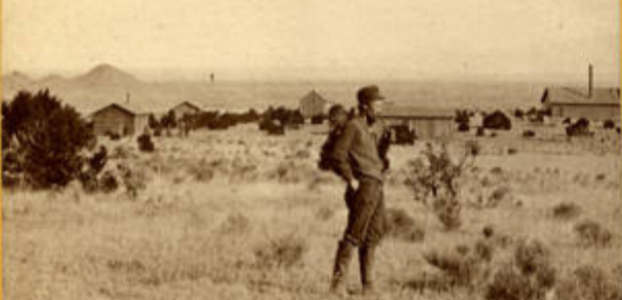
A possible photograph of Bonanza City during the early 1880s (Note: Secord & Milford claim that the image is of Bonanza City. The specific stenograph this image was copied from labeled the picture as the "Marshall Bonanza Property"; this was the name of a single-shaft mine located in the Los Cerrillos Mining District.)

Bonanza City was founded in 1880 by John Mahoney, the former US consul to Algiers. Bonanza is Spanish for "prosperity" or "rich ore-pocket"; Bonanza City was one of the many mining towns founded after the discovery of valuable minerals in the Los Cerrillos hills. By July 1881, the town contained a store, post office, hotel, and smelter; Bonanza City also had a church and priest at some point in the early 1880s. The town lacked important amenities such as a barbershop, shoemaker, and a general merchandise store. Bonanza City had a population of up to 2,000 people, presumably at some point from 1880 to 1883.

In 1883, the Bonanza City post office closed, while the smelter was transported to Albuquerque after Bonanza failed to provide enough ore. The population of Bonanza City dropped to 200 by 1884, although some demand for miners existed for another year or so. The town went into further decline following 1885 and was largely abandoned by 1890. Bonanza City experienced a temporary revival in the early 1900s after the construction of a small smelter, but was ultimately completely abandoned at some point in the early 20th century. (Note: Coverage from local newspapers indicates that the town was still populated during the 1900s and that the area was recognized as a town into at least the early 1910s.) Today, all that remains of the original town are building foundations and the ruins of the smelter.

== Use as a filming location ==
The Bonanza Creek Movie Ranch is located near the ruins of Bonanza City. (Note: Bonanza City was located immediately south of Alamo Creek (formerly the Los Cerrillos Creek) while the Bonanza Creek Movie Ranch is located immediately north of Alamo Creek. The Bonanza Creek Movie Ranch nonetheless maintains that the ranch is constructed on the ruins of Bonanza City. Both the television series Kid Nation and a TelevisionWeek article reviewing the series reiterate this claim.) The Hughes family obtained the ranch during the 1940s. The family has used the ranch as a filming location since the early 1950s, when scenes from The Man from Laramie were filmed there. Dozens of films, including Silverado, The Legend of the Lone Ranger, and A Million Ways to Die in the West, have since been filmed in part or entirely on the ranch. The 2007 television show Kid Nation, which aired for one season on CBS, was also filmed on the ranch. The series tasked 40 children, ranging in age from 8 to 15, with revitalizing a fictionalized version of Bonanza City and correcting the supposed mistakes of the city's original residents. The show proved controversial and faced claims of child exploitation.

The earliest films produced on the ranch either took place outdoors or used facades. Starting in the 1980s, a permanent movie set was constructed on the ranch by the Hughes family and various production companies. The set consists of complete, free-standing buildings that are supplied with water and electricity.

On October 21, 2021, the film Rust was in production in Bonanza when Alec Baldwin discharged a prop firearm on the set, killing cinematographer Halyna Hutchins and injuring director Joel Souza. The movie restarted production in January 2023 but not in New Mexico.

== See also ==
- List of ghost towns in New Mexico
