= Freedom's Path =

2022 American drama film

- Release poster
- Directed by: Brett Smith
- Screenplay by: Brett Smith
- Produced by: AJ Winslow; Jim Pidgeon; Neko Sparks; Steven Swadling; Brett Smith; Manish Majithia
- Starring: Gerran Howell; RJ Cyler; Ewen Bremner
- Cinematography: Chris Koser
- Edited by: Tomas Vengris
- Music by: Ryan Taubert
- Production companies: Rocket Soul Studios; 1812 Films; Soulidifly Productions; Rock Hill Studios; Room In The Sky Films; Chicago Media Angels
- Distributed by: Xenon Pictures
- Release dates: April 15, 2022 (Cinequest); February 3, 2023 (United States)
- Running time: 131 minutes
- Country: United States
- Language: English

Freedom's Path is a 2022 American historical war drama film written, directed and produced by Brett Smith in his feature length debut. It stars Gerran Howell, RJ Cyler, and Ewen Bremner. Based on the American Civil War, it won multiple film festival awards in 2022 and had a limited theatrical run from February 3, 2023.

== Synopsis ==
A Union soldier is rescued by a free Black man and his friends, who run a portion of the Underground Railroad. Meanwhile, a ruthless slave catcher is looking to bring them down.

== Cast ==
- Gerran Howell as William
- RJ Cyler as Kitch
- Ewen Bremner as Silas
- Harrison Gilbertson as Lewis
- Mia Tucker as Nora
- Carol Sutton as Caddy
- Afemo Omilami as Ellis Freeman
- Steven Swadling as Jake Nilsson
- Thomas Jefferson Byrd as Abner

== Production ==
The film is based on a short of the same name that Brett Smith released in 2015. The feature length film was produced by Rocket Soul Studios and 1812 Films, with Soulidifly Productions, Rock Hill Studios, Room In The Sky Films and Chicago Media Angels. Producers were AJ Winslow, Jim Pidgeon, Neko Sparks and Steven Swadling. The film has a promotional partnership with Allen Media Group.

=== Filming ===
Principal photography took place in October 2019. It was largely filmed in and around Fayetteville, Arkansas, with filming locations including Prairie Grove Battlefield Park, War Eagle Mill, Lincoln, and Cane Hill.

During filming, assistant director David Halls was fired after a firearm discharged unexpectedly on set, wounding a crew member. He would later work as assistant director on the set of Rust, and he became a principal character in the shooting incident that killed Halyna Hutchins and wounded director Joel Souza.

== Release ==
The film premiered at the Cinequest Film & Creativity Festival on April 15, 2022. The film was distributed by Xenon Pictures in 128 AMC and Regal Cinemas theaters on February 3, 2023 with part of ticket sales be donated to Historically Black Colleges and Universities.

== Reception ==
In September 2022 the film won the Director’s Choice award at the Gig Harbor Film Festival in Washington State. It also received the Audience Award at both the Cinequest San Jose Festival and Fayetteville Film Festival in 2022. It won the ‘Best of Fest’ award at the Lone Star Film Festival, along with the ‘Festival Award’ at the San Diego International Film Festival and the Special Jury Prize at the St. Louis International Film Festival, all also in 2022.
