= Prop gun =

Gun or replica used in film/TV/theatre

A prop gun is a gun or replica gun that is used primarily by movie and television productions or in theatre performances. As a prop, these guns can be divided into non-firing guns (replicas) and firing guns (firearms). Firearms are subject to restriction by law and safety regulations in use, due to their inherent danger, and illegal misuse by criminals.

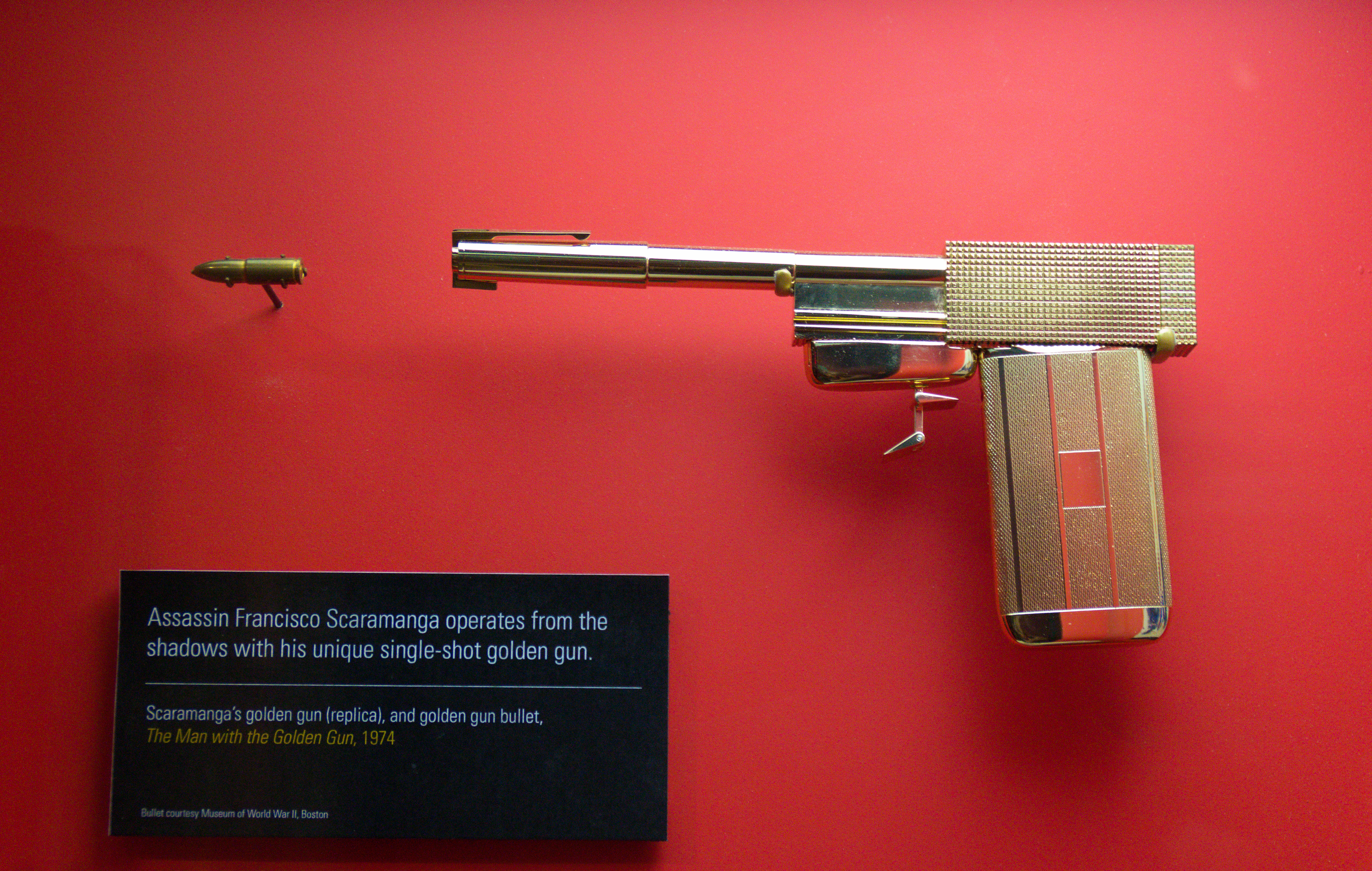
Scaramanga's Golden Gun (2010 Factory entertainment replica of the one used in the 1974 film)

== Replica guns ==
Stage replicas can be made from metal, resin, plastic, or rubber. They cannot fire or hold any type of round and typically they produce no noise or smoke effects, these can be added during the post-production process. Some replica guns are equipped with an electronically triggered muzzle flash.

== Firearms as props ==
Prop firearms are either real guns or specifically made to be blank firing only but can fire live ammunition by using a conversion kit.

Blank ammunition has a cartridge that when fired produces realistic effects such as noise, smoke, a muzzle flash and recoil; they contain gunpowder but do not have a bullet. To achieve a desired visual effect, the amount of gunpowder used may vary, sometimes using more than a regular live round.

Dummy rounds are replicas that may be used if the chambered bullets in the cylinder of a revolver are visible to the camera. They can be constructed from pre-used live rounds or be moulded from resin.

== Gun safety ==
In the interest of safety, the use of prop firearms is strictly regulated. Besides legal requirements, industry standards and guidelines have been set. The weapons master or armorer, a position that prior to the 1980s was handled by the prop master, is responsible for making sure these regulations are followed. The armorer may undertake the training of the actors and is present at the set while they are used. They are in charge of the loading, handling, preparation and testing of the firearm to be used as a prop.

Blanks expel gunpowder and hot gases out of the front of the barrel in a cone shape. This is harmless at longer ranges, but even without a projectile, the burning flame and debris from burned and unburned flakes of gunpowder create a very real hazard at close distances and can be lethal if the muzzle becomes blocked with debris.

If the gun is aimed towards the camera during filming extra precautions are taken to protect the film crew, such as perspex screening, eye protection or remote operation of the camera.

Computer-generated imagery (CGI) can produce effects that mimic the noise and smoke of a firing gun. This has increasingly replaced the use of prop guns with blanks as a safe alternative.

== Fatal prop gun incidents ==
- 1984, Jon-Erik Hexum, died of self-inflicted head trauma from a blank while playing Russian roulette in between sets of Cover Up.
- 1993, actor Brandon Lee, killed on set of the movie The Crow by the accidental discharge of a bullet that had been unknowingly stuck in the barrel and later pushed out by a blank.
- 2017, stuntman Johann Ofner, killed by the wad of a blank shotgun shell on set of the music video of "Friend Like You".
- 2021, cinematographer Halyna Hutchins, killed on set of the movie Rust by Alec Baldwin after he shot her with a live round that was supposed to be blank or a dummy round.

== See also ==
- Captive bolt pistol
- Squib load
- Starter pistol
