= Weapons master =

Person responsible for weapon care and safety on a film set

The weapons master, sometimes credited as the armorer, weapons specialist, weapons handler, weapons wrangler, or weapons coordinator, is a film crew specialist that works with the property master, director, actors, stunt coordinator and script supervisor. The weapons master is specifically responsible for maintaining control of any prop weapons, including firearms, knives, swords, bows, and staff weapons.

== Duties ==
In some areas the weapons master must be a licensed armourer when firearms are used as props.

As of 1993, when Brandon Lee was killed by a gun believed to be loaded with blanks, the rules of the Alliance of Motion Picture and Television Producers required:

- Someone certified for the weapon in use be present at all times
- Firearms must be checked before and after each take
- Firearms must be cleaned daily
- Firearms must be stored securely by the props master when not in use
- Loaded guns must never be pointed at anyone
- Protective clothing must be worn by everyone nearby when blanks are fired
- If firearms are to be fired directly at the camera, a plexiglass shield must be erected
- Only the person certified for the weapon or someone under their direct supervision may hand a weapon to an actor

As of 2021, when Halyna Hutchins was killed by a gun believed to be unloaded, the Industry-Wide Labor-Management Safety Committee's guidelines stressed that blanks can kill, that all firearms were to be treated as loaded and that "live" ammunition was never to be brought onto any set. According to Local 44, a union that represents props masters, no members were on set when the shooting occurred.

According to Mike Papac, an experienced weapons master, a firearm should not be handed to an actor until film is rolling and should be taken from the actor as soon as the director calls "cut" and there should "never, ever, ever [be] any live ammo on the set. Never. Under no circumstances". According to armorer Larry Zanoff, after the director calls "cut", "nobody moves until I gather up every gun and yell 'The weapons are cold.'"

The UK has stricter laws in relation to weapons on set, and the Metropolitan Police in co-ordination with the Health and Safety Executive (HSE) have published two information leaflets for film sets in relation to weapons and stunts ETIS17 and ETIS20

Some weapons masters (particularly in lower-budget productions) are also responsible for training the actors. Prior to the 1980s, weapons were frequently the responsibility of the property master or their assistant, but since then, it has become increasingly common in the industry for the property master to a hire a dedicated weapons master in order to reduce the burden on themselves. However, it is still common for the property master to double as the weapons master, as a cost-saving measure, on productions where National Firearms Act-regulated firearms (such as machine guns or sawed-off shotguns) are not being used.

== Prop weapons accidents ==
Charles Chandler, an extra on the set of The Captive (1915), was shot in the head and killed after another extra neglected to remove a live round from his rifle after a previous scene was shot with live rounds. Director Cecil DeMille in his autobiography wrote that he had told the extras to reload with blanks. Blanche Sweet said that DeMille's pursuit of realism had led to the use of live ammunition on set.

House Peters Sr. suffered serious burns to his face and hands when a prop pistol exploded upon being fired during shooting of The Girl of the Golden West (1915).

On the set of a publicity shoot for Haunted Spooks (1920), Harold Lloyd picked up what he thought was a prop bomb with the fuse lit and it detonated, blowing off the thumb and first finger of his right hand.

Director and actor Buster Keaton was knocked unconscious by a cannon firing, assistant director Harry Barnes was hit in the face by a blank charge, and several extras were injured by misfired muskets on the set of The General (1926).

On the set of They Died with Their Boots On (1941) extra Jack Budlong was killed when his horse tripped; as he fell forward, he threw his sword away, but it landed handle down and Budlong was impaled.

During the filming of the Unconquered (1947), nine extras suffered burns from flaming arrows.

On the set of The Alamo (1960), Laurence Harvey was injured when he was hit by a cannon recoiling after firing.

In 1984 Jon-Erik Hexum was killed on the set of Cover Up when he discharged a gun loaded with blanks against his skull.

While filming Cyborg (1989), Jackson "Rock" Pinckney lost his eye when Jean-Claude Van Damme accidentally struck him with a prop knife.

While filming Highlander II: The Quickening (1991), Michael Ironside inadvertently chopped off part of Christopher Lambert's finger during a sword-fight scene.

Linda Hamilton suffered permanent hearing damage in one ear when she fired a gun inside an elevator without using her ear plugs during filming of Terminator 2: Judgment Day (1991).

In 1993 Brandon Lee was killed on the set of The Crow when a prop weapon loaded with blanks with an object unknowingly stuck in the barrel was fired at him.

During filming of Time Team (2007), Paul Allen died after a splinter from a broken lance penetrated his eye socket.

While filming the final episode of Lost in 2010, Terry O'Quinn unknowingly stabbed Matthew Fox with a real knife instead of a collapsible one.

On the set of Fury (2014), a stuntman accidentally stabbed another stuntman with a bayonet during a rehearsal.

In 2021 Halyna Hutchins was killed and Joel Souza was injured on the set of Rust when Alec Baldwin fired a gun thought to be safe at the camera they were standing behind. Baldwin and armorer Hannah Gutierrez-Reed were charged with involuntary manslaughter in 2023.

== Notable weapons masters ==
In the US many weapons masters are members of the American Entertainment Armorers Association in the United Kingdom they should be Registered Firearm Dealers or agents thereof.

- Mike Gibbons
- Gary Harper
- Michael Papac
- Thell Reed
- James, Ed, and Syd Stembridge of Stembridge Gun Rentals, founded approximately 1920
- Mike Tristano
- Gary Darling-Parkes
- Rick Washburn

== See also ==
- Stembridge Gun Rentals, a major supplier of prop firearms to the US movie and television industry from 1920 to 2007
- Independent Studio Services, a supplier of prop weapons
- List of film and television accidents
