= Rust shooting incident =

2021 manslaughter on a film set

- Date: October 21, 2021; 5 years ago
- Time: c. 1:46 p.m. (Mountain Time)
- Location: Bonanza City, New Mexico U.S.; 35°32′36″N 106°05′52″W
- Type: Accidental fatal shooting, manslaughter
- Deaths: Halyna Hutchins
- Injuries: Joel Souza
- Accused: Alec Baldwin
- Convicted: David Halls; Hannah Gutierrez-Reed
- Charges: Baldwin: Involuntary manslaughter
- Trial: Gutierrez-Reed's trial ran from February 21 – March 6, 2024; Baldwin's trial ran July 9–12, 2024
- Verdict: Halls: Pleaded no contest Gutierrez-Reed: Guilty of manslaughter, not guilty of tampering with evidence Baldwin: Charges dismissed with prejudice by trial judge
- Convictions: Halls: Negligent use of a deadly weapon Gutierrez-Reed: Involuntary manslaughter
- Sentence: Halls: 6 months probation Gutierrez-Reed: 18 months in prison

On October 21, 2021, at the Bonanza Creek Ranch in Bonanza City, New Mexico, United States, cinematographer Halyna Hutchins was fatally shot and director Joel Souza was injured on the set of the film Rust when a live round was discharged from a revolver that actor Alec Baldwin was using as a prop.

The incident was investigated by the Santa Fe County Sheriff's Office, the New Mexico First Judicial District Attorney, the New Mexico Occupational Health and Safety Bureau, and the Federal Bureau of Investigation. In an affidavit, the Santa Fe County Sheriff's Office stated that neither Baldwin nor first assistant director David Halls knew that the gun in question was loaded. On January 31, 2023, the Santa Fe district attorney charged Baldwin and armorer Hannah Gutierrez-Reed with one count each of involuntary manslaughter. Halls agreed to plead guilty to the charge of the negligent use of a deadly weapon.

On February 23, 2023, Baldwin pleaded not guilty, and on April 20, it was reported that prosecutors had indicated that the charges against him were being dropped. Gutierrez-Reed was later charged with tampering with evidence. On March 6, 2024, Gutierrez-Reed was found guilty of involuntary manslaughter but was acquitted on the evidence tampering charge. Gutierrez-Reed was then remanded into police custody and sentenced to 18 months in prison on April 15, 2024; she was released on May 23, 2025. On January 19, 2024, Baldwin was again indicted on charges of involuntary manslaughter; he pleaded not guilty. Baldwin's trial began on July 9, 2024, but the charges were dismissed with prejudice three days later over a Brady disclosure violation. The judge found that authorities, in an "intentional and deliberate" manner, withheld evidence from the defense regarding a set of bullets, and that this displayed "signs of scorching prejudice".

The film was eventually released in U.S. theaters in 2025. The incident prompted debates over the use of real guns as props, as well as safety and working conditions on film sets.

== Background ==
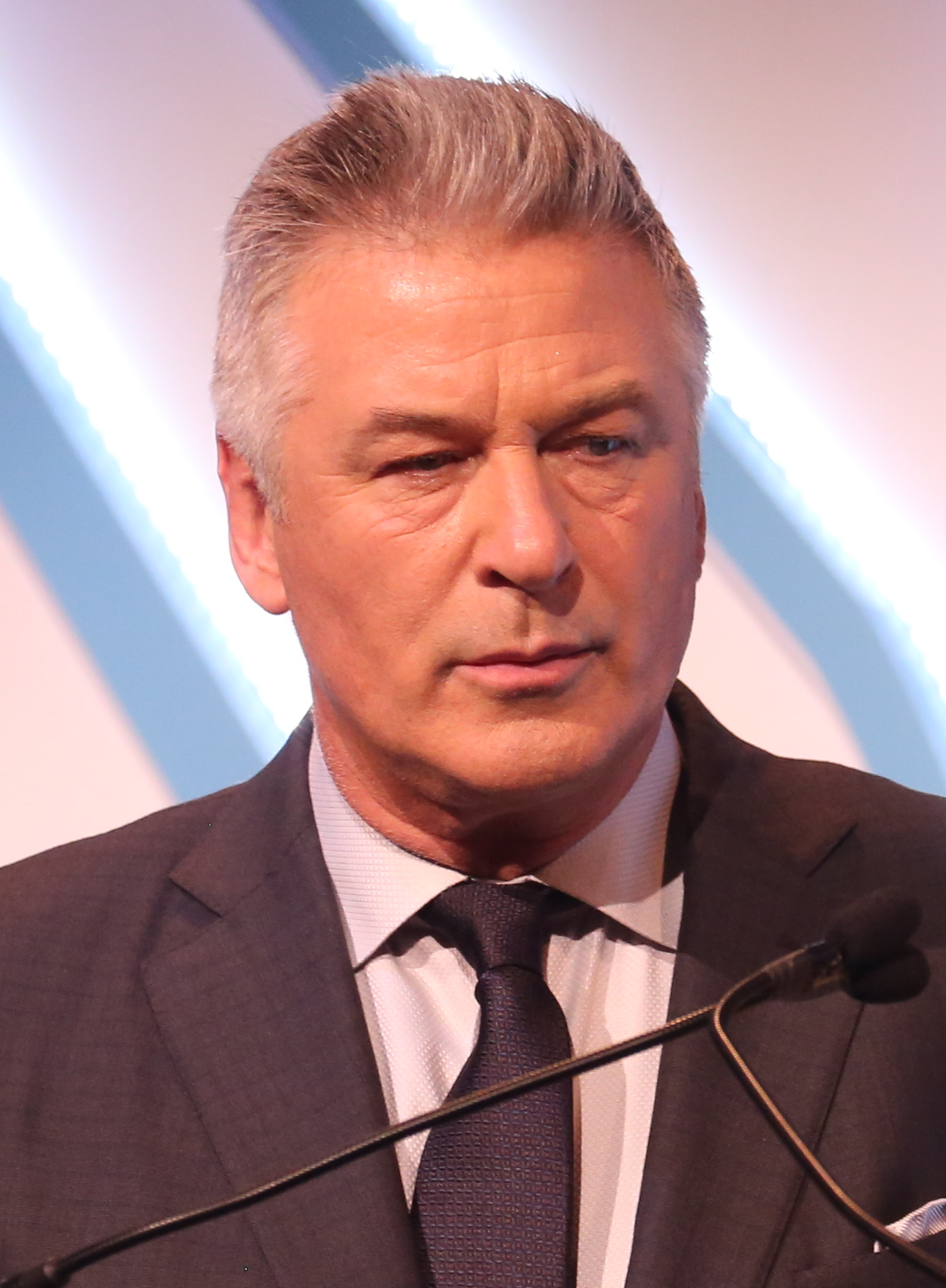
Actor and Rust producer Alec Baldwin

The story for Rust was conceived by writer-director Joel Souza and actor-director Alec Baldwin. The Western was produced on a budget of $6–7 million, and its distribution rights were sold for $2 million during pre-production. The production had a filming schedule of 21 days. Principal photography began on October 6, 2021, at the Bonanza Creek Ranch in Bonanza City, New Mexico, a ghost town approximately 13 miles (21km) south of Santa Fe.

Responsible for overseeing all weapons on set was the production's property key assistant and armorer, Hannah Gutierrez-Reed, stepdaughter of long-time industry armorer Thell Reed. Rust was Gutierrez-Reed's second film serving as lead armorer. On her first film, The Old Way, several crew members complained about her handling of firearms, including an incident in which she discharged a weapon without warning and caused lead actor Nicolas Cage to walk off set.

David Halls was the assistant director. In the aftermath of the incident, former colleagues reported that Halls faced complaints in 2019 about his behavior during the filming of two episodes of Into the Dark; the complaints indicated that he allegedly disregarded safety protocols by ignoring blocked exits and a fire lane. In the same year, Halls had been fired from working on the film Freedom's Path after a firearm discharged unexpectedly on set, wounding a crew member.

On the set of the independent film One Way, a crew member warned producers about Halls's disregard for safety measures and said, "That man is a liability. He's going to fucking kill someone someday, and you're going to be responsible." However, the film's digital imaging technician disputes this claim, saying he knew Halls to be conscientious about safety. The Hollywood Reporter reported a number of complaints raised during the production of 2019's The Tiger Rising, which also featured Rust executive producers Ryan Donnell Smith, Allen Cheney, Emily Hunter Salveson, and Ryan Winterstern.

=== Union disputes and safety complaints ===
The beginning of Rust's production came amidst a potential strike by members of the International Alliance of Theatrical Stage Employees (IATSE) over working conditions and low pay. On October 4, it was announced that IATSE members voted 98.68% in favor of authorizing a strike, with a voter turnout of 89.66% of eligible voters. Cinematographer Halyna Hutchins supported IATSE. She wrote in an Instagram post: "Standing in #IAsolidarity with our @IATSE crew here in New Mexico on RUST."

Some crew members claim firearms safety protocols were not distributed with the call sheets and were not strictly followed on the set. They claim there was no medic present during the construction of the film's sets. Crew members grew upset with what they claimed was a lack of adequate hotel rooms. Crew members alleged producers would only allow the local New Mexico crew courtesy room rentals after working 13 hours "on the clock". Some claimed they were only left with six hours to sleep after long drives home. However, a source close to the production said their union contract indicated a hotel would be provided if the travel distance was more than 60 miles (100 km) and that producers would provide a hotel for crew after 13.5 hours or more on set. The source also claimed that hotels were provided to crew on days they worked 10–12 hours if call time was before 6 a.m. and production wrapped after 7 p.m.

It has been reported that some crew members believe they were mocked for wanting to avoid a one-hour drive from Albuquerque. Several crew members also claimed that they were not being paid on time. A crew member added, "We cited everything from lack of payment for three weeks, taking our hotels away despite asking for them in our deals, lack of COVID-19 safety, and on top of that, poor gun safety! Poor on-set safety period!" Before the incident occurred, two prop guns had previously fired a total of three times unintentionally. Baldwin's stunt double had accidentally fired two blanks when he was told a prop gun was "cold", and the film's prop master shot herself in the foot with a blank round.

In a letter signed by 25 crew members, these claims were disputed. In the letter, the crew writes that they "believe the public narrative surrounding our workplace tragedy to be inadequate and wish to express a more accurate account of our experience". The letter added that "The descriptions of Rust as a chaotic, dangerous and exploitative workplace are false and distract from what matters the most: the memory of (DP) Halyna Hutchins, and the need to find modern alternatives to outdated industry firearm and safety practices." The letter went on to state the following:

"Unfortunately, in the film industry, it is common to work on unprofessional or hectic productions to gain experience and credits. Many of us have worked on those types of productions. Rust was not one of them. Rust was professional. We do acknowledge that no set is perfect, and like any production, Rust had areas of brilliance and areas that were more challenging. While we stand firmly with our unions and strongly support the fight for better working conditions across our industry, we do not feel that this set was a representation of the kind of conditions our unions are fighting against."

Many of the IATSE union rules regarding firearms handling are similar to those of other unions supporting actors, including the Actors Equity and Screen Actors Guild, which cover stage and screen actors respectively.

== Events of October 21 ==
=== Preparations for the rehearsal ===
On the morning of October 21, 2021, which was to be the twelfth day of filming, seven unionized members of the film's camera crew began collecting their belongings at approximately 6:30 a.m. MT in a walkout. They claim they were told to leave the set, with a producer threatening to call the police, and were replaced with nonunion crew members. According to a statement given to TheWrap by an anonymous insider, several crew members took a number of prop guns off-set that day, including the firearm involved in the incident, to pass the time shooting at beer cans with live ammunition. After a lunch break, the prop guns had been returned. It is not clear if the firearms were checked again. On October 26, the Santa Fe County district attorney said these claims were still unconfirmed.

Later that day, the cast and crew were rehearsing a gunfight scene taking place inside of a church at the Bonanza Creek Ranch. Firearms and ammunition were retrieved from a locked safe and armorer Hannah Gutierrez-Reed placed three guns to be used in filming on a cart. Among them were a plastic gun that could not shoot live ammunition, a modified weapon that could not fire any type of ammunition, and a solid-frame .45 Colt revolver replica made by Pietta.

According to a search warrant, the guns were briefly checked by Gutierrez-Reed, before assistant director David Halls took the Pietta revolver from the prop cart and handed it to Baldwin. In a subsequent affidavit, Halls said the safety protocol regarding this firearm was such that Halls would open the loading gate of the revolver and rotate the cylinder to expose the chambers so he could inspect them himself. According to the affidavit, Halls said he did not check all cylinder chambers, but he recalled seeing three rounds in the cylinder at the time. After the shooting, Halls said in the affidavit, Gutierrez-Reed retrieved the weapon and opened it, and Halls said that he saw four rounds which were plainly blanks, and one which could have been the remaining shell of a discharged live round. In the warrant, it is further stated that Halls announced the term "cold gun", meaning that it did not contain live rounds. Halls's lawyer, Lisa Torraco, later sought to assert that he did not take the gun off the cart and hand it to Baldwin as reported, but when pressed by a reporter to be clear, she refused to repeat that assertion.

=== Rehearsal and shooting incident ===
B-camera operator Reid Russell was situated on a camera dolly, looking at a monitor with Hutchins and Souza both nearby. The scene involved Baldwin's character removing a gun from its holster and pointing it toward the camera. The trio behind the monitor were two feet (0.6 m) from the muzzle of the firearm and none of them were wearing protective gear such as noise-canceling headphones or safety goggles.

The trio behind the monitor began repositioning the camera to remove a shadow, and Baldwin began explaining to the crew how he planned to draw the firearm. He said, "So, I guess I'm gonna take this out, pull it, and go, 'Bang!'" He removed it from the holster, and the revolver discharged a single time. Baldwin denied pulling the trigger of the gun, while ABC News described a later FBI report stating that the gun could only fire if the trigger was pulled. Halls was quoted by his attorney Lisa Torraco as saying that Baldwin did not pull the trigger, and that Baldwin's finger was never within the trigger guard during the incident. When the gun fired, the projectile traveled towards the three behind the monitor. It struck Hutchins in the chest, traveled through her body, and then hit Souza in the shoulder. Script supervisor Mamie Mitchell called 911 at 1:46 p.m. MT and emergency crews appeared three minutes later. Footage of the incident was not recorded.

Hutchins was flown by helicopter to the University of New Mexico Hospital in Albuquerque, where she was pronounced dead. Souza was treated by EMS and transported by ambulance to Christus St. Vincent Regional Medical Center in Santa Fe, where he was admitted and released by the following morning.

As a result of the incident, production on Rust was suspended indefinitely, though co-producer Anjul Nigam was confident the film would resume production once the investigation ended. However, Nigam later clarified that he meant to express optimism and hope, rather than confidence, as he stated that many involved in the production hope to honor Hutchins by completing her final work.

== Criminal charges ==
=== Investigation ===
On October 21, the Santa Fe County Sheriff's Office said it was investigating "what type of projectile was discharged" and how the event occurred. Baldwin was questioned and left without charges filed.

On October 22, Baldwin sent out a tweet expressing his shock and sadness. He also indicated his full cooperation in the ongoing police investigation regarding the incident:

"There are no words to convey my shock and sadness regarding the tragic accident that took the life of Halyna Hutchins, a wife, mother and deeply admired colleague of ours. I'm fully cooperating with the police investigation to address how this tragedy occurred and I am in touch with her husband, offering my support to him and his family. My heart is broken for her husband, their son, and all who knew and loved Halyna."

The Sheriff's Office confirmed the cooperation. On October 22, the Santa Fe County Magistrate issued two search warrants. In an affidavit, the Sheriff's Office said neither Halls nor Baldwin knew the gun was loaded. On October 27, after issuing another search warrant, the department said they had recovered over 600 items as evidence, including 500 rounds of ammunition which were a mix of blanks, dummy rounds and suspected live rounds. They added that a projectile had been recovered from Souza's shoulder, which they categorized as a suspected live round.

The incident was also under investigation by the state's First Judicial District Attorney, as well as the New Mexico Occupational Health and Safety Bureau, and the Federal Bureau of Investigation. The film's production company, Rust Movie Productions, was conducting an internal review. On October 26, the film's producers said they had hired a legal team from Jenner & Block to conduct an investigation and interview the cast and crew about the incident. On the same day, women's rights attorney Gloria Allred and her law firm Allred, Maroko & Goldberg were confirmed to be investigating the incident and representing Rust script supervisor Mamie Mitchell. On October 28, Halls hired Albuquerque attorney Lisa Torraco as his defense lawyer; Gutierrez-Reed hired former Assistant U.S. Attorney Jason Bowles as her lawyer.

On November 3, Bowles gave a television interview in which he suggested that the incident was the result of "sabotage". Without naming any individuals, Bowles cited the walkout of the camera crew earlier on October 21, calling the crew "disgruntled" and implying that one of them may have been motivated to "tamper with this scene" by placing a live round in the chamber of the Pietta revolver. On November 10, Santa Fe County District Attorney Mary Carmack-Altwies said "we do not have any proof" of sabotage and added, "The defense attorneys, we don't have the same information that they do, but until we have it in our hands, it doesn't play into the decision making process." That same day, Bowles continued to spread his theory and said his team "are convinced that this was sabotage and Hannah is being framed." In December 2021, Gutierrez-Reed's father Thell Reed said there was "a lot of motive" for the incident to be sabotage.

On December 2, 2021, ABC television host George Stephanopoulos interviewed Baldwin. On December 6, Baldwin deleted his Twitter account. On December 16, it was reported that Santa Fe police had obtained a search warrant for Baldwin's mobile phone, which was handed over on January 14, 2022.

In August 2022, FBI forensic testing and investigation of the firearm determined the Pietta .45 Long Colt Single Action Army revolver could not have been fired without a trigger pull from a quarter cocked, half-cocked, or fully cocked hammer position. It was also determined that the internal components of the revolver were intact and functional which ruled out mechanical failure as a reason for an accidental discharge. Baldwin stated during a December 2021 interview for ABC News that "the trigger wasn't pulled" and "I didn't pull the trigger."

In August 2023, a second analysis of the Pietta from a firearms expert concluded that the revolver could only have been fired by a pull of the trigger. The report also stated that the gun was reconstructed after it was broken during earlier testing by the FBI and was later "found to function properly and in accordance with the operational design of original Colt 1873 single-action revolvers."

=== Prosecution ===
On April 20, 2022, the state of New Mexico's Occupational Health and Safety Bureau fined Rust Movie Productions $136,793 (USD) for firearms safety failures after it was confirmed that David Halls, an assistant director and safety coordinator, handed a large-caliber revolver to Alec Baldwin without consulting with on-set weapons specialists prior to or after the gun was loaded. Regulators note that Halls had previously witnessed two other accidental discharges of rifles on set, but he took no investigative, corrective or disciplinary action. In February 2023, the producers agreed to pay a reduced penalty of $100,000 to resolve the OSHA case with the New Mexico Occupational Health and Safety Bureau.

On January 19, 2023, New Mexico First Judicial District Attorney Mary Carmack-Altwies said she would charge Baldwin and Gutierrez-Reed with one count each of involuntary manslaughter. Halls signed a plea agreement for the charge of negligent use of a deadly weapon.

Carmack-Altwies hired Andrea Reeb as a special prosecutor for the case. Carmack-Altwies said that she would be handling the case in conjunction with Reeb. On March 14, 2023, Reeb announced her resignation. On March 29, after a New Mexico judge denied Carmack-Altwies' request to bring on a new special prosecutor and serve as co-counsel, the Santa Fe district attorney also stepped aside and appointed a pair of veteran New Mexico attorneys Kari Morrissey and Jason Lewis as special prosecutors to take over the high-profile case. In April 2024, Lewis withdrew from the case and attorney Erlinda Johnson was appointed as a special prosecutor. She resigned just before the charges against Baldwin were dismissed.

On January 31, 2023, Alec Baldwin and Hannah Gutierrez-Reed were officially charged with involuntary manslaughter for the fatal shooting. One of Baldwin's attorneys was John Bash. However, after Baldwin's lawyers argued that he was incorrectly being charged under a version of the law that was not passed until months after the shooting, the prosecutors downgraded the charges. Thereafter, Baldwin and Gutierrez-Reed faced a maximum of 18 months in prison if found guilty. On February 23, Baldwin pleaded not guilty. It was also reported that he could still work, but also accepted pre-trial conditions which include a prohibition on consuming alcohol and not having possession of weapons, including firearms.

On March 31, 2023, Halls pleaded no contest to a misdemeanor charge of negligent use of a deadly weapon and was sentenced to six months of unsupervised probation, a $500 fine and 24 hours of community service.

On April 20, 2023, lawyers for Baldwin announced that the criminal charges against him had been dropped by prosecutors. In a statement, Baldwin's attorneys said "We are pleased with the decision to dismiss the case against Alec Baldwin and we encourage a proper investigation into the facts and circumstances of this tragic accident." A lawyer for Gutierrez-Reed said they were aware of the charges on Baldwin being dropped, but the charges against Gutierrez-Reed remained. Investigations into the shooting continued; according to the special prosecutors in the case, charges against Baldwin "may be re-filed".

On June 22, 2023, Gutierrez-Reed faced a second charge of tampering with evidence, in which the special prosecutors allege that she transferred "narcotics to another person with the intent to prevent the apprehension, prosecution or conviction of herself." They later specify from a June 29 court filing that she attempted to conceal a small bag of cocaine the night of the fatal shooting after her initial police interview. On August 4, 2023, Gutierrez-Reed waived her right to a preliminary hearing to determine whether or not the criminal charges would stand, thus allowing the trial to move forward and on August 9, she pleaded not guilty to both charges. On August 21, a New Mexico judge scheduled her trial to run February 21 through March 6, 2024.

On October 17, 2023, six months after felony charges were dropped against Baldwin, prosecutors announced their intent to ask a grand jury to determine whether he should again be criminally charged in the death of Halyna Hutchins. On January 19, 2024, exactly one year to the day involuntary manslaughter charges were first announced against Baldwin, he was indicted again on the said charge in Hutchins's death. On January 31, he pleaded not guilty and under the conditions of release, Baldwin was barred from possessing any firearms, consuming alcohol, leaving the country or coming into contact with anyone who may testify in the case. On February 26, a judge scheduled his trial to run July 9 through July 19, 2024.

On March 6, 2024, after a jury deliberated for about two hours, Gutierrez-Reed was found guilty on the charge of involuntary manslaughter but acquitted of tampering with evidence. Almost immediately after the verdict was read, she was remanded into custody until her sentencing hearing set for April 15, 2024. On March 29, a judge denied a motion from her lawyers for a new trial. On April 15, 2024, Gutierrez-Reed was sentenced to 18 months in prison. She was released on May 23, 2025 after completing her sentence. Under the conditions of parole, Gutierrez-Reed is barred from contacting any member of Hutchins's family and owning firearms, and required to undergo a mental health assessment, meet regularly with a parole officer and agree to electronic monitoring.

On May 24, 2024, Sante Fe-based Judge Mary Marlowe Sommer denied a motion which was filed by Baldwin to dismiss his trial, thus clearing the way to move forward. The trial began on July 9, 2024. On the first day, 12 jurors and 4 alternative jurors were selected. On July 10, opening statements got underway, with the prosecution arguing that the gun assigned to Baldwin when the shooting took place "worked perfectly fine" and that Baldwin didn't do a gun safety check with the "inexperienced" armorer and pulled the trigger "in reckless disregard for Miss Hutchins's safety."

On the evening of July 11, 2024, Baldwin's lawyers filed a motion to dismiss the case over allegations prosecutors hid evidence regarding the source of the bullets loaded into the gun. A set of bullets had been submitted to the authorities, with the witness claiming the bullets were related to the Rust case, but the bullets were filed under a different case number and the defense were not informed of them. The next day on July 12, Judge Mary Marlowe Sommer dismissed the case with prejudice over a Brady disclosure violation. Judge Sommer found that the authorities had "unilaterally withheld the supplemental report [regarding the bullets]. Santa Fe County Sheriff's officer made the decision — and apparently also with the prosecutor [...] that the evidence was of no evidentiary value and failed to connect the evidence to the case." Sommer further opined that the authorities' "willful withholding of this information was intentional and deliberate. If this conduct does not rise to the level of bad faith, it certainly comes so near to bad faith as to show signs of scorching prejudice".

On September 4, 2024, the prosecutor filed an appeal to overturn the decision which dismissed the case with prejudice. On September 5, the judge denied the prosecutor's bid to revive the manslaughter charge due to the motion exceeding ten pages; a revised motion was promptly submitted by the afternoon of September 6 which met the page limit. On September 26, a motion for Gutierrez-Reed's case to be retried or dismissed on the same basis as the dismissal of Baldwin's manslaughter charge was heard; the motion was denied on September 30, with Judge Sommer ruling that Gutierrez-Reed's defense had failed to establish that any suppressed evidence would have produced a different verdict. A motion for Gutierrez-Reed's immediate release from prison was also denied with Sommer saying that Gutierrez-Reed's defense had not established that she was unlikely to "flee or pose a danger to the safety of any other person or the community if released". On October 25, Judge Sommer again upheld her dismissal of the involuntary manslaughter charge against Baldwin, ruling that the prosecution failed to raise any factual or legal arguments which would have justified reversing her decision. On December 23, the prosecutor withdrew her second appeal of the judge's order dismissing the case after the state attorney general's office said it "did not intend to exhaustively pursue the appeal on behalf of the prosecution", officially bringing Baldwin's manslaughter case to an end.

== Civil lawsuits ==
On November 10, 2021, Rust gaffer Serge Svetnoy filed a lawsuit against the production for general negligence, and on April 29, 2023, added assault, intentional infliction of emotional distress to the lawsuit. On April 17, 2026, a judge ordered Baldwin to face a civil trial on whether he negligently fired a gun, which is set for October 12, 2026, but dismissed Svetnoy's claim for assault, finding no evidence that Baldwin intended to harm anyone.

A second lawsuit was filed on November 17, 2021, by script supervisor Mamie Mitchell, who says the script did not call for the discharging of a firearm. On January 23, 2022, Baldwin and other producers filed a memorandum that asked a California judge to dismiss the lawsuit. In November 2022, the court rejected a request to dismiss Mitchell's lawsuit against Baldwin and his production company and in March 2023, the judge paused her civil case until February 2024. The lawsuit was dismissed on April 2, 2024.

On January 12, 2022, Gutierrez-Reed filed a lawsuit against armorer Seth Kenney and his company PDQ Arm and Prop for allegedly bringing the live rounds on set in a box of ammunition that she alleged arrived the day of the shooting.

On February 15, 2022, after nearly three months of legal preparation, Hutchins's husband Matthew and son Andros filed a wrongful death suit which named Baldwin, Halls, Gutierrez-Reed, prop master Sarah Zachry, and others as defendants and sought unspecified damages. In October 2022, the Hutchins family settled the lawsuit.

On February 7, 2022, Rust key medic Cherlyn Schaefer filed a lawsuit against the production and several crew members for negligence. The lawsuit was partially settled on May 8, 2023 for $1.15 million from prop master Sarah Zachry.

On February 9, 2023, Hutchins's parents and sister filed a lawsuit against Baldwin and the production for negligence. This lawsuit was dismissed on June 13, 2024.

On February 27, 2023, three former crew members, Ross Addiego, Doran Curtin and Reese Price, also filed a lawsuit against Baldwin and the production for negligence. The lawsuit was settled in June 2025.

On June 5, 2024, Hutchins's family and former script supervisor Mamie Mitchell filed a new negligence lawsuit against Baldwin and the production in Santa Fe, New Mexico after their original suits were withdrawn in Los Angeles Superior Court. Shortly after the criminal case against Baldwin was dismissed on July 12, 2024, lawyers for Hutchins's widower and parents vowed to continue civil litigation against the actor. On March 3, 2025, lawyers for Hutchins's parents and sister filed a notice of deposition against Baldwin for his role in Hutchins's death.

On January 9, 2025, Baldwin filed a civil rights lawsuit against the district attorney and other officials in Santa Fe, New Mexico alleging wrongful prosecution for manslaughter in the death of Hutchins. The lawsuit was dismissed on July 30, 2025, but Baldwin filed a motion to reinstate in September 2025, which was accepted the following month, and on October 21, 2025, the defendants filed to move the case from state to federal court.

On October 22, 2025, Rust prop supplier Seth Kenney filed a lawsuit against Baldwin and the production alleging defamation in the wake of Hutchins's death.

== Future of the film ==
On October 15, 2022, it was announced that filming was set to resume in January 2023, in California, with Matthew Hutchins as an executive producer. Many of the film's crew gave mixed reactions towards the news, with some supporting it and planning on resuming their work on it, while others condemned the decision and decided to not return.

To get the permit to film, New Mexico requires at least a $1 million insurance policy. The production company had that in addition to a commercial umbrella policy for another $5 million, issued by Front Row Insurance Brokers. However, the insurance company may not pay if the accident is shown to be due to negligence and/or if there were certain exclusions in the policy wording of the insurance policy.

The film was eventually released in U.S. theaters on May 2, 2025. On its opening day, it received a low box office of $25,000 from 115 theaters, with the shooting incident being partially blamed for this low performance. The same day, it was released on video-on-demand streaming.

== Reactions ==
The International Cinematographers Guild announced it would hold a candlelight vigil on the evenings of October 23 and 24 for Hutchins. The Guild additionally set up a GoFundMe fundraiser for Hutchins's family. The American Film Institute (AFI) announced that it would set up a scholarship program for women cinematographers in Hutchins's name. On October 24, a vigil took place in New Mexico to mourn Hutchins's death. Industry professionals, including a number of Hollywood actors, were among those who attended the event in Albuquerque. Some attendees also called for better safety measures to be taken on film sets.

On October 29, Gutierrez-Reed released a statement saying that "the whole production set became unsafe" due to several factors that included a lack of safety meetings and her having to work two positions, preventing her from focusing full-time on her position as armorer. The statement also said that she "fought for training, days to maintain weapons, and proper time to prepare for gunfire but ultimately was overruled by production and her department", and that she had no idea where the live rounds came from. On November 1, Halls released a statement to the New York Post in which he paid his respects to Hutchins and said he hoped the incident would cause "the industry to reevaluate its values and practices to ensure no one is harmed through the creative process again".

=== Prop gun debate ===
The shooting sparked debates about the use of guns as props on film sets. Shannon Lee, whose brother, Brandon Lee, was killed by a similar accidental shooting from a prop firearm on the film set of The Crow in 1993, called for mandatory gun safety training and a reduction of the use of firearms as props, stating that "with all the special effects that are possible and all of the technology, there is no reason to have a prop gun or a gun on a set that can fire a projectile of any sort". Similar comments were echoed by others who knew Lee or had worked with him on The Crow. This led director Rupert Sanders, who directed the 2024 film adaptation of The Crow starring Bill Skarsgård, to ban all real guns from his set and use Airsoft guns instead, deeming the cost "worth it" as long as it ensured the safety and comfort of his cast and crew. Bill Dill, a cinematographer who was a teacher for Hutchins at the AFI, also suggested using special effects instead, calling it "archaic" that "real guns with blanks in them" are used in film. On October 22, The Rookie showrunner Alexi Hawley announced that the show would ban live guns from set, stating that "it is now policy on The Rookie that all gunfire on set will be Airsoft guns with CGI muzzle flashes added in post."

Firearms safety expert Dave Brown disputed the need to use only fake or toy guns in future film productions. In an article for CNN, he wrote that incidents such as this one "are the result not of including firearms on a film set but of a cavalier attitude towards safety" and "[w]hen handled responsibly, firearms are as safe as any other prop on a film set." He explained that, "On a safe production, each firearm is meticulously inspected every time it changes hands. It means every take of every angle of every scene; the same prop gun could be checked and re-checked dozens upon dozens of times in a single day. Live ammunition, without question, is never allowed on set."

The shooting sparked debates about the use of guns in films and television more generally. In an article for The Conversation, Brad Bushman of Ohio State University and Dan Romer of the University of Pennsylvania argued that "the gun industry pays production companies to place its products in their movies. They are rewarded with frequent appearances on screen," and that "the more guns there are in movies, the more likely it is that a shooting will occur – both in the 'reel' world and in the 'real' world." An editorial for the Los Angeles Times said the incident "raises the bigger issue of the proliferation of guns in shows and movies. Weapons are often part of plot points but do they need to be? TV and movie cops brandish and fire their weapons often, but in reality, a police officer rarely draws his or her gun (outside of a shooting range) in the course of an entire career."

=== Occupational safety criticism ===
The shooting also sparked debates about working conditions on film sets. In a speech at a vigil, IATSE vice-president Michael Miller said, "I'm afraid we are also gathered with some frustration and a little bit of anger. Anger that too often the rush to complete productions and the cutting of corners puts safety on the back burner and puts crew members at risk." In a Facebook post, the gaffer on the film set, Serge Svetnoy, said that "to save a dime sometimes [producers] hire people who are not fully qualified for the complicated and dangerous job."

== See also ==
- List of film and television accidents
  - The Captive, a 1915 film that used live ammunition during filming, resulting in the accidental shooting death of an extra
  - Twilight Zone accident, a 1982 helicopter crash that caused the death of actor Vic Morrow and two child actors
  - Death of Jon-Erik Hexum, a 1984 accident with a gun being used as a prop during the filming of Cover Up, involving a self-inflicted blank cartridge gunshot to the head
  - The Late, Late Breakfast Show: In 1986, Michael Lush died in a rehearsal for this British variety show during a bungee jump
  - Death of Brandon Lee, a 1993 accident with a gun being used as a prop during the filming of The Crow, involving a propelled squib load
- Safety for Sarah movement, a campaign created after camera assistant Sarah Jones was struck and killed by a train during the filming of Midnight Rider on February 20, 2014 in Wayne County, Georgia.
