= Last Take: Rust and the Story of Halyna =

2025 American documentary film

- Official poster
- Directed by: Rachel Mason
- Produced by: Rachel Mason; Julee Metz; Kate Barry; Jon Bardin; Will Cohen; Jessica Grimshaw; Nick Shumaker; Jennifer Sears
- Cinematography: Halyna Hutchins; Craig Boydston; Oliver Lukacs; Michael Pessah; Olesia Saveleva; Serge Svetnoy; Corey Weintraub; Dennis Zanatta; Daniel Zollinger
- Edited by: Krystalline Armendariz; Stacy Goldate
- Music by: Chanell Crichlow
- Production companies: Story Syndicate; Anonymous Content; Concordia Studio; FutureClown Productions
- Distributed by: Hulu
- Release date: March 11, 2025 (United States)
- Running time: 90 minutes
- Country: United States
- Language: English

Last Take: Rust and the Story of Halyna is a 2025 American documentary film, directed and produced by Rachel Mason. It follows the life, career, and death of cinematographer Halyna Hutchins.

It was released on March 11, 2025, by Hulu.

== Premise ==
Explores the life and career of cinematographer Halyna Hutchins, and her death on the set of Rust. Additionally exploring the lawsuits, criminal trials, and investigations. The project seeks to redeem the story of Hutchins, whose story was minimized by the media.

== Production ==
Rachel Mason was a close friend of Hutchins, and was approached by her husband, Matthew Hutchins, to make a documentary revolving around her life. Mason received approval to film the resuming of production on Rust interviewing Joel Souza and Bianca Cline, among others. Mason reached out to Alec Baldwin, who declined to participate, as he was working on another documentary about production of Rust with Rory Kennedy.

In November 2022, it was announced a documentary revolving around Hutchins was in production, with Liz Garbus and Dan Cogan set to executive produce via Story Syndicate, alongside Matthew Hutchins.

== Release ==
It was released on March 11, 2025, by Hulu.

== Reception ==
On the review aggregator website Rotten Tomatoes, 86% of 14 critics' reviews are positive. Metacritic, which uses a weighted average, assigned the film a score of 70 out of 100, based on five critics, indicating "generally favorable" reviews.

Richard Roeper of the Chicago Sun-Times wrote: "Last Take is a gut-wrenching reminder of a terrible tragedy that happened because mistakes were up and down the line, mistakes that were easily preventable if only the proper and safe measures had been taken." Joe Leydon of Variety wrote: "Director Rachel Mason's Hulu documentary about her late friend is evenhanded and impactful in its pursuit of truth beyond tabloid headlines."

Natalia Winkelman of The New York Times criticized the film's approach, writing: "Despite testimony from Hutchins's friends that repeatedly references her artistry, Mason rarely incorporates clips of Hutchins's cinematography outside Rust. Additional criticism of its approach was made by Joel Souza at a post-screening Q&A for the film directed towards director Rachel Mason and producer Julee Metz, stating: "I hoped it might have a little more Halyna in it or been a little more about Halyna. I know that was your original intention when you talked to me about it. And I could tell when we would talk over the years in the intervening time that you were under some pressure." Mason in an interview responded by stating: "Initially, it was a more independent, keeping-your-head down, doing-what-you-want kind of film. Then it became more commercial. Not just commercial—there were absolute, pressing questions the public had. It was a news story. The public is asking these things. If we don't try to answer them, there will be a question hanging over the film." Sam Adams of Slate wrote in his review: "If the movie has a villain, it's those same commercial incentives."
