= Mary Marlowe Sommer =

American judge

Judge of the First Judicial District Court of New Mexico
- Incumbent
- Assumed office March 30, 2010 - May 31, 2025

Personal details
- Education: George Mason University School of Law

Mary Marlowe Sommer is a judge in the First Judicial District Court of New Mexico. She was appointed by Governor Bill Richardson in 2010, and has since been re-elected and retained in her position.

== Career ==
Marlowe Sommer graduated from Bishop Denis J. O'Connell High School in Arlington, Virginia. She earned her undergraduate degree from Regis College and later graduated from George Mason University School of Law in 1983. Marlowe Sommer is a former law clerk and state attorney.

=== Notable cases ===
Marlowe Sommer has overseen several significant cases, notably involving the accidental shooting on the set of the film "Rust" in 2021. Her courtroom gained attention during the trial of actor Alec Baldwin, who faced charges related to the incident. That case ended with Marlowe Sommer dismissing the charges with prejudice due to the prosecution not disclosing evidence (often called a Brady violation).
