= Heartfall Arises =

2016 Chinese-Hong Kong film by Ng Ban-yu

- Poster
- Traditional Chinese: 驚天破
- Simplified Chinese: 惊天破
- Jyutping: Ging^{1} Tin^{1} Po^{3}
- Directed by: Ng Ban-yu
- Screenplay by: Ng Ban-yu; Samson Sun; Gu Shuyi; He Liangyu
- Story by: Ng Ban-yu
- Produced by: Catherine Hun; Wilson Yip
- Starring: Nicholas Tse; Sean Lau; Tong Liya; Mavis Fan; Vengo Gao
- Cinematography: Sion Michel
- Edited by: Wong Hoi
- Music by: Lam Kwan-fai; Julian Chan
- Production companies: Sil-Metropole Organization; Heng Ye Film Distribution; Guangzhou Changchang Entertainment; Sun Entertainment Culture; Beijing Yuanshi Media; One Cool Film Production; Xingtao Entertainment; Shenzhen Shijie Langchao Media; Sil-Metropole Organization (Guangzhou) Entertainment; Beijing Shengtang Times Media
- Distributed by: Heng Ye Film Distribution; Tianjin Maoyan Media; Shanghai Gewa Business Information Consulting
- Release dates: 20 October 2016 (Hong Kong); 21 October 2016 (China)
- Running time: 108 minutes
- Countries: China; Hong Kong
- Languages: Mandarin; Cantonese
- Box office: RMB 114 million HK$3.97 million

Heartfall Arises is a 2016 suspense crime action drama film directed by Ng Ban-yu and starring Nicholas Tse, Sean Lau, Tong Liya, Mavis Fan and Vengo Gao. A Chinese-Hong Kong co-production, it was scheduled for release in Hong Kong on 20 October 2016 and in China on 21 October 2016 in 4DX, 3D and China Film Giant Screen.

== Plot ==
Heartfall Arises follows two Chinese chess masters who have been entangled in several serial murder cases in relation to the effect of organ transplants. John Ma (Nicholas Tse) a brave cop, and Calvin Che (Sean Lau) a criminal psychologist brought together are under the great threat and struggle to define all means evolved from the killings. Their final confrontation will uncover the lead behind the scene but will also put numerous innocent people in great danger than it is ever known before.

== Cast ==
- Nicholas Tse
- Sean Lau
- Tong Liya
- Mavis Fan
- Vengo Gao
