= Horodets, Korosten Raion, Zhytomyr Oblast =

Horodets Городець
- Village
- Location within Zhytomyr Oblast Location within Ukraine
- Coordinates: 51°22′12″N 28°14′29″E
- Country: Ukraine
- Oblast: Zhytomyr
- District: Korosten
- Founded: 1750

Area
  - Total: 2.757 km^{2} (1.064 sq mi)
- Elevation: 330 m (1,080 ft)

Population (2001 census)
  - Total: 754
  - Density: 273/km^{2} (708/sq mi)
- Time zone: UTC+2 (EET)
  - Summer (DST): UTC+3 (EEST)
- Postal code: 11125
- Area code: +380 41484

Horodets (Ukrainian: Городець, IPA: [ɦoroˈdɛtsʲ]) is a village in Korosten Raion (district) in Zhytomyr Oblast of northern Ukraine. As of the 2001 census, its population is 754.

== Notable people ==
- Halyna Hutchins (1979–2021), cinematographer
