= Sion Michel =

American cinematographer

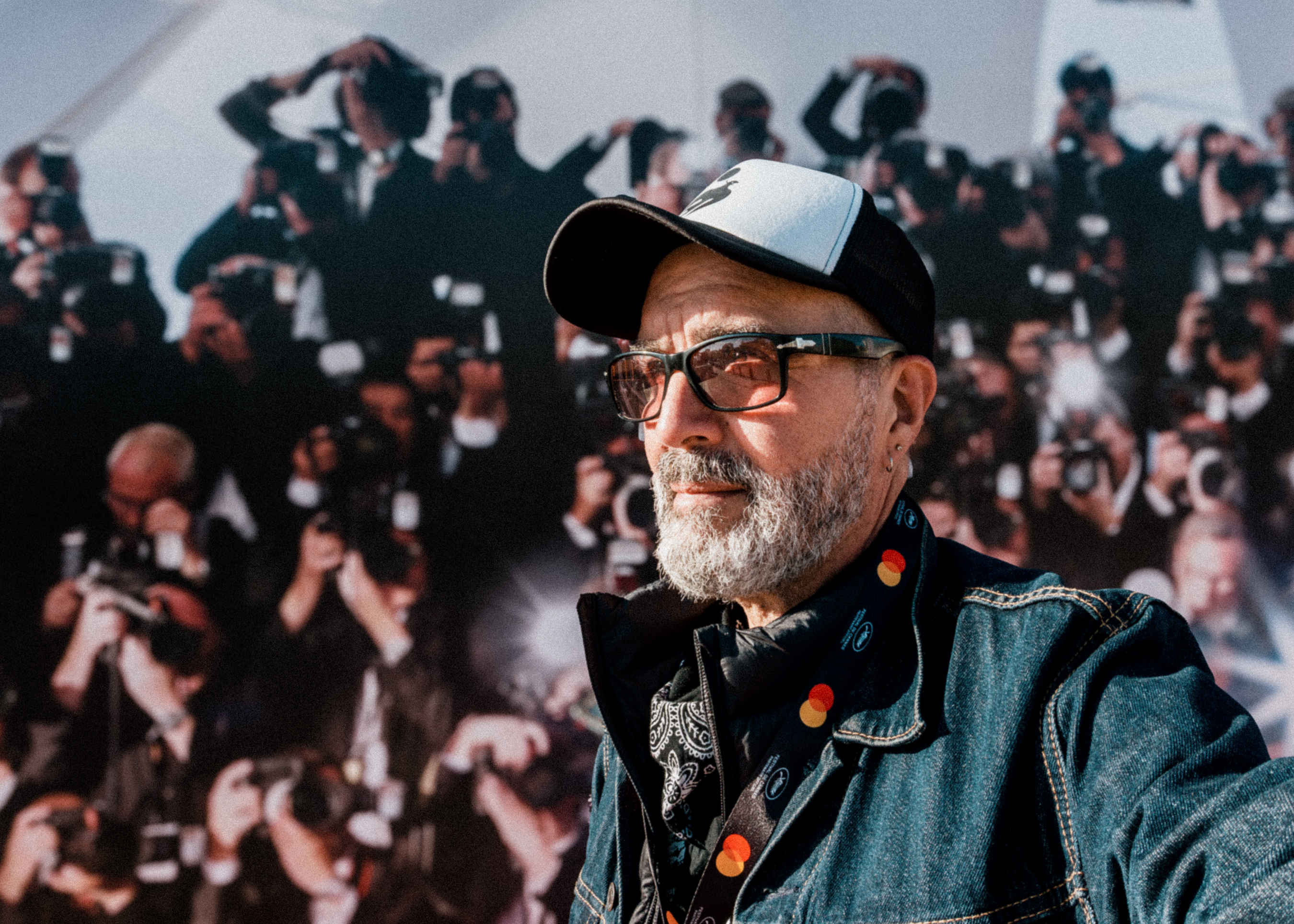
- Sion Michel at the Cannes Film Festival in 2025
- Born: United States
- Education: M.A. in Cinematography, Australian Film, Television and Radio School (1992)
- Occupations: Cinematographer, photographer
- Website: Official website

Sion Michel is an American cinematographer known for his feature film and commercial work.

== Education ==
Sion Michel was born in the United States, and has also spent much of his life in Australia. He was educated at the Australian Film Television and Radio School's Masters Program in Cinematography, receiving an M.A. in Cinematography in 1992. He has been actively working in cinematography and photography since the 1990s. He is an accredited member of the Australian Cinematographers Society (ACS) and is currently based in Los Angeles.

== Career ==
Sion Michel has been an active cinematographer in the film industry since 1986. Michel was cinematographer for films such as The Old Way, Sons of the Neon Night, Heartfall Arises, Shanghai Noir, and Like a Dream, which he was nominated for best cinematography at the 46th Golden Horse Awards in 2009. Other production roles include cinematography work for the films Chasing Rabbits, WPPI 2013, and Laura Smiles.

Michel has lensed feature films, music videos, commercials, and various documentaries. In 2002, he lensed the BBC documentary series Beyond the Fatal Shore, filmed across Australia, which received a British Academy Award nomination for Best Cinematography in 2002. Michel was 2nd unit Director of Photography on Memoirs of a Geisha, which was honored with the Academy Award for Best Cinematography in 2006. Most recently, he collaborated with cinematographer Dion Beebe on Michael, to be released in April 2026.

Michel founded the film production company Mettafilm in 2005, where he currently serves as Director of Photography.

His work includes the ensemble romance Hot Summer Days (2010), co-directed by Tony Chan and Wing Shya, which became the number one box office hit in China during the Chinese New Year; Beijing, New York (2015), directed by Rain Li; The Unbearable Lightness of Inspector Fan (2015), directed by Clara Law; and; Heartfall Arises (2016), directed by Ken Wu. He also lensed the Western thriller The Old Way (2023) for Saban Films and Lionsgate, directed by Brett Donowho and starring Academy Award winner Nicolas Cage.

In 2025, his work Sons of the Neon Night screened at the Cannes Film Festival, premiering in the Midnight Screenings section. The film was directed by Juno Mak and starred Takeshi Kaneshiro, Sean Lau, Tony Leung Ka-fai, Louis Koo, and Gao Yuanyuan.

== Selected filmography ==
Sion Michel's selected cinematography credits include:

Year	Title	Director
2000	Australia: Beyond the Fatal Shore	Chris Spencer
2001	Sydney 2000: Stories of Olympic Glory	Bud Greenspan
2005	Laura Smiles	Jason Ruscio
2007	The Box	A.J. Kparr
2009	Like a Dream	Clara Law
2010	Hot Summer Days	Tony Chan and Wing Shya
2015	The Unbearable Lightness of Inspector Fan (Shanghai Noir)	Clara Law
2016	Heartfall Arises	Wu Pinru
2023	The Old Way	Brett Donowho
2025	Sons of the Neon Night	Juno Mak
2026	Michael	Antoine Fuqua

== Award nominations ==
Sion Michel's cinematography work for Beyond The Fatal Shore, Tony Bennett: An American Classic, and Like a Dream have been nominated for various awards, including the Primetime Emmy Award and BAFTA Film Awards.

- 2002 – British Academy Award for Best Cinematography nomination, for the BBC documentary series Beyond The Fatal Shore
- 2007 – Primetime Emmy Award for Outstanding Technical Direction, Camerawork, Video Control for a Limited Series, Movie, or Special nomination for Tony Bennett: An American Classic, directed by Rob Marshall.
- 2009 – 46th Golden Horse Awards Best Cinematography nomination for the feature Like a Dream, directed by Clara Law.
- 2025 – 2025 Cannes Film Festival - Sons of the Neon Night was shown out of competition at a midnight screening

Michel also received two Silver Awards from the Australian Cinematographers Society (ACS) in 2012 for Julia Stone's By the Horns and Angus Stone's Bird on the Buffalo. In 2014, he won the Silver Telly, the top honor at the 35th Annual Telly Awards, for best direction and cinematography on WPPI 2013 in the Live Event category. His portrait Sarah earned recognition as a Single Image Winner in the "Children" category by Black & White Magazine in 2017.
