= Josh Hopkins =

American actor (born 1970)

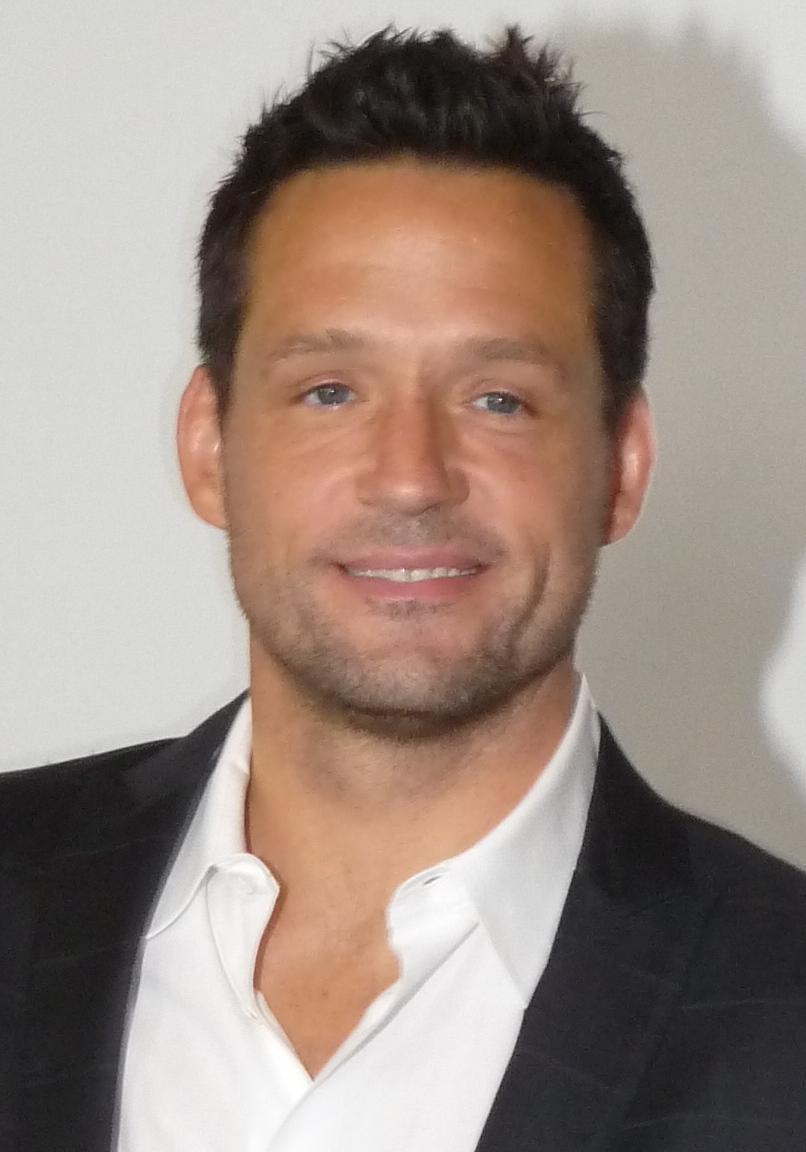
- Hopkins in 2010
- Born: William Joshua Hopkins; September 12, 1970 (age 55); Lexington, Kentucky, U.S.
- Occupation: Actor
- Years active: 1995–present
- Parent: Larry J. Hopkins (father)

William Joshua Hopkins (born September 12, 1970) is an American actor. His best known roles include Raymond Millbury on Ally McBeal (2001–2002), Grayson Ellis on Cougar Town (2009–2015), and Liam O'Connor on Quantico (2015–2016).

== Early life ==
He was born to Larry J. Hopkins (later a U.S. representative) and Carolyn Pennebaker on September 12, 1970. He has two sisters. Hopkins attended The Lexington School and was a member of the JV basketball team.

== Career ==
Hopkins joined the fourth and last season of New York Undercover in 1998. In 1999, Hopkins appeared in Alanis Morissette's "Unsent" music video. He portrayed Paul Allen in the 1999 film Pirates of Silicon Valley and Raymond Milbury on the television series Ally McBeal from 2001 to 2002.

In 2005, Hopkins guest starred on Fox's show Bones as Temperance Brennan's former professor and lover, Michael Stires, in the episode "The Girl in the Fridge". Hopkins has also guest starred in CSI: Miami. In season 1 of the CBS series Cold Case, Hopkins played the role of Assistant District Attorney Jason Kite. The show was especially noted for the on-screen chemistry between Hopkins' character and the character of Detective Lilly Rush, played by Kathryn Morris.

He portrayed womanizer Charlie Babcock on the television series Pepper Dennis in 2006. He later worked with his former Ally McBeal co-star Calista Flockhart when he had a recurring role on Brothers & Sisters. He also had a semi-regular role as Peter Manning on the Fox drama Vanished during 2006.

Hopkins is the writer and performer of the song "Feigning Interest", a humorous music video about dating that became popular in 2007.

Hopkins starred in the 2008 CBS summer drama Swingtown as Roger Thompson. The series was intended for the fall 2007 season, but was postponed due to the writer's strike. It has sparked some controversy for its portrayal of 1970s culture, including open marriage and key parties.

In 2009, Hopkins appeared as Dr. Noah Barnes in season 2 of ABC's Private Practice. He played the character Grayson Ellis on the sitcom Cougar Town, which premiered September 23, 2009, on ABC and later moved to TBS. In 2015, Hopkins joined the main cast for Quantico playing the role of Liam O'Connor, a seasoned FBI agent working in the academy.

In 2018, Hopkins joined the main cast of Whiskey Cavalier in the role of FBI agent Ray Prince.

Hopkins currently works on a podcast called The Rex Chapman Show, which debuted on Basketballnews.com on March 16, 2021, with friend and former NBA player Rex Chapman.

== Filmography ==
=== Film ===
Year	Title	Role	Notes
1996	Parallel Sons	Marty	
1997	G.I. Jane	'Flea'	
2000	Love & Sex	Joey Santino	
2000	The Perfect Storm	Captain Darryl Ennis	
2001	One Eyed King	Chuckie	
2007	The Insatiable	Chet	
2008	Pretty Ugly People	George	
2010	Lebanon, Pa.	Will	
2012	2nd Serve	Owen Match	
2014	Kelly & Cal	Josh	
2014	Get On Up	Ralph Bass	
2014	The Opposite Sex	Kenny	
2016	Car Dogs	Mike Reynolds	
2017	Only the Brave	California Hot Shot Supervisor	
2019	Crown Vic	Jack Van Zandt	
2024	Rust	Wood Helm	

=== Television ===
Year	Title	Role	Notes
1996	Law & Order	Ken Soames	Episode: "Atonement"
1998	Silencing Mary	Clay Roberts	TV movie
1998–1999	New York Undercover	Detective Alec Stone	Main cast (season 4)
1999	Pirates of Silicon Valley	Paul Allen	TV movie
1999–2001	Jack & Jill	Matt Prophet	9 episodes
2000	L.A. Confidential	Officer Bud White	TV pilot (not shown until 2003)
2001	Kate Brasher	Officer Tony Giordano	2 episodes
2001–2002	Ally McBeal	Raymond Millbury	Main cast (season 5)
2003	Law & Order: Special Victims Unit	DEA Special Agent Tim Donovan	Episode: "Loss"
2003–2006	Cold Case	Assistant District Attorney Kite	10 episodes
2004	NYPD 2069	Alex Franco / Alex Bolander	TV movie
2004	North Shore	Morgan Holt	4 episodes
2005	Global Frequency	Sean Flynn	Pilot
2005	Bones	Michael Stires	Episode: "The Girl in the Fridge"
2006	Surrender Dorothy	Peter	TV movie
2006	Vanished	Peter Manning	Recurring cast; 8 episodes
2006	Pepper Dennis	Charlie Babcock	Main cast
2006	Brothers and Sisters	Warren Salter	9 episodes
2007	Ghost Whisperer	Shane Carson	Episode: "No Safe Place"
2008	Swingtown	Roger Thompson	Main cast
2009	12 Men of Christmas	Will Albrecht	TV movie
2009	Pushing Daisies	Shane Trickle	Episode: "Kerplunk"
2009	CSI: Miami	Mark Gantry	2 episodes
2009	Private Practice	Dr. Noah Barnes	5 episodes
2009–2015	Cougar Town	Grayson Ellis	Main cast
2011	Castle	Police Officer	Episode: "Demons"
2012	In Plain Sight	Kenny	2 episodes
2012	Hot in Cleveland	Waiter	Episode: "Love is Blind"; uncredited
2012	Men at Work	Ryan	Episode: "Toilet at Work"
2013	The Client List	Dylan	Episode: "I Ain't Broke But I'm Badly Bent"
2014	Undateable	Julius	Episode: "The Julius Effect"
2014	Northpole	Ryan	TV movie
2015–2016	Quantico	Liam O'Connor	Main cast
2019	True Detective	Jim Dobkins	4 episodes
2019	Whiskey Cavalier	Ray Prince	Main cast
2022	Walker	Fenton Cole	2 episodes
2023	The Rookie	Charles Baudelaire	1 episode
2024	Shrinking	Mac	Episode: "Honesty Era"
