= The Unbearable Lightness of Inspector Fan =

2015 Chinese-Hong Kong film by Clara Law

- Film poster
- 暴走神探
- Directed by: Clara Law
- Written by: Eddie Fong
- Produced by: Derek Yee; Catherine Hun
- Starring: Ethan Juan; Zhou Dongyu; Yang Zishan
- Cinematography: Sion Michel
- Edited by: Jill Bilcock; Hayley Miro Browne
- Music by: Kwan Fai Lam
- Production companies: Le Vision Pictures (Beijing) Co., Ltd. Wuxian Yinghua Film Production Co., Ltd.
- Distributed by: Le Vision Pictures (Beijing) Co., Ltd.
- Release date: January 16, 2015
- Running time: 123 minutes
- Countries: China; Hong Kong
- Language: Mandarin

The Unbearable Lightness of Inspector Fan (Chinese: 暴走神探), also known as Shanghai Noir, is a 2015 comedy action romance suspense film directed by Clara Law. The film is a Chinese-Hong Kong co-production.

The film was lensed by noted director of photography, Sion Michel.

It was released on January 16, 2015.

== Cast ==
- Ethan Juan
- Zhou Dongyu
- Yang Zishan
- Yang Yang
- Jack Kao
- Zhao Lixin
- Jin Song
- Zhang Jingjing
- Liu Yiwei
- Du Haitao
- Guo Qiucheng
