= Crown Vic (film) =

2019 film by Joel Souza

- Theatrical release poster
- Directed by: Joel Souza
- Written by: Joel Souza
- Produced by: Anjul Nigam; Gregg Bello; Maxx Tsai; Alec Baldwin; Peter Toumbekis
- Starring: Thomas Jane; Luke Kleintank; Gregg Bello; David Krumholtz; Bridget Moynahan; Scottie Thompson; Josh Hopkins
- Cinematography: Thomas Scott Stanton
- Edited by: David Andalman
- Music by: Jeffery Alan Jones
- Production company: Brittany House Pictures
- Distributed by: Screen Media Films
- Release dates: April 26, 2019 (Tribeca Film Festival); November 8, 2019 (United States)
- Running time: 110 minutes
- Country: United States
- Language: English
- Budget: $3.6 million
- Box office: $3,868

Crown Vic is a 2019 American crime thriller film written and directed by Joel Souza, starring Thomas Jane, Luke Kleintank, Gregg Bello, David Krumholtz, Bridget Moynahan, Scottie Thompson, and Josh Hopkins. The film focuses on the events during a night shift for veteran LAPD officer Ray Mandel and his trainee Nick Holland. The film's title derives from the Ford Crown Victoria, a car widely used by US police, which the main characters also use.

Crown Vic premiered on April 26, 2019, in the Tribeca Film Festival, and was released to theatres and on-demand on November 8, 2019 in the United States. The film received mixed reviews from critics, who noted similarities with the 2001 film Training Day.

== Plot ==
Nick Holland is a newly minted officer with the Los Angeles Police Department. On his first night shift, he is assigned to patrol the city with experienced policeman Ray Mandel. Ray and Nick are completely different personalities; while Nick is a down-to-earth, self-proclaimed world improver, Ray is a divorced pessimist with a penchant for breaking the rules and resorting to violence. In their shift, they respond to all kinds of incidents, from robberies to domestic unrest to car fires. They also rescue a suspect who is nearly killed by a reckless plainclothes officer. Ray has the drug-addicted widow of his former partner picked up so he can talk to her and try to help her, and he has her abusive boyfriend taken in by another officer. Later, he goes off-duty and outside his territory to rescue his former partner's daughter, who was abandoned by her mother, who could not handle her. Ray admits to being the girl's biological father. The cops also find the abandoned car, which was driven by masked robbers who killed several people and were shown in the opening scene and several more times. In a traffic stop, Nick is taken hostage and almost killed.

== Cast ==
- Thomas Jane as Ray Mandel
- Luke Kleintank as Nick Holland
- Gregg Bello as Don Koski
- David Krumholtz as Stroke Adams
- Bridget Moynahan as Tracy Peters
- Scottie Thompson as Claire
- Josh Hopkins as Jack VanZandt
- Devon Werkheiser as Floyd Stiles
- Emma Ishta as Ally

== Production ==
Souza wrote the script in ten days.

In April 2016, Variety announced that Alec Baldwin and Scott Eastwood were slated for the lead roles in Crown Vic, with Joel Souza writing and directing. However, in May 2018, the roles were subsequently taken over by Thomas Jane and Luke Kleintank, respectively.

Despite being set in Los Angeles, the movie was filmed in Buffalo, New York. Baldwin, who had since served as a producer instead, told The Hollywood Reporter that he had to miss the opportunity to star in the film.

== Release ==
Crown Vic had its world premiere at the Tribeca Film Festival on April 26, 2019. It was released in select theaters on November 8, 2019, and on VOD by Screen Media Films on January 7, 2020.

== Reception ==
=== Box office ===
Crown Vic grossed $3,868 in one opening theatre in North America against a production budget of $3.6 million.

=== Critical response ===
On review aggregator Rotten Tomatoes, the film holds an approval rating of 62% based on 26 reviews, with an average rating of 6/10. The website's critics consensus reads, "Led by a solid turn from the well-cast Thomas Jane, Crown Vic gets an impressive amount of mileage out of its familiar cop thriller framework." On Metacritic, the film has a weighted average score of 47 out of 100, based on 7 critics, indicating "mixed or average" reviews.

Glenn Kenny of RogerEbert.com awarded the film one and a half stars out of four, commenting, "Aside from a rock-solid performance by Thomas Jane as the grizzled cop, Crown Vic, which is named after the Ford model car that is the default of the LAPD black-and-white, has very little to offer the discriminating moviegoer." Movie Nation's Roger Moore gave the film two stars out of four, stating "Crown Vic is a grounded and gritty cops-on-the-night-shift melodrama built around a tightly coiled turn by Thomas Jane... Crown Vic isn't a bad picture. It's just too unexceptional to stand out." Rex Reed of Observer Media gave the film two stars out of four and said, "I never cease to wonder how some films manage to borrow, imitate, copy, or steal from older films without acknowledging or crediting the originals. A predictable, ho-hum police procedural called Crown Vic, about one night of violence and death with a veteran Los Angeles cop assigned to escort a rookie cop through the criminal underground while teaching him the ropes, is so close to the 2001 Training Day that it's practically a remake."

Dennis Harvey of Variety noted, "That's a lot of narrative content, and Crown Vic varies in involvement and credibility as it juggles the more melodramatic aspects with the quasi-vérité ones. Still, it all works more often than not, thanks to the able lead performances and Souza's generally smooth handling." Frank Scheck of The Hollywood Reporter stated, "The filmmaker displays a genuine flair for staging exciting action sequences, and the ever-reliable Jane delivers a solid lead performance, here tempering his natural machismo with a sympathetic, mournful quality. But there's just too much about Crown Vic that we haven't [sic] seen a thousand times before, to more impactful effect."
