= Stembridge Gun Rentals =

American suppliers of prop weapons

Stembridge Gun Rentals was a prop weapons provider to the US movie and television industry from approximately 1920 through 2007. During its tenure, nearly every American movie or television set was supplied by Stembridge for their firearms and blanks.

== Founding ==
The company was founded by James Sidney Stembridge, who was born in Georgia after the Civil War and served as a drill sergeant in the Philippines during the Spanish-American War. After the war Stembridge worked in Hollywood as an actor. He appeared in The Trail of the Lonesome Pine (1923).

Working as an extra on the Cecil B. DeMille film The Squaw Man (1913), Stembridge was present when DeMille lamented that most of the extras did not know how to portray soldiers. As a former drill sergeant himself, Stembridge offered to coach the other extras. He developed a friendship with DeMille and went to work for him. During World War I, when many war movies were being made, Stembridge saw that movie sets were having trouble accessing weapons. He suggested to DeMille that he set up an arsenal. Paramount subsidized the purchase of the guns, while Stembridge maintained and housed them and rented them back to the studio.

Stembridge Gun Rentals became a lucrative business. Its first offices were located at 5451 Marathon Street, itself a Paramount backlot. The business was generally known in the film industry as the "Gun Room", as numerous clients throughout the industry rented from Stembridge.

== History ==
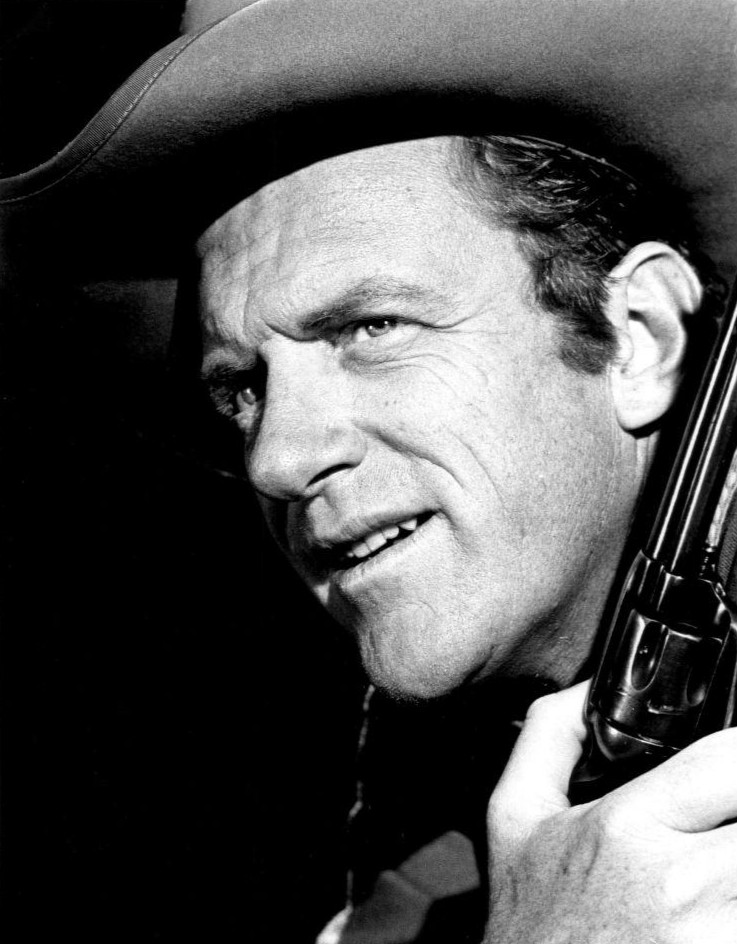
James Arness as Matt Dillon

The company was managed by Fritz Dickie from 1927 through 1974. In 1933 Stembridge's nephew, Ed Stembridge, also joined the firm.

By 1940 the business had an arsenal of 7,000 rifles, 1,200 revolvers, and 200 machine guns, including Thompson M1921s and M1928s, and was considered one of the largest private arsenals in the country.

On December 7, 1941, Fritz Dickie was contacted by the US Coast Guard to requisition Stembridge's arsenal for use in the event of an invasion by the Japanese, who had just bombed Pearl Harbor. The company also loaned weapons to the California State Guard and California National Guard, and after the weapons were returned they received a letter of thanks from the Harbor Defenses command and signed by Colonel W. W. Hicks of the Coast Artillery Corps. During the early years of World War II, before the company got its arsenal back, it was forced to improvise weapons to outfit war movie sets.

After James Stembridge died in 1942 at the age of 72, the company was taken over by Dickie and Ed Stembridge, who had served as an ordnance officer during World War II.

As the company gradually was able to purchase more newer weapons, including those captured in the war and demobilized equipment, it supplied weapons for training films.

In the firm's 7,000-gun collection in 1969 were two functional Gatling guns; two 17th-century German rifles, a matchlock and a wheellock; and an 1850 palm pistol. Displays of guns of industry interest included Matt Dillon's Colt single-action, Wyatt Earp's Colt Buntline, Bat Masterson's Colt Storekeeper, and Paladin's double-barrel derringer. Almost all of the guns in the collection were fireable. At the time the company was manufacturing 430,000 blank rounds a year, and almost every US movie or television show in existence that showed a firearm firing had been supplied by Stembridge.

By the 1980s the firm had over 10,000 weapons, including many of historical interest. The settlement of a family estate forced the sale of most of them. Many were purchased by Robert Petersen.

== Other notable weapons ==
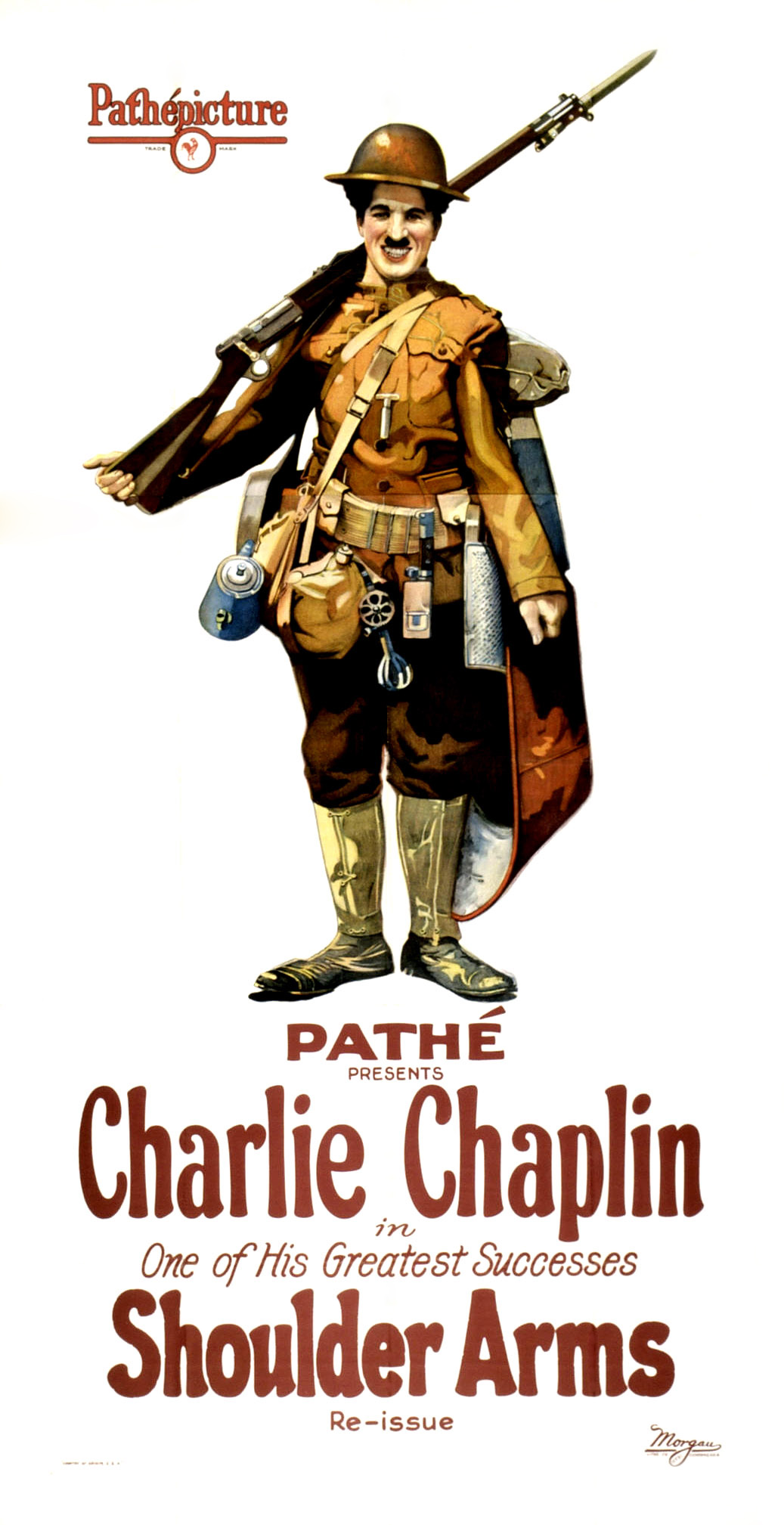
Chaplin with the rifle Stembridge supplied

The firm supplied the Thompsons used to kill Sonny Corleone in The Godfather (1972). For the 1990 movie Dick Tracy the company supplied 25 Thompsons and rebarrelled, reblued, and reblanked all of them. It supplied a Thompson for a Michael Jackson music video of "Smooth Criminal" in which Jackson did a 360° spin while firing off all fifty rounds.

When the 1992 biopic Chaplin was being filmed, producers asked Stembridge if they could supply a rifle similar to the one Charlie Chaplin had used in the 1918 movie Shoulder Arms. Stembridge had it on hand and was able to supply the actual gun Chaplin had used.

== Disbanding ==
Most of the remaining arsenal was auctioned in 2007. As of 2008 the company still had 22 Thompsons. As late as 2013 nearly every movie made in Hollywood had been supplied by Stembridge Gun Rentals. What remained of the company had moved to Glendale by 2013 and was being run by Syd Stembridge, the great-nephew of James. Most of Stembridge's arsenal ended up at Independent Studio Services.
