= Independent Studio Services =

Independent Studio Services or ISS is a prop supplier for television and film production studios. Props provided by ISS have been used in numerous motion pictures and television programs. ISS was founded in 1977 by Gregg Bilson, Sr., and is currently based in Sunland, California, with satellite branches in New Mexico, Georgia, Louisiana, Michigan, Massachusetts, and New York.

== Banknotes ==
ISS provided prop banknotes for the film Rush Hour 2, which starred Jackie Chan and Chris Tucker. The film's plot involved the production of high quality counterfeit United States currency, known as "superbills," by Hong Kong–based triads which laundered them through a Las Vegas casino. While filming in Las Vegas, prop banknotes with a face value of US$1 billion were blown up; however, the explosion failed to destroy all the banknotes. Many were scattered through the air, and picked up by bystanders. The prop banknotes were found in Las Vegas, Los Angeles, and as far away as Minneapolis. The United States Secret Service ordered ISS to stop producing the banknotes, recalled the banknotes from every production company that had ordered them, and seized banknotes from the company's location in Sun Valley, California.

== Firearms ==
ISS supplies prop weapons. Many of their arsenal was purchased from Stembridge Gun Rentals.

== Fictional brands ==
Fictional brands of products are produced by Studio Graphics, a division of ISS. Many of these brands have appeared in multiple film and television productions.

- Soft Drink: Cabot-Cola, Jekyll Island Rootbeer.
- Snack: Let's potato chips
- Beer: HaberKern, Heisler, Jekyll Island, Matador Lager, and Penzburg.
- Whiskey: Clermont Bourbon, J. Darby Bourbon, J. Darby Scotch, Gardner Scotch, Glencallan Scotch, Good Old Days Bourbon, Jake Danzels Old No. 2, Killarney Dell Irish Whiskey, Natape Scotch, Old & Rare Blended Scotch.
- Cigarettes: Brezza Blue, Brezza Red, Bilson Lights, Bilson Menthol, Morley Reds
