= Squib load =

Firearm malfunction

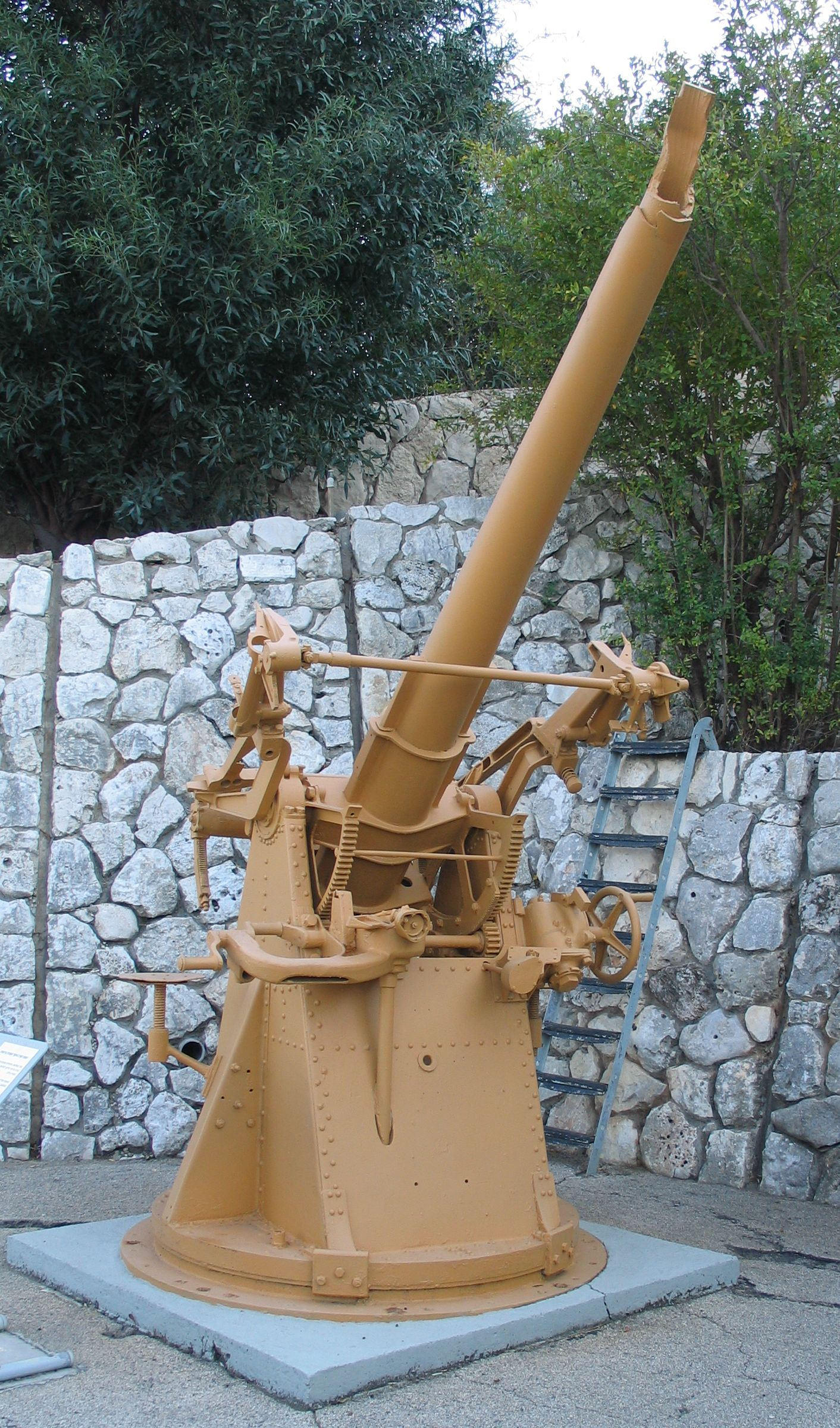
British-made three-inch coastal gun damaged by a squib

A squib load, also known as a squib round, pop and no kick, or just a squib, is a firearm malfunction in which a fired projectile does not have enough force behind it to exit the barrel, and thus becomes stuck. This type of malfunction can be extremely dangerous, as failing to notice that the projectile has become stuck in the barrel may result in another round being fired directly into the obstructed barrel, resulting in a catastrophic failure of the weapon's structural integrity.

== Causes ==
Squib rounds are possible in all firearms. They are most often caused by negligence in the powder loading process (insufficient or no powder load), or a failure of the primer to ignite the powder at all. In the case of no gunpowder in the cartridge, the primer, when struck, produces just enough force to push the bullet into the barrel but no further. Subsequent rounds will pile up in a very strong weapon or destroy a weaker one. While this occurs most often because of handloading by inexperienced reloaders, squib loads are known to occur even in reputable factory brands. Other causes include deformed bullets and attempting to fire a bullet which is slightly too large for the barrel, although both of these scenarios would more likely result in some variety of catastrophic failure instead of a squib.

A weapon that has been subjected to the abuse of a stuck bullet then had another one fired, will display a slight bulge in the barrel at the site of the original stuck bullet (provided the weapon survives). This bulge sometimes presents itself as a ring around the barrel or can be detected by sliding one's fingers along the barrel to check for this occurrence should no ring be seen.

A well-known example of a squib load is one that killed actor Brandon Lee on the set of the film The Crow. A squib from an improperly made dummy round (no powder charge, but with a bullet and a live primer) from a previous scene was stuck inside the barrel and propelled from the same weapon which had been loaded with a blank cartridge, which coupled with the stuck bullet acted like a live round striking Lee in the abdomen and killing him.

== Diagnosis ==
Signs of a squib include:

- Much quieter and unusual discharge noise. Smaller or empty powder loads, combined with the primer discharge echoing in the casing or barrel, produce an unusual noise. This noise is often called a "ping" or "pop", rather than the expected "bang" of a standard shot.
- Lighter or nonexistent felt recoil force. Lower force on the projectile, insufficient to clear the barrel, translates to a lower recoil force, which may be completely absorbed by the firearm's recoil mechanisms.
- Discharge from the ejection port or cylinder gap, instead of the barrel. The primer and any burned powder produce smoke, though less than a standard load. This smoke cannot be vented through the barrel as normal, and must escape elsewhere.
- Failure of the action to cycle (in automatic or semi-automatic firearms). Recoil operated, blowback, and blow forward semi-automatic designs rely on the recoil force to eject the spent casing and cycle the next round. Lighter recoil force may not be sufficient to cycle the action. Likewise, gas operated firearms may have insufficient volume of gas to cycle the weapon.

Squib loads are also referred to as "pop and no kick", in recognition of the above symptoms.

== See also ==
- Hang fire
- Squib (explosive)
