= Rust (2024 film) =

Film by Joel Souza

- Theatrical release poster
- Directed by: Joel Souza
- Screenplay by: Joel Souza
- Story by: Joel Souza; Alec Baldwin
- Produced by: Melina Spadone; Ryan Winterstern; Nathan Klingher; Alec Baldwin; Matt DelPiano; Ryan Donnell Smith; Anjul Nigam; Grant Hill
- Starring: Alec Baldwin; Josh Hopkins; Patrick Scott McDermott; Frances Fisher; Travis Fimmel
- Cinematography: Halyna Hutchins; Bianca Cline
- Edited by: David Andalman
- Music by: James Jackson; Lilie Bytheway-Hoy
- Production companies: El Dorado Pictures; Short Porch Pictures; Thomasville Pictures; April Productions
- Distributed by: Falling Forward Films
- Release dates: November 20, 2024 (Camerimage); May 2, 2025 (United States)
- Running time: 140 minutes
- Country: United States
- Language: English
- Budget: $8 million
- Box office: $26,831

Rust is a 2024 American Western film written and directed by Joel Souza. It stars Alec Baldwin (who also produced and co-wrote the story with Souza), Patrick Scott McDermott, Josh Hopkins, Frances Fisher, and Travis Fimmel. The film follows an outlaw and his grandson as they flee toward Mexico.

Three years before its release, the film gained notoriety due to a shooting accident in which Souza and cinematographer Halyna Hutchins were shot after a live round was discharged from a prop revolver fired between takes by Baldwin. Hutchins died shortly after, while Souza was injured. An initial set of charges against Baldwin were dropped in 2023 and another set dismissed in 2024. Producers, including Baldwin, eventually decided to resume filming, with approval from Halyna's mother and family. Souza has since expressed regret in having begun production on the film at all, stating that "I wish I never wrote the damn movie".

The completed project premiered at the Polish film festival Camerimage on November 20, 2024. Rust was released theatrically in the United States on May 2, 2025 to mixed reviews. The film grossed only $26,831 on opening night against a budget of $8 million.

== Plot ==
In 1882 Wyoming Territory, 13-year-old Lucas Hollister cares for his younger brother Jacob after the recent deaths of their parents from illness. While chasing a wolf, Lucas accidentally kills the father of a boy who has been bullying Jacob and is sentenced to hang. Before the execution, he is broken out of jail by a stranger who reveals himself to be his estranged grandfather, notorious outlaw Harland Rust. The two flee south toward the Mexican border.

As they travel through the New Mexico Territory, the initial animosity between them eases, and they bond over a shared history of family loss. They are pursued by two parties: U.S. Marshal Wood Helm and his posse, and several bounty hunters, one of whom is the unstable Fenton "Preacher" Lang. A group of Kiowa also pose a danger to the fugitives, but Lucas pacifies them by trading a valuable rifle for a horse.

The bounty hunters and Helm come upon Lucas and Harland at the same time, and the two groups of pursuers engage in a deadly shootout. Harland and Lucas escape, but are pursued and cornered by Lang, who shoots Harland and takes Lucas captive. Helm arrives and in the confrontation that follows, a gravely wounded Harland saves the Marshal's life by gunning down Lang. A gracious Helm, who has recently lost his own son to illness, allows Lucas to go free while taking Harland in.

Helm lies to other US Marshals that Lucas died in the pursuit and his body was scavenged by the Kiowa. Harland dies on the way to the gallows; his body is hanged anyway. Lucas reaches Mexico with the help of Harland's friend Anselmo, to whom he introduces himself as Lucas Rust, and in Mexico is reunited with Jacob who has been taken in by their great-aunt, Harland's sister.

== Cast ==
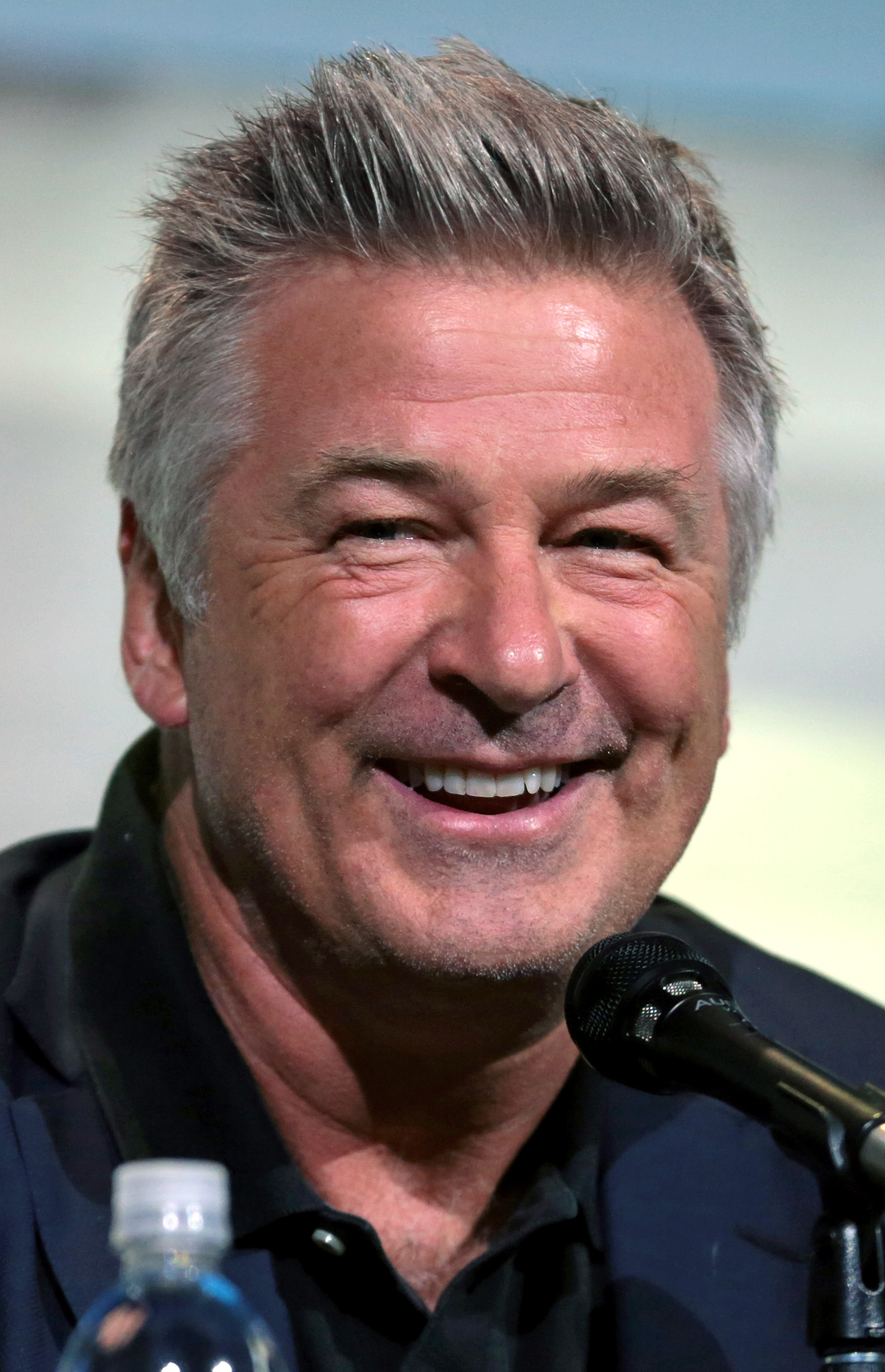
Alec Baldwin stars as Harland Rust.

- Alec Baldwin as Harland Rust, an elderly outlaw
- Patrick Scott McDermott as Lucas Hollister, Harland's grandson
- Travis Fimmel as Fenton "Preacher" Lang, a bounty hunter
- Frances Fisher as Evelyn Basset, Lucas's grand-aunt
- Jake Busey as Drum Parker, a deputy marshal
- Josh Hopkins as U.S. Marshal Wood Helm
- Devon Werkheiser as Boone LaFontaine
- Rhys Coiro as Clete Lafontaine
- Richard Gunn as Sheriff Tom Long
- Asha Bee as Abigail
- Aria Alpert Adjani as Kate Bowdry
- Easton Malcolm as Jacob Hollister
- Abraham Benrubi as Big Bill Cochrane

== Production ==
=== Development ===
In May 2020, it was announced that Alec Baldwin would produce and star in Rust, a Western based on a story he created with writer and director Joel Souza. Baldwin told The Hollywood Reporter that he was elated to work with Souza after missing the opportunity to star in Crown Vic (2019). He compared the screenplay to the film Unforgiven (1992), and said it was inspired by a true story. When asked about his gun slinging and horse riding skills, he said: "They're always at the ready. I'm an actor of the old school. So if you read my resume—my motorcycle riding, my French, juggling, my horseback riding, my gunplay—is all right at my fingertips at all times."

In October 2021, production was suspended after cinematographer Halyna Hutchins was fatally shot when a gun being used as a prop was fired by Baldwin during the preparation for a scene; Souza was injured by the same round. A number of lawsuits were filed and eventually manslaughter charges were filed against Baldwin and armorer Hannah Gutierrez-Reed. Filming finally restarted in April 2023 and was completed soon after. Gutierrez-Reed was ultimately found guilty but Baldwin was acquitted.

Rust was being produced on a $6–7 million budget and has been described as a "passion project" for Baldwin. The film's distribution rights were sold to The Avenue for $2 million during the pre-production phase. Travis Fimmel, Brady Noon, and Frances Fisher joined the cast in September 2021, with Jensen Ackles being cast the following month. The production involved approximately 150 crew members, half of them local, 22 principal and 230 background actors from New Mexico. The production had a filming schedule of 21 days. Filming began in New Mexico on October 6, 2021.

=== Shooting incident ===
On the morning of October 21, 2021, which was to be the twelfth day of filming, seven unionized members of the film's camera crew began collecting their belongings at approximately 6:30 a.m. MT in a walkout. They claim they were told to leave the set, with a producer threatening to call the police, and were replaced with nonunion crew members. According to a statement given to TheWrap by an anonymous insider, several crew members took a number of prop guns off-set that day, including the firearm involved in the incident, to pass the time shooting at beer cans with live ammunition. After a lunch break, the prop guns had been returned. It is not clear if the firearms were checked again. On October 26, the Santa Fe County district attorney said these claims were still unconfirmed.

Later that day, the cast and crew were rehearsing a gunfight scene taking place inside of a church at the Bonanza Creek Ranch. Firearms and ammunition were retrieved from a locked safe and armorer Hannah Gutierrez-Reed placed three guns to be used in filming on a cart. Among them were a plastic gun that could not shoot live ammunition, a modified weapon that could not fire any type of ammunition, and a solid-frame .45 Colt revolver replica made by Pietta.

According to a search warrant, the guns were briefly checked by Gutierrez-Reed, before assistant director David Halls took the Pietta revolver from the prop cart and handed it to Baldwin. In a subsequent affidavit, Halls said the safety protocol regarding this firearm was such that Halls would open the loading gate of the revolver and rotate the cylinder to expose the chambers so he could inspect them himself. According to the affidavit, Halls said he did not check all cylinder chambers, but he recalled seeing three rounds in the cylinder at the time. After the shooting, Halls said in the affidavit, Gutierrez-Reed retrieved the weapon and opened it, and Halls said that he saw four rounds which were plainly blanks, and one which could have been the remaining shell of a discharged live round. In the warrant, it is further stated that Halls announced the term "cold gun", meaning that it did not contain live rounds. Halls's lawyer, Lisa Torraco, later sought to assert that he did not take the gun off the cart and hand it to Baldwin as reported, but when pressed by a reporter to be clear, she refused to repeat that assertion.

B-camera operator Reid Russell was situated on a camera dolly, looking at a monitor with Hutchins and Souza both nearby. The scene involved Baldwin's character removing a gun from its holster and pointing it toward the camera. The trio behind the monitor were two feet (0.6 m) from the muzzle of the firearm and none of them were wearing protective gear such as noise-canceling headphones or safety goggles.

The trio behind the monitor began repositioning the camera to remove a shadow, and Baldwin began explaining to the crew how he planned to draw the firearm. He said, "So, I guess I'm gonna take this out, pull it, and go, 'Bang!'" He removed it from the holster, and the revolver discharged a single time. Baldwin denied pulling the trigger of the gun, while ABC News described a later FBI report stating that the gun could only fire if the trigger was pulled. Halls was quoted by his attorney Lisa Torraco as saying that Baldwin did not pull the trigger, and that Baldwin's finger was never within the trigger guard during the incident. When the gun fired, the projectile traveled towards the three behind the monitor. It struck Hutchins in the chest, traveled through her body, and then hit Souza in the shoulder. Script supervisor Mamie Mitchell called 911 at 1:46 p.m. MT and emergency crews appeared three minutes later. Footage of the incident was not recorded.

Hutchins was flown by helicopter to the University of New Mexico Hospital in Albuquerque, where she was pronounced dead. Souza was treated by EMS and transported by ambulance to Christus St. Vincent Regional Medical Center in Santa Fe, where he was admitted and released by the following morning.

As a result of the incident, production on Rust was suspended indefinitely, though co-producer Anjul Nigam was confident the film would resume production once the investigation ended. However, Nigam later clarified that he meant to express optimism and hope, rather than confidence, as he stated that many involved in the production hope to honor Hutchins by completing her final work.

=== Spider bite incident ===
In November 2021, weeks after the shooting incident, lamp operator and pipe rigger Jason Miller was bitten on the arm by a brown recluse spider while closing the set. Miller suffered necrosis and sepsis. He was hospitalized and underwent multiple surgeries to avoid amputation of his arm.

=== Resumed production ===
In October 2022, the Hutchins family settled the lawsuit, with filming set to resume in January 2023 in California, with Matthew Hutchins, Halyna's husband, as an executive producer. Many of the film's crew gave mixed reactions towards the news, with some supporting it and planning on resuming their work on it, but others condemning the decision and deciding not to return. On January 18, filming was delayed again after New Mexico First Judicial District Attorney Mary Carmack-Altwies decided to charge Baldwin with involuntary manslaughter. In February 2023, it was reported that filming would resume in spring 2023 with Souza directing and Bianca Cline as cinematographer. Grant Hill was added as producer. The new shooting location was reported to be Yellowstone Film Ranch in Livingston, Montana. Producers stated that the use of working weapons or ammunition would be prohibited.

Production of the film resumed on April 20, 2023. The same day, it was reported that prosecutors had informed Baldwin that the charges against him were being dropped and the new, updated cast was released. Meanwhile, Patrick Scott McDermott was confirmed to have replaced Noon. By May 2023, Jensen Ackles left due to scheduling conflicts; a new character is played by Josh Hopkins. On April 24, 2023, Baldwin returned to the set to finish filming his scenes, with the production concluding on May 22, 2023.

== Release ==
Rust held its world premiere at Camerimage on November 20, 2024, in Toruń, Poland. The film was released theatrically and on video-on-demand (VOD) on May 2, 2025, by Falling Forward Films. The film was released on 150 screens, while Decal Releasing handled the home release.

== Reception ==
=== Box office ===
It was estimated that the film made $25,000 at 115 theaters on its opening day.

=== Critical response ===
On the review aggregator website Rotten Tomatoes, 57% of 49 critics' reviews are positive, with an average rating of 5.6/10. The website's consensus reads: "A middling drama overshadowed by tragic circumstances, Rust boasts a handsome look but doesn't bring much distinctive flavor to the Western genre." Metacritic, which uses a weighted average, assigned the film a score of 46 out of 100, based on 21 critics, indicating "mixed or average" reviews.

Owen Gleiberman wrote in his review for Variety that "it's a handsome and watchable indie art Western, set in 1882, that turns into a sentimental cross-generational buddy film. Yet I can't say that the movie, in the end, is especially good."

The New York Times called the film "a derivative, hyperviolent, finally sentimental drama set in the 19th century about an orphan (Patrick Scott McDermott) and his outlaw grandfather (Baldwin) that's filled with mayhem and carnage."

The cinematography by Hutchins and co-cinematographer Bianca Cline was praised. David Ehrlich, writing for IndieWire, said that "the film's digital gloss dovetails with the rustic elementalism of its genre, whereas so many other recent Westerns have forced those two aesthetics into direct confrontation with each other", while Jesse Hassenger, writing for The Guardian, described Hutchins as "the movie's saving grace".

== See also ==
- List of film and television accidents
