= Joel Souza =

American film director and screenwriter (born 1973)

- Born: June 14, 1973 (age 53); Fremont, California, U.S.
- Occupations: Film director, screenwriter
- Years active: 2010–present
- Children: 2

Joel Souza (born June 14, 1973) is an American film director and screenwriter.

== Career ==
Souza was initially inspired to become a filmmaker after viewing the Indiana Jones film Raiders of the Lost Ark (1981).

As a writer and director, Souza debuted in 2010 with the family adventure film Hannah's Gold, starring Luke Perry. The thriller Crown Vic, which featured the life behind the wheel of a patrol car, premiered at the Tribeca Film Festival, and received mixed reviews from critics, who noted substantial similarities between Crown Vic and the 2001 film Training Day.

=== 2021 Rust shooting incident ===
On October 21, 2021, Souza was injured by a discharge from a prop gun fired by actor Alec Baldwin while filming Rust. Cinematographer Halyna Hutchins died in the incident.

== Personal life ==
Souza lives in the San Francisco Bay Area, and is married with two children.

== Filmography ==
Year	Title	Director	Writer	Producer	Ref.
2010	Hannah's Gold	Yes	Yes	No	
2015	Ghost Squad	Yes	Yes	No	
2015	Christmas Trade	Yes	Yes	No	
2017	Break Night	Yes	Yes	Yes	
2019	Crown Vic	Yes	Yes	No	
2024	Rust	Yes	Yes	No	
TBA	Red Card	Yes	No	No	
