= Halyna Hutchins =

Ukrainian cinematographer (1979–2021)

- Галина Хатчінс
- Hutchins in 2020
- Born: Halyna Anatoliivna Androsovych; April 9, 1979; Horodets, Ukrainian SSR, Soviet Union
- Died: October 21, 2021 (aged 42); Albuquerque, New Mexico, U.S.
- Cause of death: Gunshot wound
- Resting place: Hollywood Forever Cemetery
- Occupations: Cinematographer; journalist
- Years active: 2006–2021
- Spouse: Matthew Hutchins (m. 2005)
- Children: 1
- Website: halynahutchinsdp.com

Halyna Anatoliivna Hutchins (Note: In this name that follows East Slavic naming customs, the patronymic is Anatoliivna and the family name is Androsovych or Hutchins.) (Note: Ukrainian: Галина Анатоліївна Хатчінс, romanized: Halyna Anatoliivna Khatchins) (née Androsovych; (Note: Ukrainian: Андросович, romanized: Androsovych) April 9, 1979 – October 21, 2021) was a Ukrainian cinematographer. She worked on more than 30 feature-length films, short films, and TV miniseries, including the films Archenemy, Darlin', and Blindfire.

On October 21, 2021, during production on the set of the film Rust, she was shot and killed by actor and producer Alec Baldwin when he mistakenly fired a bullet from a firearm he was using as a movie prop, one he assumed was loaded with dummy rounds. The gun was under the care of Hannah Gutierrez-Reed, the set armorer who did not properly check the gun.

The resulting criminal cases filed after Hutchins's death dealt primarily with assigning negligence to the people on set, and investigating how a live round ended up inside of the gun.

== Early life and education ==
Hutchins was born to a Ukrainian family on April 9, 1979, in Gorodets, Ukrainian SSR, Soviet Union (now Horodets, Ukraine). She grew up in the Russian city of Murmansk, on a Soviet military base in the Arctic. There, her father served in the Soviet Navy. She called herself an "army brat". According to film historian Jim Hemphill, she first became interested in film while living at the military base. She attended National Agricultural University and then Kyiv National University, first studying economics before changing her study to journalism. Hutchins graduated with a degree in international journalism and worked on documentary films as an investigative journalist in Eastern Europe. She met her husband Matthew, who is American, while in the US. They had a son. Though living in the US, she maintained her Ukrainian citizenship, remained proud of her heritage, and often returned to visit.

== Career ==
Hutchins moved to Los Angeles to focus on filmmaking, taking on roles in production and fashion photography. She was an associate producer for World's Tallest Man, a 2006 film about Leonid Stadnyk by Wild Pictures; the film was premiered on the Discovery Channel. In 2010, she graduated from UCLA TFT Professional Program in Producing. In Los Angeles, she met Bob Primes, a cinematographer. He encouraged Hutchins to apply to the American Film Institute Conservatory, where he was a teacher. She was accepted and began studying there in 2013 for a two-year master's program, which she graduated from in 2015. Stephen Lighthill mentored her there. Her thesis project, Hidden, made with director Rayan Farzad, was screened at the LA Shorts Fest, Camerimage International Film Festival, AFI Fest and the Austin Film Festival.

In 2018, she was one of the first eight female cinematographers participating in the Fox DP Lab program, which was established to provide greater opportunities for women cinematographers. In 2019, she was named one of the "10 up-and-coming directors of photography who are making their mark" by American Cinematographer.

She was director of photography on Adam Egypt Mortimer's 2020 film Archenemy. Mortimer had said of her, that her "tastes and sensibility of what is cinematic were a huge asset for executing our style" and that "her AFI training and her skill with the math of LUT settings gave us the best texture I've found yet in shooting digital".

She is also credited for work on the films Darlin' (2019), Blindfire (2020) and The Mad Hatter (2021). She was credited for her cinematographic work on Darlin' by Hollywood.com, where the film was highlighted after its feature at the March 2019 South by Southwest film festival, in the Narrative Feature Competition.

== Activism ==
Hutchins was a member of the International Cinematographers Guild and the International Alliance of Theatrical Stage Employees, labor unions that represent entertainment industry's crew and technical workers in the US and Canada. She supported the IATSE strike over working conditions days before her death.

== Death ==
Hutchins was the director of photography on the Western film Rust. While working on set near La Cienega, New Mexico, preparing for a scene, actor Alec Baldwin discharged a Pietta .45 Colt revolver, injuring director Joel Souza, and fatally wounding Hutchins. She died later that day while being transferred to the University of New Mexico Hospital in Albuquerque. The next day Baldwin expressed his shock and sadness at the incident. He said he would cooperate with police, and offered support to her family.

A candlelight vigil at the Albuquerque Civic Plaza organized by local IATSE chapters was held on October 23. It drew hundreds of people. She is buried at Hollywood Forever Cemetery in Hollywood, California.

Hutchins's family filed a lawsuit against Baldwin and other crew members of the film Rust alleging that her wrongful death on the set was caused by irresponsible behavior and cost-cutting. The lawsuit was settled for undisclosed sums, with her widower being given a job as executive producer of the film.

Rust first assistant director David Halls pleaded guilty to negligent use of a deadly weapon, and received a suspended sentence and six months of probation. Halls pleaded no contest to an additional misdemeanor charge of negligent use of a deadly weapon, for which he received a sentence of six months of unsupervised probation, a $500 fine and 24 hours of community service. The special prosecutor's office in New Mexico announced the dismissal of involuntary manslaughter charges against Baldwin. Rust movie armorer Hannah Gutierrez-Reed waived her right for a preliminary hearing to determine whether or not the criminal charges against her would stand, thus allowing the trial against her to take place. A grand jury indicted Baldwin for involuntary manslaughter, and charges against him were refiled.

A jury found Gutierrez-Reed guilty of involuntary manslaughter, but not guilty of the additional charge of tampering with evidence. She was sentenced to 18 months in prison and was released after completing her sentence. The case against Alec Baldwin was dismissed with prejudice after the prosecution withheld evidence from the defense. Shortly after the criminal case against Baldwin was dismissed, lawyers for Hutchins' widower and parents vowed to seek civil litigation against the actor.

== Legacy ==
Following Hutchins's death, teachers and friends of hers at the American Film Institute established the Halyna Hutchins Memorial Scholarship Fund dedicated to supporting the education of female cinematographers. Hutchins's widower Matt Hutchins endorsed the project and asked for anyone wishing to honor her memory to donate to the fund.

Hutchins's death inspired calls for gun safety reform on film sets. Alexi Hawley, a producer of the American police procedural The Rookie, confirmed that all live guns on the show were to be replaced with Airsoft guns and CG flashes. Eric Kripke, showrunner of the American superhero TV series The Boys, similarly vowed to ban blanks and guns on his show.

Less than two hours after Hutchins's death, filmmaker Bandar Albuliwi, a former AFI Conservatory Directing classmate (class of 2010), proposed a ban on real guns on film and television sets. He created a petition for "Halyna's Law" on Change.org, which was signed by actors Olivia Wilde, Dwayne Johnson, Ariana DeBose, Julianne Moore, Anna Paquin, Elijah Wood, Lena Dunham and Ava DuVernay. Albuliwi has been working with state senators, including California State Senator Dave Cortese, to propose California legislation that would make it a felony to use real ammunition on film and television sets. Over 200 cinematographers called in an open letter to ban functional firearms on film sets.

The American Society of Cinematographers posthumously honored Hutchins's work as a cinematographer by awarding her honorary membership.

An authorized documentary Last Take: Rust and the Story of Halyna directed by her close friend and collaborator Rachel Mason, and executive produced by Matthew Hutchins, produced by Story Syndicate, was released in March 2025, on Hulu.

== Filmography ==
- World's Tallest Man (2006)
- Snowbound (2017)
- A Luv Tale: The Series (2018–2021)
- Darlin' (2019)
- Archenemy (2020)
- Blindfire (2020)
- To the New Girl (2020)
- The Mad Hatter (2021)
- Time Cut (2024)
- Rust (2024)

== See also ==
- List of film and television accidents
