= 32nd International Film Festival of the Art of Cinematography Camerimage =

2024 edition of film festival

EnergaCAMERIMAGE 2024
- Official poster by Marcin Wolski.
- Opening film: Blitz
- Closing film: Wicked
- Location: Toruń, Poland
- Founded: 1993
- Awards: Golden Frog: The Girl with the Needle – Michał Dymek; Silver Frog: The Brutalist – Lol Crawley; Bronze Frog: Emilia Pérez – Paul Guilhaume
- Festival date: 16–23 November 2024
- Website: camerimage.pl/en/

Camerimage
- 2025 2023

The 32nd International Film Festival of the Art of Cinematography Camerimage, also named EnergaCAMERIMAGE 2024 for its sponsorship from Polish power company Energa, took place from 16 to 23 November 2024 in Toruń, Poland, to recognize and reward the best in cinematography in film, television and music videos.

Steve McQueen's historical war drama Blitz will serve as the festival's opening film, while the first half of Jon M. Chu's two-part musical fantasy film Wicked will close the festival. Both films will be honoured with special awards for their director and production designer, respectively.

== Background ==
On 6 June 2024, Australian actress Cate Blanchett was announced as the jury president for the main competition. Later, on 19 September, Blitz was revealed as the opening film, while the following month, on 10 October, Wicked was announced as the closing film. The films competing in the main competition were revealed in groups of three, finally announcing the complete lineup on 30 October. The festival's poster was designer by Polish illustrator and graphic artist Marcin Wolski and was inspired by aurora borealis and Toruń's gothic architecture.

A special screening of Pablo Larraín's biographical film Maria, shot by Edward Lachman, will take place during the festival. Additionally, to celebrate the thirty year anniversary of American film studio Searchlight Pictures, six films from the studio will be screened. British filmmaker Steve McQueen is set to be awarded with the Outstanding Director Award. English production designer Nathan Crowley will receive the Special Award for Production Designer. Japanese actor Hiroyuki Sanada will receive the inaugural Best TV Series Performance award for his work in FX' historical drama series Shōgun, while Italian-American documentary filmmaker Gianfranco Rosi will be honoured with the Outstanding Achievements in Documentary Filmmaking award. American film editor and director William Goldenberg will receive the Film Editor award and will screen his directorial debut Unstoppable as a part of the special screenings.

=== Controversies ===
Among the special screenings, the festival announced the world premiere of Joel Souza's western film Rust. The decision to include the film within the festival was met with controversy, due to the shooting incident that took place during the movie's filming, where cinematographer Halyna Hutchins was fatally shot. Multiple cinematographers expressed their discontent with the film's premiere in the festival, with some deeming it "distasteful" and considering it not an appropriate way to honour Hutchins work.

In November 2024, the festival's director Marek Żydowicz wrote an op-ed for Cinematography World, where he expressed his thoughts on the changes in the industry, including the growing number of female directors and cinematographers. Some of Żydowicz comments were met with backlash from various cinematographers as well as the British Society of Cinematographers, who released an article where they expressed their disapproval, writing "we are disheartened and angered by your profoundly misogynistic comments and aggressive tone, which we view as symptomatic of a deep-rooted prejudice". Żydowicz issued an apology, describing the situation as a "misunderstanding", also writing "I assure you that we will prevent this kind of ambiguity from occurring in our communications in the future". Director Steve McQueen, who was a guest of honor for this year's festival and was set to receive a special award, announced he was no longer attending the festival. Similarly, director Coralie Fargeat and cinematographer Benjamin Kračun announced they were pulling their film The Substance out of the competition and were also not attending the festival.

== Juries ==
The jury members were as follows:

=== Main Competition ===
- Cate Blanchett, actress, producer, artistic director (jury president)
- Anthony Dod Mantle, cinematographer
- Jolanta Dylewska, cinematographer, documentary filmmaker
- Anna Higgs, producer, columnist
- Sandy Powell, costume designer
- Rodrigo Prieto, cinematographer
- Łukasz Żal, cinematographer

=== FIPRESCI Prize ===
- Victor López González, film critic
- Diana Martirosyan, film critic
- Paweł Mossakowski, film critic

=== Polish Films Competition ===
- Julie Huntsinger, manage, producer (jury president)
- César Charlone, cinematographer
- Florian Hoffmeister, cinematographer, director

=== Cinematographers' Debuts Competition ===
- Jarin Blaschke, cinematographer (jury president)
- Lawrence Grobel, writer, journalist, lecturer
- Michael Neubauer, cinematographer, manager

=== Directors' Debuts Competition ===
- Jan Roelfs, production designer (jury president)
- Amjad Al Rasheed, director, writer
- Johannes Kirklechner, cinematographer

=== TV Series Competition ===
- Salvatore Totino, cinematographer (jury president)
- Catherine Goldschmidt, cinematographer
- Larkin Seiple, cinematographer

=== Documentary Features Competition ===
- Lara Vilanova, cinematographer, colorist (jury president)
- Consuelo Althouse, cinematographer, artist, documentary filmmaker
- Jeff Gibbs, producer, director, writer, documentary filmmaker

=== Documentary Shorts Competition ===
- Maiti Gámez, director, cinematographer, documentary filmmaker (jury president)
- Kirstine Barfod, producer
- Stephen Lightbill, cinematographer

=== Music Videos Competition ===
- Alice Brooks, cinematographer (jury president)
- Greig Fraser, cinematographer
- Dawid Podsiadło, singer-songwriter, composer

=== Film and Art School Etudes Competition ===
- Shelly Johnson, cinematographer (jury president)
- Martin Gschlacht, cinematographer, producer
- Adam Habib, cinematographer, animation layout artist and camera lead

== Official selection ==
The films and projects selected for each announced section are as follows:

Highlighted title indicates section's Golden Frog winner.
Highlighted title indicates section's Silver Frog winner.
Highlighted title indicates section's Bronze Frog winner.

=== Main Competition ===
English Title	Original Title	Cinematographer(s)	Director(s)	Production countrie(s)
Blitz (opening film)		Yorick Le Saux	Steve McQueen	United Kingdom, United States
The Brutalist		Lol Crawley	Brady Corbet	United Kingdom
Cabrini		Gorka Gómez Andreu	Alejandro Monteverde	United States
Conclave		Stéphane Fontaine	Edward Berger	United Kingdom, United States
The Devil's Bath	Des Teufels Bad	Martin Gschlacht	Veronika Franz and Severin Fiala	Austria, Germany
Dune: Part Two		Greig Fraser	Denis Villeneuve	United States, Canada
Emilia Pérez		Paul Guilhaume	Jacques Audiard	France, United States
The Fire Inside		Rina Yang	Rachel Morrison	United States
The Girl with the Needle	Pigen med nålen	Michał Dymek	Magnus von Horn	Denmark, Poland, Sweden
Gladiator II		John Mathieson	Ridley Scott	United Kingdom, United States
Small Things like These		Frank van den Eeden	Tim Mielants	Ireland, Belgium, United States
Vermiglio		Mikhail Krichman	Maura Delpero	Italy, France, Belgium

=== Special Screenings ===
English Title	Original Title	Cinematographer(s)	Director(s)	Production countrie(s)
Special Screenings
The Battle of Monte Cassino	Czerwone maki	Arkadiusz Tomiak	Krzysztof Łukaszewicz	Poland
The Girl from the Wardrobe	Dziewczyna z szafy	Arkadiusz Tomiak	Bodo Kox	Poland
Here		Don Burgess	Robert Zemeckis	United States
Inside Out 2		Adam Habib, Jonathan Pytko	Kelsey Mann	United States
Maria		Edward Lachman	Pablo Larraín	Italy, Germany, United States
Rust (world premiere)		Halyna Hutchins, Bianca Cline	Joel Souza	United States
The Seasons	Sezony	Edgar de Poray	Michał Grzybowski	Poland
The Seed of the Sacred Fig	دانه‌ی انجیر معابد / Les Graines du figuier sauvage / Die Saat des heiligen Feigenbaums	Pooyan Aghababaei	Mohammad Rasoulof	Iran, France, Germany
September 5		Markus Förderer	Tim Fehlbaum	Germany
Unstoppable		Salvatore Totino	William Goldenberg	United States
Wicked (closing film)		Alice Brooks	Jon M. Chu	United States
Young Woman and the Sea		Óscar Faura	Joachim Rønning	United States, Hungary, Italy, United Kingdom, France
30 Years of Searchlight Pictures
Birdman or (The Unexpected Virtue of Ignorance)		Emmanuel Lubezki	Alejandro González Iñárritu	United States
The Favourite		Robbie Ryan	Yorgos Lanthimos	United Kingdom, Ireland, United States
The Grand Budapest Hotel		Robert Yeoman	Wes Anderson	United States, Germany
Nomadland		Joshua James Richards	Chloé Zhao	United States
Sideways		Phedon Papamichael	Alexander Payne	United States
Three Billboards Outside Ebbing, Missouri		Ben Davis	Martin McDonagh	United States, United Kingdom

=== Documentary Features Competition ===
English Title	Original Title	Cinematographer(s)	Director(s)	Production countrie(s)
Cyborg Generation		Martí Herrera	Miguel Morillo Vega	Spain
I Am the Creation of Fiction	Jestem postacią fikcyjną	Kacper Wójcicki	Arkadiusz Bartosiak	Poland
Koka		Aliaksandr Tsymbaliuk	Aliaksandr Tsymbaliuk	Poland
When Harmattan Blows		Marcin Sauter	Edyta Wróblewska	Poland
Mistress Dispeller		Elizabeth Lo	Elizabeth Lo	China, United States
Mother Vera		Cécile Embleton, Alys Tomlinson	Cécile Embleton, Alys Tomlinson	United Kingdom
Viktor		Olivier Sarbil	Olivier Sarbil	Ukraine, United States, Denmark

=== Director's Debuts Competition ===
English Title	Original Title	Cinematographer(s)	Director(s)	Production countrie(s)
Brief History of a Family	家庭简史	Jiahao Zhang	Jianjie Lin	China, France, Denmark, Qatar
Daddio		Phedon Papamichael	Christy Hall	United States
In the Land of Brothers	در سرزمین برادر	Farshad Mohammadi	Alireza Ghasemi, Raha Amirfazli	Iran, France, Netherlands
Los Frikis		Santiago Gonzalez	Tyler Nilson, Michael Schwartz	United States, Dominican Republic, Cuba
Nickel Boys		Jomo Fray	RaMell Ross	United States
Pedro Páramo		Rodrigo Prieto, Nico Aguilar	Rodrigo Prieto	Mexico
Red Path	Les enfants rouges	Wojciech Staroń	Lotfi Achour	Tunisia, France, Belgium, Poland
Santosh		Lennert Hillege	Sandhya Suri	United Kingdom, France, Germany
The Substance (Note: The film was withdrawn from competition by its director and cinematographer.)		Benjamin Kračun	Coralie Fargeat	United Kingdom, United States, France
Valentina or the Serenity	Valentina o la serenidad	Carlos Correa	Ángeles Cruz	Mexico
White Courage	Biała Odwaga	Marcin Koszałka	Marcin Koszałka	Poland
Who Do I Belong To	ماء العين / Là d'où l'on vient	Vincent Gonneville	Meryam Joobeur	Tunisia, France, Canada

=== Cinematographer's Debuts Competition ===
English Title	Original Title	Cinematographer(s)	Director(s)	Production countrie(s)
Banzo		Leandro Ferrão	Margarida Cardoso	Portugal, France, Netherlands
Brief History of a Family	家庭简史	Jiahao Zhang	Jianjie Lin	China, France, Denmark, Qatar
Edge of Summer		Rachel Clark	Lucy Cohen	United Kingdom
Los Frikis		Santiago Gonzalez	Tyler Nilson, Michael Schwartz	United States, Dominican Republic, Cuba
My Place Is Here	Il mio posto è qui	Emilio Maria Costa	Cristiano Bortone, Daniela Porto	Italy, Germany
The Queen's Orphans	As Órfãs da Rainha	Fernanda Tanaka	Elza Cataldo	Brazil
Tatami		Todd Martin	Zar Amir Ebrahimi, Guy Nattiv	United States, Georgia
Who Do I Belong To	ماء العين / Là d'où l'on vient	Vincent Gonneville	Meryam Joobeur	Tunisia, France, Canada

=== Music Videos Competition ===
Music video	Performing artist(s)	Cinematographer(s)	Director(s)	Production countrie(s)
"Overthinker"	Adonxs	Marián Ontko	Jiří Horenský	Czech Republic, Slovakia
"Little Foot Big Foot"	Childish Gambino	Larkin Seiple	Hiro Murai	United States
"Page"	Ed Sheeran	Maayane Bouhnik	Gordian Schrödter Null	Germany, United States
"Plora Aquí"	Ferran Palau	Marc Miró	Pablo Maestres	Spain
"Gangsta"	Free Nationals, A$AP Rocky & Anderson .Paak	Khalid Mohtaseb	François Rousselet	France
"Gamma"	Gesaffelstein	Łukasz Żal	Jordan Hemingway	France
"You & Me"	Goldband	Sam Vis	Casimir Mulder	Netherlands
"TK421"	Lenny Kravitz	Mykyta Kuzmenko	Tanu Muino	United States
"Wife Once"	Memory of Speke	Natasha Duursma	Fabien Frankel	United Kingdom
"313"	Residente	Pepe Ávila del Pino	René Pérez Joglar	United States
"I Took It Too Far"	Roi Keidar	Daria Geller, Yan Yasinsky	Daria Geller	Israel
"Please Please Please"	Sabrina Carpenter	Sean Price Williams	Bardia Zeinali	United States
"Fortnight"	Taylor Swift featuring Post Malone	Rodrigo Prieto	Taylor Swift	United States
"Nine Ball"	Zach Bryan	Larkin Seiple	Matthew Dillon Cohen	United States

=== TV Series Competition ===
Television series	Episode	Cinematographer(s)	Director(s)	Production countrie(s)
Baby Reindeer		Krzysztof Trojnar	Weronika Tofilska	United Kingdom
Becoming Karl Lagerfeld	"Mercenaire du prêt-à-porter"	Mélodie Preel	Jérôme Salle	France
Boy Swallows Universe	"Boy Smells Rat"	Shelley Farthing-Dawe	Bharat Nalluri	Australia
Fallout	"The End"	Stuart Dryburgh	Jonathan Nolan	United States
Herrhausen: The Banker and the Bomb	"The Lord of Money"	Florian Emmerich	Pia Strietmann	Germany, Belgium
A Murder at the End of the World	"Chapter 1: Homme Fatale"	Charlotte Bruus Christensen	Brit Marling	United States
The Penguin	"After Hours"	Darran Tiernan	Craig Zobel	United States
Ripley	"I A Hard Man to Find"	Robert Elswit	Steven Zaillian	United States
Shōgun	"Anjin"	Christopher Ross	Jonathan van Tulleken	United States
Sugar	"Olivia"	César Charlone	Fernando Meirelles	United States

=== Polish Films Competition ===
English Title	Original Title	Cinematographer(s)	Director(s)	Production countrie(s)
Kulej. All That Glitters Isn't Good	Kulej. Dwie strony medalu	Marian Prokop	Xawery Żuławski	Poland
Minghun		Kacper Fertacz	Jan P. Matuszyński	Poland
Scarborn	Kos	Piotr Sobociński Jr.	Paweł Maślona	Poland
Travel Essentials	Rzeczy Niezbędne	Tomasz Naumiuk	Kamila Tarabura	Poland, Germany
Under the Grey Sky	Pod Szarym Niebem	Krzysztof Trela	Mara Tamkovich	Poland
White Courage	Biała Odwaga	Marcin Koszałka	Marcin Koszałka	Poland
Wrooklyn Zoo		Adam Pietkiewicz	Krzysztof Skonieczny	Poland

=== Film and Art School Etudes Competition ===
English Title	Original Title	Cinematographer(s)	Director(s)	School	Production countrie(s)
Borrowed Hands	Manos ajenas	Melissa Nocetti	Adrián Monroy Molina	Centro de Capacitación Cinematográfica	Mexico
I Am Not There	Nie ma mnie	Daniel Le Hai	Daniel Le Hai	Krzysztof Kieślowski Film School	Poland
Breaking Glass		Valentin Lilgenau	Nicolás Bori	Film Academy Baden-Württemberg	Germany
Power of the Mirror	Macht des Spiegels	Benjamin F. Meyer	Ido Gotlib	Konrad Wolf Film University of Babelsberg	Germany
The Dam	Tama	Kacper Gawron	Giovanni Pierangeli	Łódź Film School	Poland
Like All the Others	Wie All Die Anderen	Oscar Pinaud	Max Bommas	Warsaw Film School	Poland
Eye of the Fen		Arttu Liimatta	Topi Raulo	Aalto University	Finland
Titans	Titaninnen	Lisa Jilg	Jannik Weiße	Film Academy Baden-Württemberg	Germany
How to Skin a Cheetah		Naoise Kettle	Meghan O'Shaughnessy	National Film School of Ireland	Ireland
Land of Dreams	Droomland	Stern Nordsiek	Bart Niewenweg	Utrecht School of the Arts	Netherlands
Lazarus	Lazar	Veselin Menkadzhiev	Orlin Menkadzhiev	National Academy for Theatre and Film Arts	Bulgaria
Photograph 1		Christopher Hudson	Oscar Simmons	National Film and Television School	United Kingdom
Remains		Natdanai Naksuwarn	Theja Rio	National Film and Television School	United Kingdom
Rouge	Rouge	Anton Belyakov	Jason Boussioux	École nationale supérieure Louis-Lumière	France
Replique		Audrey Biche	Max Olson	AFI Conservatory	United States
Siren Salon		Nicholas Buckwalter	Ella Grace Rodriguez	USC School of Cinematic Arts	United States
Want		Max Losson	Zalman Zuckerbraun	Florida State University College of Motion Picture Arts	United States
Orchid		Tin Brendel	Tin Brendel	Łódź Film School	Poland
Trains Passing By	Kugellager	Lena M. Riedler	Stella Artemisia Refle	University of Applied Sciences Salzburg	Austria
This Peculiar Day	Tento divný deň	Alex Miartuš	Emília Ondriašová	Academy of Performing Arts in Bratislava	Slovakia

=== Film and Art School Etudes Panorama ===
English Title	Original Title	Cinematographer(s)	Director(s)	School	Production countrie(s)
A Bull Calls	Un toro llama	Luis Hartmann	Nelson Algomeda	Deutsche Film- und Fernsehakademie Berlin	Germany, Venezuela
Cargo	Ładunek	Vincent Prochoroff	Tymoteusz Kałużewski	Łódź Film School	Poland
Papillon		Merlijn Willemsen	Helena Szoda-Woźniak, Merlijn Willemsen	Łódź Film School	Poland
Tiny Apocalypse	Maleńka apokalipsa	Daniel Tubylewicz	Izabela Zubrycka	Łódź Film School	Poland
Honey Bunny		Aleksandra Kamińska	Gracjana Piechula	Krzysztof Kieślowski Film School	Poland
Chiuita Piconera		Carlos Cuervo	Mey Montero	TAI School of Arts	Spain
Come Sit with Us	Ära ole uhke	Joosep Ivask	Elis Rumma	Baltic Film, Media, Arts and Communication School of Tallinn University	Estonia
Heir of the Galaxy	Als er ein Star war	Ferdinand Koestler	Daniel Holzberg	Vienna Film Academy	Austria
Just a Touch of Sugar	Trocha cukru	Vojtěch Kapounek	Timon W. Duda	Tomas Bata University in Zlín	Czech Republic
The Lumber Room		Luis Mayr Nin	Alejandro Mathé	Internationale Filmschule Köln	Germany
The Stolen Ride	Ein Fahrrad für Alicia	Alex Jaffar	Masha Mollenhauer	Hamburg Media School	Germany
Splinter		Lenn Lamster	Paul Scheufler	Konrad Wolf Film University of Babelsberg	Germany
A New Garden	Die lauteste Zeit	Leon Hörtrich	Lea Marie Lembke	Film Academy Baden-Württemberg	Germany
Resonance		Conrad Holzman	Asher Kaplan	Dodge College of Film and Media Arts	United States
Separation Season	Bie Li De Ji Jie	Tei Lee	I-Ju Lin	Film and TV School of the Academy of Performing Arts in Prague	Czech Republic, Taiwan

=== Documentary Shorts Competition ===
English Title	Original Title	Cinematographer(s)	Director(s)	Production countrie(s)
A Body Called Life		Fabian Kimoto	Spencer MacDonald	United States, Poland, Switzerland
Don Benjamín		Adro Molina	Iván Zahínos	Spain
Dust	Pył	Paweł Chorzępa	Paweł Chorzępa	Poland, Saudi Arabia
Eternal Father		Roxana Reiss	Ömer Sami	Denmark
Ready to Die		Christoph Bockisch	Basilio Maritano Sailer	Italy
Shotplayer		J. Daniel Zúñiga	Sam Shainberg	United States
Tropa		Pauwel Billiau	Niels Devlieghere	Belgium
We Beg to Differ		Daniel Sedgwick	Ruairi Bradley	Ireland, United Kingdom

=== Documentary Special Screenings ===
English Title	Original Title	Cinematographer(s)	Director(s)	Production countrie(s)
Afterwar		Troels N'koya-Jensen, Marek Septimus Wieser	Birgitte Stærmose	Denmark, Kosovo, Sweden, Finland
Agent of Happiness		Arun Bhattarai, Dorottya Zurbó	Arun Bhattarai, Dorottya Zurbó	Bhutan, Hungary
As the Tide Comes In	Før Stormen	Juan Palacios	Juan Palacios	Denmark
The Basement		Andriy Noha, Mikhail Volkov	Roman Blazhan	France, Ukraine
Echo of You	Ekko af kærlighed	Jacob Sofussen	Zara Zerny	Denmark
Life and Deaths of Max Linder	Vie et morts de Max Linder	Joo Joostberens	Edward Porembny	Poland
Look into My Eyes		Stephen Maing	Lana Wilson	United States
The Lost Legacy of Tony Gaudio		Gianluca Gattabria, Alessandro Nucci	Alessandro Nucci	Italy
New Kind of Wilderness		Silje Evensmo Jacobsen, Karine Fosser, Espen Gjermundrød, Line K. Lyngstadaas, Natalja Safronova, Fred Arne Wergeland	Silje Evensmo Jacobsen	Norway
The New Man	Omi Nobu	Arilson Almeida	Carlos Yuri Ceuninck	Cape Verde, Belgium, Sudan, Germany
No Other Land		Rachel Szor	Yuval Abraham, Basel Adra, Hamdan Ballal, Rachel Szor	Palestine, Norway
Per Forever		Tomasz Gezela, Łukasz Śliwa	Tomasz Gezela	Poland, Sweden
Sugarcane		Emily Kassie, Christopher LaMarca	Emily Kassie, Julian Brave NoiseCat	United States, Canada
Ula		Urszula Dudziak	Agnieszka Iwańska	Poland
The Wolves Always Come at Night		Michael Latham	Gabrielle Brady	Australia, Mongolia, Germany

=== World Cinema ===
English Title	Original Title	Cinematographer(s)	Director(s)	Production countrie(s)
Anora		Drew Daniels	Sean Baker	United States
Being Maria	Maria	Sébastien Buchmann	Jessica Palud	France
From Hilde, with Love	In Liebe, Eure Hilde	Judith Kaufmann	Andreas Dresen	Germany
Führer and Seducer	Führer und Verführer	Klaus Fuxjäger	Joachim Lang	Germany
Meeting with Pol Pot	Rendez-vous avec Pol Pot	Aymerick Pilarski	Rithy Panh	Cambodia, France, Turkey, Taiwan, Qatar
Münter & Kandinsky		Namche Okon	Marcus O. Rosenmüller	Germany
The Piano Lesson		Mike Gioulakis	Malcolm Washington	United States
Sew Torn		Sebastian Klinger	Freddy Macdonald	United States, Switzerland
Simona Kossak		Jakub Stolecki	Adrian Panek	Poland
The Summer Book		Sturla Brandth Grøvlen	Charlie McDowell	United States, Finland
The Village Next to Paradise		Mostafa El Kashef	Mo Harawe	France, Australia, Somalia

== Awards ==
=== Special awards ===
- Outstanding Director Award: Steve McQueen
- Special Award for Production Designer: Nathan Crowley
- Best TV Series Performance: Hiroyuki Sanada for Shōgun
- Outstanding Achievements in Documentary Filmmaking: Gianfranco Rosi
- Film Editor Award: William Goldenberg
