= Johnny Cash (disambiguation) =

Johnny Cash was an American singer and songwriter.

Johnny Cash may also refer to:

- "Johnny Cash" (Tracy Byrd song), 2004
- Johnnycash machine, a promotion used by Canada Trust for their ATMs in the 1980s and 1990s with the slogan "Why walk the line?"
- "Johnny Cash", a song by Yelawolf
- "Johnny Cash" (Lenny Kravitz song)

== See also ==
- John Cash (disambiguation)
- Johnny Cash discography, recordings by singer Johnny Cash
- The Johnny Cash Show (TV series), a television series with singer Johnny Cash
- The Johnny Cash Show (album), a 1970 album by Johnny Cash
