= Topshop (disambiguation) =

Topshop is a British clothes store, formerly known as Top Shop.

Topshop or Top Shop may also refer to:

- Topshop (workshop), a dwelling with work-rooms on the top floor, specific to the English Midlands
- Board Game Top Shop, a 1999 video game for the PlayStation and Sega Saturn
