= John Cash =

John Cash may refer to:

- Johnny Cash (1932–2003), singer
  - John R. Cash (album), a 1975 album by Johnny Cash
- John Cash (physician) (1936–2020), former president of the Royal College of Physicians of Edinburgh
- John Theodore Cash (1854–1936), British physician, professor of Materia Medica, Aberdeen University
- John Carter Cash (born 1970), American country musician and son of Johnny Cash
- John Cash (American football) (born 1934), American football player
- John Cash (1822–1880), British manufacturer, co-founder of J. & J. Cash Ltd.
