= Here to Love =

Single by Lenny Kravitz

from the album Raise Vibration
- Released: November 21, 2019
- Length: 4:42
- Label: Roxie; BMG
- Songwriter(s): Lenny Kravitz
- Producer(s): Lenny Kravitz

Lenny Kravitz singles chronology
"Johnny Cash" (2019)	"Here to Love" (2019)	"Ride" (2020)

Music video
- "Here to Love" on YouTube

"Here to Love" is a song recorded by American singer and songwriter Lenny Kravitz from his 11th studio album Raise Vibration. It was released as the album's fifth single on November 21, 2019. The music video for the song was directed by Mathieu Bitton.

== Reception ==
Uproxx described "Here To Love" as an "overt political anthem" and "the earnest piano ballad", characterizing some of the lyrics as "mawkish" and comparing Kravitz's performance to a "non-satirical version of Aldous Snow".

== Music video and legacy ==
Kravitz partnered with the UN Human Rights Office to fight racism and to promote equality worldwide; "Here to Love" is used as the theme song to support the campaign #FightRacism in 2020 and beyond. The song marks Kravitz's directorial debut—he created the black-and-white video himself, showing various people of different races, genders, religions, backgrounds, who first stand alone and then united—as an illustration of human diversity. Kravitz also explained, "The 'Here to Love' video is a procession of humanity, showing our beautiful differences while celebrating our oneness."
