= Scream (Michael Jackson album) =

Compilation album by Michael Jackson
- Released: September 29, 2017
- Recorded: 1980–2014
- Length: 69:25
- Labels: MJJ; Epic; Legacy; Sony
- Producers: Michael Jackson; The Jacksons; Greg Phillinganes; Curtis Anthony Nolen; Rockwell; Quincy Jones; Jackie Jackson; Teddy Riley; Jimmy Jam & Terry Lewis; Janet Jackson; Rodney "Darkchild" Jerkins

Michael Jackson chronology
Xscape (2014)	Scream (2017)	Thriller 40 (2022)

Singles from Scream
- 1. "Blood on the Dance Floor x Dangerous (The White Panda Mash-Up)" Released: September 6, 2017

Scream is a compilation album by American singer-songwriter Michael Jackson, released on September 29, 2017. The album compiles songs around a Halloween theme. It is the eleventh release by Sony and/or Motown since Jackson's death on June 25, 2009.

== Background ==
A 17-second teaser was released on Michael Jackson's official Facebook page and YouTube Vevo page on September 6, 2017, just after a 3D version of the 1983 "Thriller" short film premiered in Venice, Italy. Later that day, the album was classified as a "Halloween album" with mysterious theme songs. The track "Blood on the Dance Floor x Dangerous (The White Panda Mash-up)" was released digitally on September 6, 2017. Another track, "Thriller (Steve Aoki Midnight Hour Remix)" was released digitally on September 29, but this remix was not included on the album.

== Critical reception ==
Professional ratings
Review scores
Source	Rating
AllMusic	2.5/5 stars
Consequence of Sound	B-
Knoxnews	3.5/5 stars

The album received generally mixed reviews. Some reviews criticized the album's tracklist. Joel Garcia from Evo News highlighted that few songs actually are Halloween-related, while other songs ("Leave Me Alone", "Scream", "Unbreakable", among others) have little to nothing to do with the theme of the album: "[The rest of the songs] are instead about either failed relationships or Jackson’s thoughts on the media." Andy Kellman from AllMusic described the album as a "trivial gimmick" and wrote that the majority of the track list was "forced into the program, chosen for tenuous, superficial reasons" like song titles. Kellman called the mash-up by The White Panda "forgettable".

Chuck Campbell from Knoxnews praised the hits included on Scream but called the included album cuts from Dangerous and Invincible "derivative and lazy". In contrast, Dan Weiss from Consequence of Sound praised the album's inclusion of lesser known songs and felt that it was cohesive despite also describing it as a "cash-grab".

== Commercial performance ==
It debuted at number 28 in France, selling 3,300 units. In the United States, it debuted with 14,000 units, including 11,000 from pure album sales, in its first week of release, charting at number 33 on the Billboard 200.

== Track listing ==
No.	Title	Writer(s)	Album	Length
1.	"This Place Hotel" (a.k.a. "Heartbreak Hotel") (performed by The Jacksons)	Michael Jackson	Triumph	5:43
2.	"Thriller"	Rod Temperton	Thriller	5:58
3.	"Blood on the Dance Floor"	M. Jackson; Teddy Riley	Blood on the Dance Floor: HIStory in the Mix	4:13
4.	"Somebody's Watching Me" (performed by Rockwell)	Kennedy Gordy	Somebody's Watching Me	3:57
5.	"Dirty Diana"	M. Jackson	Bad	4:40
6.	"Torture" (performed by The Jacksons)	Jackie Jackson; Kathleen Wakefield	Victory	4:53
7.	"Leave Me Alone"	M. Jackson	Bad	4:39
8.	"Scream" (duet with Janet Jackson)	M. Jackson; Janet Jackson; James Harris III; Terry Lewis	HIStory: Past, Present and Future, Book I	4:37
9.	"Dangerous"	M. Jackson; Bill Bottrell; Riley	Dangerous	6:58
10.	"Unbreakable" (featuring The Notorious B.I.G.)	M. Jackson; Rodney Jerkins; Fred Jerkins III; LaShawn Daniels; Nora Payne; Robert Smith; Christopher Wallace	Invincible	6:25
11.	"Xscape"	M. Jackson; R. Jerkins; F. Jerkins; Daniels	Xscape	4:05
12.	"Threatened"	M. Jackson; R. Jerkins; F. Jerkins; Daniels	Invincible	4:19
13.	"Ghosts"	M. Jackson; Riley	Blood on the Dance Floor: HIStory in the Mix	5:13
14.	"Blood on the Dance Floor x Dangerous (The White Panda Mash-Up)"	M. Jackson; Bottrell; Riley; Harris; Lewis		3:38
Total length:				69:25

- Track 14 contains vocals and musical elements from "Blood on the Dance Floor", "Dangerous", "This Place Hotel", "Is It Scary" and "Leave Me Alone".

== Charts ==
=== Weekly ===
Weekly chart performance for Scream
Chart (2017)	Peak position
Australian Albums (ARIA)	14
Austrian Albums (Ö3 Austria)	50
Belgian Albums (Ultratop Flanders)	9
Belgian Albums (Ultratop Wallonia)	18
Canadian Albums (Billboard)	69
Czech Albums (ČNS IFPI)	35
Dutch Albums (Album Top 100)	30
Finnish Albums (Suomen virallinen lista)	37
French Albums (SNEP)	16
German Albums (Offizielle Top 100)	22
Irish Albums (IRMA)	45
Italian Albums (FIMI)	38
Japanese Hot Albums (Billboard Japan)	57
Mexican Albums (AMPROFON)	20
New Zealand Heatseeker Albums (RMNZ)	1
Portuguese Albums (AFP)	23
Scottish Albums (Official Charts)	16
Spanish Albums (Promusicae)	9
Swiss Albums (Schweizer Hitparade)	34
UK Albums (Official Charts)	9
US Billboard 200	33
US Top R&B/Hip-Hop Albums (Billboard)	20

=== Year-end ===
2017 year-end chart performance for Scream
Chart (2017)	Position
Belgian Albums (Ultratop Flanders)	148
Belgian Albums (Ultratop Wallonia)	177

== Certifications ==
Certifications for Scream
Region	Certification	Certified units/sales
United Kingdom (BPI)	Silver	60,000^{‡}
^{‡} Sales+streaming figures based on certification alone.
