= Human (Lenny Kravitz song) =

Single by Lenny Kravitz

from the album Blue Electric Light
- Released: March 22, 2024
- Length: 4:27 (album version); 3:30 (radio version/music video)
- Label: Roxie; BMG
- Songwriter: Lenny Kravitz
- Producer: Lenny Kravitz

Lenny Kravitz singles chronology
"I Believe in Love Again" (2023)	"Human" (2024)	"Paralyzed" (2024)

Music video
- "Human" on YouTube

"Human" is a song by American singer Lenny Kravitz, from his twelfth studio album, Blue Electric Light. The song was released as the album's second single on 22 March 2024.

== Background ==
Kravitz debuted the new single during the March 20 episode of NBC's The Tonight Show.

In his interview for American Songwriter Kravitz said: "You know, it’s about us as spiritual beings living this human existence and what that is. When you stop trying to please everybody and do what people are trying to get you to do." Kravitz also explained to Essence, "As Spring opens up, it’s an anthem to just run out in the street and just start dancing. It just has that feeling. That’s the statement of celebrating this human experience that we’re having as spiritual beings and being authentic to who God created us to be."

Lenny Kravitz's guitarist and engineer Craig Ross played the guitar solo on this track. Kravitz himself played all the other instruments.

== Music video ==
The song's music video was released on the same day, March 22, 2024, via YouTube. The music video was released on April 5, 2024, directed by Joseph Kahn. The music video won in the Best Rock Video category at the 2024 MTV Video Music Awards.

== Reception ==
Jacob Uitti of American Songwriter wrote that "Human" opens "with a rattle. And either by choice or by divine intervention (or maybe both), it's the perfect opening. The rattle, if considering the new track philosophically, can be thought of as a soul-stirring awakening. The jolt of bones, the spark of a spirit inside. A rattle, too, is almost always a person's first toy, doubling also as our first musical instrument." Steve Baltin of Forbes commented, "The song is a superb microcosm of the album, as it showcases the juxtaposition of Kravitz's incredibly thoughtful lyrics and the catchy beat that are the hallmarks of this album."

== Charts ==
Chart performance for "Human"
Chart (2024)	Peak position
France Airplay (SNEP)	58
Iceland (Tónlistinn)	29
Italy (EarOne Airplay)	24
Japan Hot Overseas (Billboard Japan)	13
San Marino (SMRRTV Top 50)	29
US Adult Contemporary (Billboard)	22
US Adult Pop Airplay (Billboard)	21

== Release history ==
List of release dates, showing region, release format, catalog, and label
Region	Date	Format	Label	Ref.
Italy	March 22, 2024	Radio airplay	BMG	
