= Low (Lenny Kravitz song) =

Single by Lenny Kravitz

from the album Raise Vibration
- Released: May 25, 2018
- Length: 5:19
- Label: Roxie; BMG
- Songwriter: Lenny Kravitz
- Producer: Lenny Kravitz

Lenny Kravitz singles chronology
"It's Enough!" (2018)	"Low" (2018)	"5 More Days 'Til Summer" (2018)

Michael Jackson singles chronology
"Blood on the Dance Floor x Dangerous" (2017)	"Low" (2018)	"Don't Matter to Me" (2018)

Music video
- "Low" on YouTube

"Low" is a song by American singer Lenny Kravitz, from his eleventh studio album Raise Vibration, featuring posthumous guest vocals from Michael Jackson. It was released as the album's second single on May 25, 2018.

== Background ==
The song explores, according to journalist Allison Kugel, "the perils of his [Kravitz] near-mythical sensuality with intonations alluding to his past intimate relationships". For this track Kravitz took inspiration from Michael Jackson with whom he produced the song "(I Can't Make It) Another Day" in 1999, which was later included in Jackson's first posthumous album Michael. "Low" also contains some vocal parts by Jackson. Kravitz explains, "A lot of people say: 'Oh, you’re going with that Michael Jackson impersonation.' No, that's him."

== Video ==
The video was released on 5 June 2018 on the singer's YouTube channel. The video features images of Kravitz's family, dating back to the 1960s. On 11 July the second video was released, directed by French director and photographer Jean-Baptiste Mondino, where Kravitz sings on a rotating platform and is later joined by drummer Jas Kayser who plays while singing along to the song.

== Reception ==
"Low" became Kravitz's first song to peak #1 on Billboard's Dance Club Songs, thanks to several remixes by David Guetta, Tom Stephan, and Junior Black. Madison Desler of Paste wrote, "Worth the price of admission is 'Low', a funk-tinged easy-groover about keeping a relationship grounded. It's sexy, it's smooth, and it's dance floor ready. And yes, that's Michael Jackson on backing vocals—maybe one of the most absolute stamps of cool there is."

== Charts ==
=== Weekly charts ===
Chart (2018)	Peak position
Belgium (Ultratip Bubbling Under Flanders)	8
Belgium (Ultratop 50 Wallonia)	6
Croatia Airplay (HRT)	34
France (SNEP)	147
Germany (GfK)	61
Iceland (RÚV)	7
Italy (FIMI)	53
Scottish Singles Sales (Official Charts)	99
Slovenia (SloTop50)	38
Switzerland (Schweizer Hitparade)	69
US Dance Club Songs (Billboard)	1

=== Year-end charts ===
Chart (2018)	Position
Belgium (Ultratop Wallonia)	36
US Dance Club Songs (Billboard)	49

== Certifications ==
Region	Certification	Certified units/sales
Brazil (Pro-Música Brasil)	Gold	20,000^{‡}
Italy (FIMI)	Gold	25,000^{‡}
^{‡} Sales+streaming figures based on certification alone.
