= White Panda =

American music group

Background information
- Genres: EDM
- Occupations: DJ; remixer; record producer
- Years active: 2009–present
- Members: Tom Evans (Procrast)
- Past members: Dan Griffith (DJ Griffi)

White Panda, formerly styled The White Panda, is an American music group, best known for remixing and releasing mashups.

== Formation and early career ==
White Panda was formed when two friends, both from Los Altos, California, began producing and performing together as "The White Panda" after creating music on their own at separate colleges. The White Panda were part of a second generation of mashup artists gaining popularity on college campuses and music-streaming websites.

They began a national tour in July 2011, visiting the University of Delaware, and sharing the stage with Flo Rida, Wale, Sam Adams, and True 2 Life Music at Cornell University. Their live shows featuring black and white suits, with glowing LED panda masks. They continued touring, particularly at universities, such as Swarthmore College, where they were the student choice to headline the 2014 Large Scale Event (LSE).

They were a mainstay of the Firefly Music Festival's dance scene by 2016, having played The Woodlands dance music stage more than any other group at that time.

White Panda released the single "Blood on the Dance Floor x Dangerous" on September 6, 2017, in support of the Michael Jackson compilation album Scream, which charted at 47 and peaked at 41 on Billboard's Dance Songs Chart.

== Later work ==
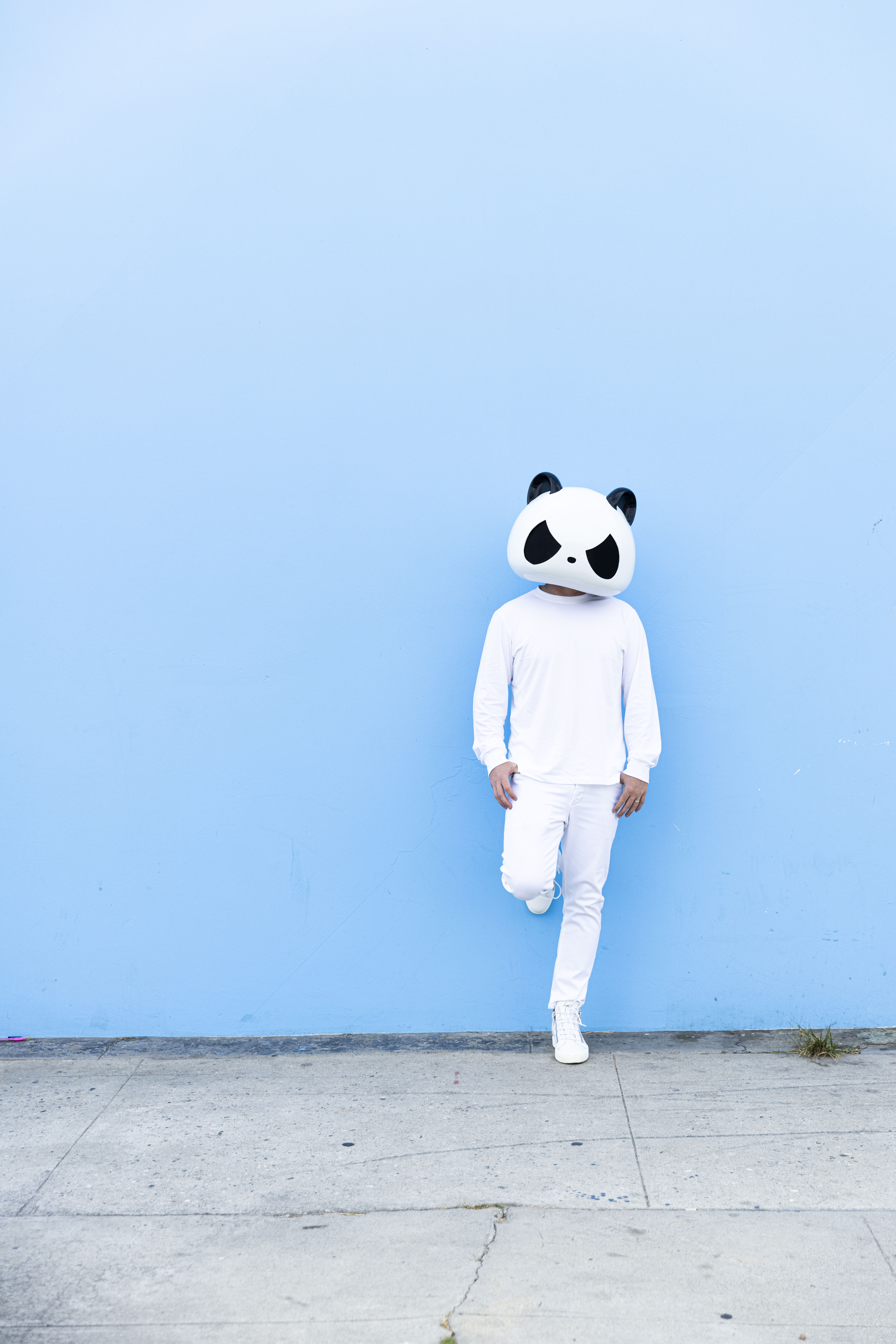
White Panda as a solo act

In 2018, it was announced on their Facebook page that White Panda was continuing as a solo act.

== Discography ==
White Panda released the albums Versus in 2009, Rematch in 2010, Pandamonium in 2011, Bambooyah! in 2012, Bearly Legal in 2013, The Pawprint in 2015, and Nightcub in 2021.
