= Sebastian Klinger =

Swiss cinematographer

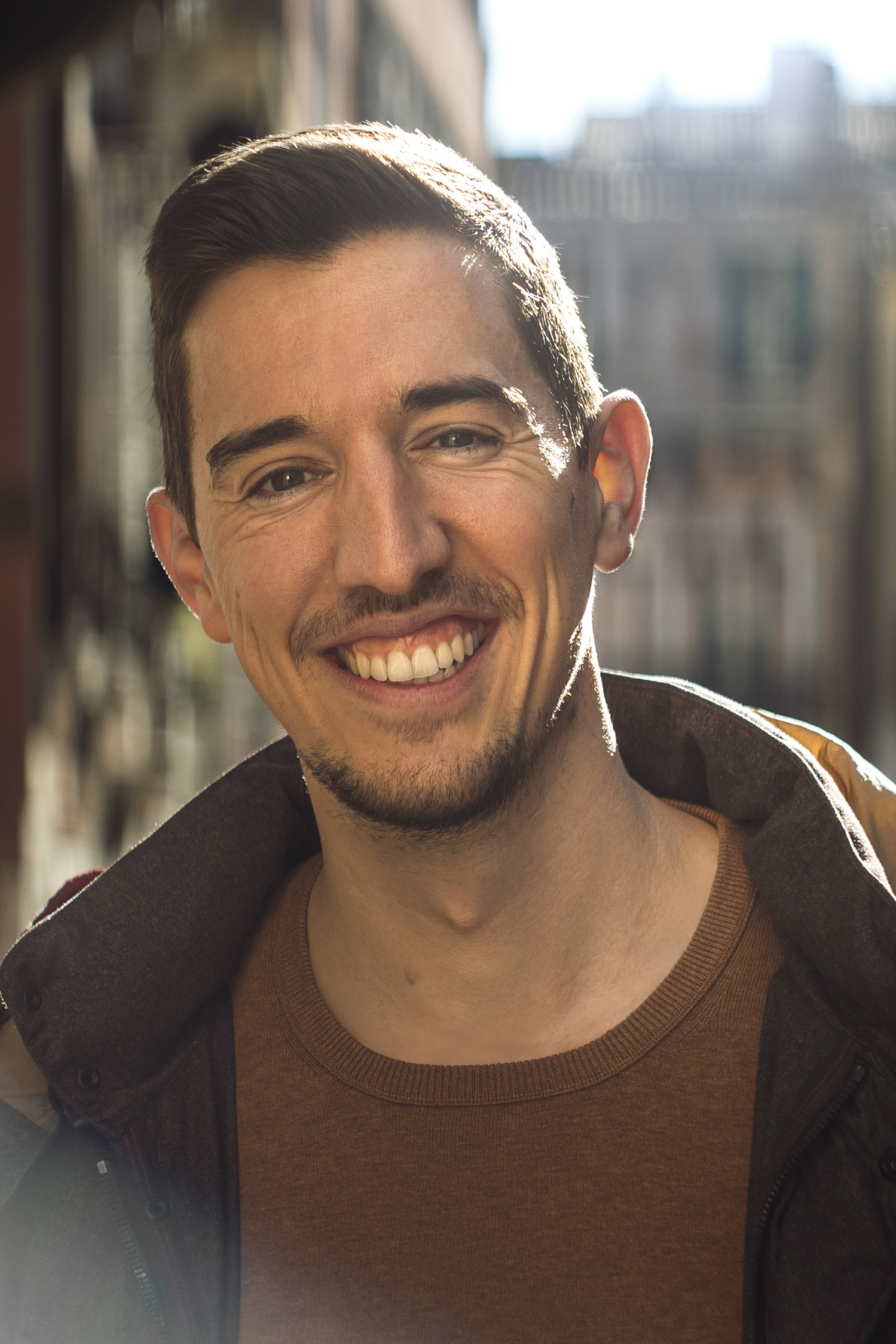
- Klinger in 2024
- Born: October 28, 1993 (age 32); Zürich, Switzerland
- Occupations: Cinematographer, Producer
- Years active: 2016–present
- Website: sebklinger.com

Sebastian Klinger (born October 28, 1993) is a Swiss cinematographer and producer. His critically acclaimed feature film Sew Torn premiered at South by Southwest Film Festival and screened on the Piazza Grande at Locarno Film Festival and Camerimage in 2024.

== Life and career ==
After graduating from high school, Klinger completed his education at the University of Applied Sciences of the Grisons with the feature film Zoe under the guidance of Emmy winner Heiner Gatzemeier and Oscar-nominated cinematographer Peter Indergand, SCS. Since then, Klinger has worked internationally as a freelance cinematographer. With the winner of the Student Academy Award, Freddy Macdonald, he shot the feature Sew Torn, which premiered at the South by Southwest Film Festival 2024, then headlined the Piazza Grande at the Locarno Film Festival and was selected at Camerimage. The feature film had a theatrical release in May 2025, and became available to stream on Netflix in December 2025.

The film is based on a 2019 short film of the same name, also shot by Klinger, which was acquired by Searchlight Pictures and qualified for an Academy Award.

Klinger enjoys a long-standing collaboration with Macdonald that has spanned numerous projects, including the award-winning short film The Father of Art and three music videos for three-time Grammy winner Fantastic Negrito. Klinger's work has been recognized with the White Dolphin at the Cannes Corporate Media & TV Awards and earned him a place in the American Society of Cinematographers' ASC Vision Mentorship Program. In addition to his work as a cinematographer, Klinger also works as a producer and regularly collaborates with the Swiss production company ORISONO, among others.

== Selected filmography ==
Year	Title	Director	Notes
2018	The Father of Art (short film)	Freddy Macdonald	
2018	Zoe (feature film)	Johannes Thüring	first feature
2019	Sew Torn (short film)	Freddy Macdonald	executive produced by Peter Spears
2020	Maiensäss (short film)	Sven Schnyder	also as producer
2021	Paxmal (short film)	Sven Schnyder	also as producer
2024	Sew Torn (feature film)	Freddy Macdonald	also as producer

== Accolades ==
Year	Award	Category	Title	Result	Ref.
2018	Beverly Hills Film Festival	Best Student Film	The Father of Art	Won	
2021	Jaipur International Film Festival	Best Political Film	Maiensäss	Won	
2021	Flickers' Rhode Island International Film Festival	LGBTQ	Paxmal	Nominated	
2024	South By Southwest Film Festival	Visions	Sew Torn	Nominated	
2024	Locarno Film Festival	Piazza Grande	Sew Torn	Nominated	
2024	Camerimage	Contemporary World Cinema	Sew Torn	Nominated	
