= True 2 Life Music =

American hip hop group

- Also known as: True 2 Life; T2L; T2L Nation
- Origin: Ithaca, New York, U.S.
- Genres: Hip Hop; jazz rap; R&B
- Members: Concise; K.Words; Slangston Hughes (Slang Hughes)

True 2 Life Music is an American production company, independent record label and creative collective founded at Cornell University, an Ivy League University located in Ithaca, New York. True 2 Life Music is based in Brooklyn, New York, United States.

True 2 Life Music is notable for combining influences from the Golden age of hip hop with a sound that is progressive, experimental, and innovative. Utilizing varied subject matter and live instrumentation combined with eclectic sampling and production.

The True 2 Life sound has been described as, "a sound that has no region." True 2 Life's self-produced cascading, sample heavy boardwork is poignant, boisterous, unstoppable, cohesive, and powerful. On April 13, 2012, in their review of the album "Every Dream Has A Price" and feature of the music video for "Daily Math", MTV Iggy reported that "the group bridged the gaps between eras with 90's beats and 21st century flow," "[True 2 Life Music] combines the best flavors of two generations."

Since its inception, True 2 Life Music's style and alternative aesthetic deviated from the then-dominant "gangsta" persona in hip hop. As a result, True 2 Life has fought off the predetermined judgement of others as they sought to "break the mold" by representing a dynamic representation of the black male identity and experience in America. Being a self-contained, self-produced unit, True 2 Life's early sound was described as "jazz fusion, drawing on influences such as DJ Premier, Kanye West, Talib Kweli, Common, A Tribe Called Quest, The Roots, Nas and Freeway.

== Career ==
On June 18, 2012 True 2 Life Music was featured in XXL’s "The Break" where they stated their desire to remain true to themselves and create progressive musical and visual experiences for the people to relate to and be inspired by.

True 2 Life Music has independently toured nationally and shared the stage with Grammy Winners T-Pain, Lupe Fiasco, and popular artists such as Fabolous, J. Cole, Wiz Khalifa, Wale, Yelawolf, The Cool Kids, and DJ's such as The White Panda

True 2 Life Music is a self-contained production unit, handling all of the production on their previous albums. Though primarily focused on creating complete bodies of work, they have produced for artists such as Troy Ave and Jamal "Gravy" Woolard.

== Recognition ==
On April 4, 2012, True 2 Life Music released the entirely self-produced album "Every Dream Has A Price" a 10-song album that touched on the cost of success.

In June 2012, True 2 Life Music was one of the artists featured in XXL's The Break.

T2L is known for both their dynamic live performance as well as their cutting edge visuals, such as the MTV featured, self-directed and produced "Monday 2 Sunday".

In November 2011, their music video for "Daily Math" was selected by director Rik Cordero to be featured in the "Director's Hub", a web series that profiles the best and brightest up and coming stars of the internet directing world. The MTV IGGY featured music video,"Daily Math", was described as "DIY out-of-control dance video.".

The high energy video for "Daily Math" was filmed live on location at various locations throughout New York City and features scenes filmed amidst the Occupy Wall Street protest movement.

True 2 Life Music has garnered coverage by coverage from MTV, MTV Iggy, Complex Magazine, VIBE, Okayplayer, Allhiphop, 2Dopeboyz, The Source, and XXL. They have also appeared on major radio shows such as Sirius XM Radio’s Shade 45 and WZMX Hot 93.7 with Jenny Boom Boom.

== Acting career ==
True 2 Life Music had small roles In the 2009 Fox Searchlight Pictures biopic Notorious about the New York-born rapper The Notorious B.I.G. In the George Tillman Jr. directed film, Concise played the role of "Gutta" in the group Junior Mafia which was a Bedford-Stuyvesant based rap group formed and mentored by New York rapper, The Notorious B.I.G. K. Words and Slangston Hughes had smaller cameo acting roles. While on set of "Notorious", True 2 Life caught the attention of director, J. Needleman and would go on to subsequently collaborate on two music videos for songs on their collection of original music inspired by The Notorious B.I.G. entitled "Larger Than Life." True 2 Life Music would later star in and film a television pilot for a 30-minute single-camera scripted comedy series set in modern-day Brooklyn, NYC, following the trials and tribulations of a hip hop crew known as Fort Knox, as they climb the bumpy ladder to success. Playing their music on the set of "Notorious" would lead to word of their production talent spreading. Music Producer and member of Sean "Diddy" Combs' producing team: The Hitmen, Derick "D-Dot" Angelettie would invite True 2 Life to Daddy's House Recording Studio to collaborate on production.

== Discography ==
=== Albums ===
•  Concise & K. Words present: True 2 Life Music (2006)
•  Image Iz Everything (2007)
•  Live. Love. Listen Volume 1 (2008)
•  Live Love LIsten. Volume 2 (2009)
•  Larger Than Life (2009)
•  Larger Than Life Expansion Pack (2009)
•  Money Never Sleeps (2011)
•  Every Dream Has A Price (2012)
•  BGND/Black Gods Never Die a Story by True 2 Life Music (2013)
•  Remember The Time ( TBA)
