= Blood on the Dance Floor x Dangerous =

"Blood on the Dance Floor x Dangerous (The White Panda Mash-Up)"

Single by Michael Jackson

from the album Scream
- Released: September 6, 2017
- Length: 3:38 (album version); 6:26 (extended version)
- Label: Epic
- Songwriter(s): Michael Jackson; Bill Bottrell; Teddy Riley; James Harris III; Terry Lewis
- Producer(s): The White Panda

Michael Jackson singles chronology
"A Place with No Name" (2014)	"Blood on the Dance Floor x Dangerous (The White Panda Mash-Up)" (2017)	"Low" (2018)

Music video
- "Blood on the Dance Floor x Dangerous" on YouTube

"Blood on the Dance Floor x Dangerous (The White Panda Mash-Up)", often shortened to just "Blood on the Dance Floor x Dangerous", is a song by American singer and recording artist Michael Jackson. A mashup by the White Panda, it was released digitally on September 6, 2017 in promotion of Jackson's posthumous compilation album Scream.

== Background and release ==
In September 2017, Sony Music Entertainment announced that a compilation album entitled Scream would be released on September 29, 2017.

On September 6, 2017, for the promotion of the album, the track "Blood on the Dance Floor x Dangerous (The White Panda Mash-up)" premiered via Shazam worldwide. On the same day, it became the lead single for the album as a digital download at iTunes and Amazon. It was also released on the majority Chinese music streaming platforms Tencent and NetEase Music the same day.

It is a mash-up composed of five songs by Michael and the Jacksons—"Blood on the Dance Floor", "Dangerous", "This Place Hotel", "Leave Me Alone" and "Is It Scary" remixed by dance music duo White Panda.

== Critical reception ==
Ben Beaumont-Thomas from The Guardian said the song was "fascinatingly awkward" in its presentation.

== Commercial performance ==
The song did not appear in majority music charts in 2017. In December 2017, it was released for club play in the United States, The song debuted at number 47 on the Billboard Dance Club Songs chart on February 10, 2018, and became the 25th song by Jackson to appear on the chart.

== Track listing ==
Digital single
No.	Title	Length
1.	"Blood on the Dance Floor x Dangerous (The White Panda Mash-up)"	3:39
2.	"Blood on the Dance Floor x Dangerous (The White Panda Extended Mash-up)"	6:26

== Charts ==
Chart (2018)	Peak position
US Dance Club Songs (Billboard)	41

== See also ==
- "Earth Song", a CD single which contained a similar megamix.
