= Raise Vibration =

Studio album by Lenny Kravitz
- Released: September 7, 2018
- Studios: Gregory Town Sound, Eleuthera, Bahamas
- Genre: Rock
- Length: 64:35
- Labels: Roxie, BMG
- Producer: Lenny Kravitz

Lenny Kravitz chronology
Strut (2014)	Raise Vibration (2018)	Blue Electric Light (2024)

Singles from Raise Vibration
- 1. "It's Enough!" Released: May 11, 2018; 2. "Low" Released: May 25, 2018; 3. "5 More Days 'Til Summer" Released: July 24, 2018; 4. "Johnny Cash" Released: March 1, 2019; 5. "Here to Love" Released: November 21, 2019; 6. "Ride" Released: May 29, 2020; 7. "Raise Vibration" Released: June 25, 2021

Professional ratings
Aggregate scores
Source	Rating
Metacritic	62/100
Review scores
Source	Rating
AllMusic	4/5 stars
Classic Pop	4/5 stars
Classic Rock	7/10
Evening Standard	3/5 stars
laut.de	4/5 stars
Mojo	2/5 stars
Paste	7.2/10
Q	3/5 stars
Rolling Stone	3/5 stars
Slant Magazine	2.5/5 stars

Raise Vibration is the eleventh studio album by American rock musician Lenny Kravitz. It was released on Roxie Records via BMG Rights Management on September 7, 2018, and produced seven singles.

== Background ==
Kravitz explained that he struggled with serious writer’s block while trying to focus on this album. Raise Vibration is a socially-conscious album, containing twelve compositions that address multiple issues plaguing the world. As on most of his other studio recordings, Kravitz plays most of the instruments himself, with longtime guitarist Craig Ross and keyboardist/orchestrator David Baron being the only collaborators (other than string and horn players). The album has produced four singles. "It's Enough!" is a song against corporate greed, political corruption, and racism. The follow-up single "Low" explores the perils of his near-mythical sensuality with intonations alluding to his past intimate relationships. The song "Low" was released as a single and a video approximately six weeks before the album. It contains vocal extracts from Michael Jackson.

The song "5 More Days 'Til Summer" was released as the third single and is much more upbeat than "Low" and "It’s Enough!". The song "Johnny Cash", a mix of psychedelic country and western, was released as the fourth single to be a tribute to American legendary country singer Johnny Cash, who died on September 12, 2003. Kravitz claims to have met Cash and his wife June Carter in 1995 when he was flatmates with Rick Rubin in Los Angeles, when he encountered Cash and his wife after being called that his mother had died. He recalls the memory in the song, and pays respect to the legend.

The album was recorded in Eleuthera island, Bahamas, of which Kravitz is a long time resident—he has previously stated that many of his songs were written while staying there.

== Reception ==
At Metacritic, which assigns a weighted mean rating out of 100 to reviews from mainstream critics, the album received an average score of 62, based on six reviews, which indicates "generally favorable reviews".

Madison Desler of Paste Magazine commented "So here we are at the end of this album, left with the question, after 30 years, where does he stand? Is Lenny Kravitz a low-key legend? Let’s say yes—French people love him, he’s been praised and pilloried in equal measure and he has some tried-and-true bangers. Is Lenny Kravitz still cool? Not sure. This album is sending mixed messages. Will the giant scarf always be a thing? Most definitely".

Kory Grow of Rolling Stone stated "Lenny Kravitz gets angry in only the most Lenny Kravitz way possible: with a high-pitched “hoooo,” some funky bass and his typically über-passionate vocal delivery. Nearly every track on his 11th album, Raise Vibration – at least those that aren’t his signature love songs – seems like he intended it to be an anthem for resistance in the Trump era... Mostly, it’s Kravitz’s signature blend of rock and soul, love and social outrage, only this time with a little more bite". Zachary Hoskins of Slant Magazine wrote "Raise Vibration's more serious shortcoming is its lyrics, which stumble whenever they reach for grand proclamations on the state of the world". Mark Kennedy of Chicago Sun-Times wrote "Still, Kravitz has given us enough meaty tunes to last us until he’s ready again to come ride to our rescue".

== Track listing ==
All tracks are written by Lenny Kravitz, except 3 and 10 written by Lenny Kravitz and Craig Ross

Raise Vibration track listing
No.	Title	Length
1.	"We Can Get It All Together"	4:40
2.	"Low"	5:19
3.	"Who Really Are the Monsters?"	5:19
4.	"Raise Vibration"	5:27
5.	"Johnny Cash"	6:18
6.	"Here to Love"	4:42
7.	"It's Enough!"	7:55
8.	"5 More Days 'Til Summer"	4:02
9.	"The Majesty of Love"	5:49
10.	"Gold Dust"	5:08
11.	"Ride"	5:58
12.	"I'll Always Be Inside Your Soul"	3:58
Total length:		64:35

Japanese edition bonus track
No.	Title	Length
13.	"Low" (David Guetta Remix)	3:30
Total length:		68:13

== Personnel ==
=== Musicians ===
- Lenny Kravitz – vocals, composition, writing, arrangement
- Craig Ross – electric guitar, acoustic guitar, hand claps, moog, drum programming
- Michael Jackson – posthumous vocals on "Low"
- Michael Andrews – additional vocals on "Raise Vibration"
- Michael Bellanger – additional vocals on "Raise Vibration"
- Sam Lopez – additional vocals on "Raise Vibration"
- Carmer Carter, Fred White, Jason Morales, John Fluker, Kennya Ramsey, Makeda Francisco, Nikko Lowe, Nikisha Grier-Daniel, Tiffany Smith, Tim Kepler, Valerie Pinkston, Will Wheaton – background vocals on "Here to Love"
- Alix Jones Bragg, Deanna Levitt, Ella Davis Bragg, Katelyn Cambridge, Kyra Courtemanche, Nicole Gamma, Petagay Hollinsed-Hartman – chorus vocals on "5 More Days 'Til Summer"
- Lenny Castro – cuica, congas
- Lisa Wong – looping
- Harold Todd – saxophone
- Michael Sherman – saxophone
- Ludovic Louis – trumpet
- David Baron – Mellotoron, Moog, piano, strings, synthesizer
- George Laks – keyboards
- Miguel – hand claps on "Gold Dust"
- David Baron – orchestration

=== Technical ===
- Lenny Kravitz – production, mixing
- Craig Ross – engineering, mixing
- Gavin Paddock – assistant engineering
- Jennifer Gros – assistant engineering
- Jeremy Nichols – assistant engineering
- Matthieu Lefevre – assistant engineering
- Bernie Grundman – mastering

=== Artwork ===
- Mathieu Bitton – art direction, design, photography

== Charts ==
=== Weekly charts ===
Weekly chart performance for Raise Vibration
Chart (2018)	Peak position
Australian Digital Albums (ARIA)	40
Austrian Albums (Ö3 Austria)	4
Belgian Albums (Ultratop Flanders)	4
Belgian Albums (Ultratop Wallonia)	4
Czech Albums (ČNS IFPI)	4
French Albums (SNEP)	3
Dutch Albums (Album Top 100)	8
German Albums (Offizielle Top 100)	3
Hungarian Albums (MAHASZ)	19
Italian Albums (FIMI)	2
Japan Hot Albums (Billboard Japan)	50
Japanese Albums (Oricon)	38
Polish Albums (ZPAV)	11
Scottish Albums (Official Charts)	13
Spanish Albums (Promusicae)	5
Swiss Albums (Schweizer Hitparade)	3
UK Albums (Official Charts)	19
US Billboard 200	43

=== Year-end charts ===
Year-end chart performance for Raise Vibration
Chart (2018)	Position
Belgian Albums (Ultratop Flanders)	169
Belgian Albums (Ultratop Wallonia)	55
French Albums (SNEP)	99
Swiss Albums (Schweizer Hitparade)	47

== Certifications ==
Certifications for Raise Vibration
Region	Certification	Certified units/sales
France (SNEP)	Gold	50,000^{‡}
^{‡} Sales+streaming figures based on certification alone.
