= Blue Electric Light =

Studio album by Lenny Kravitz
- Released: May 24, 2024
- Studio: Gregory Town Studio
- Genres: R&B; pop; rock
- Length: 55:24
- Labels: Roxie; BMG
- Producer: Lenny Kravitz

Lenny Kravitz chronology
Raise Vibration (2018)	Blue Electric Light (2024)

Singles from Blue Electric Light
- 1. "TK421" Released: October 13, 2023; 2. "Human" Released: March 22, 2024; 3. "Paralyzed" Released: May 20, 2024; 4. "Honey" Released: October 25, 2024; 5. "Let It Ride" Released: April 4, 2025

Blue Electric Light is the twelfth studio album by American rock musician Lenny Kravitz. It was released on May 24, 2024, by Roxie Records with distribution handled by BMG Rights Management. The album was preceded by the release of the lead single "TK421" on October 13, 2023.

== Background ==
Blue Electric Light is Kravitz' first album since Raise Vibration (2018). Kravitz recorded the album in his studio in the Bahamas and played most of the instruments himself with frequent collaborator Craig Ross contributing.

The album was originally scheduled to be released on March 15, 2024. However, Kravitz moved the release date to May 24, 2024, due to his commitments to honoring the legacy of Bayard Rustin.

== Singles ==
The album's lead single, "TK421", was released simultaneously with the album announcement alongside its music video.

"Human" was released on March 22, 2024. It premiered on The Tonight Show.

The songs "Paralyzed", "Honey" and "Let It Ride" were also released as singles, to keep promoting the album during the first legs of the accompanying tour.

== Critical reception ==
Professional ratings
Aggregate scores
Source	Rating
Metacritic	74/100
Review scores
Source	Rating
AllMusic	4/5 stars
American Songwriter	3.5/5 stars
Classic Rock	4/5 stars
i	3/5 stars
The Independent	2/5 stars
Mojo	4/5 stars
musicOMH	3.5/5 stars
Record Collector	4/5 stars
The Times	3/5 stars
WYSO	B

Paul Moody of Louder Sound called the album "A typically diverse collection pulsating with positive energy". Stephen Thomas Erlewine of AllMusic mentioned "Stylistically, Kravitz may not be trying anything new, but his decision to prioritize good vibes above all else generates an unusually satisfying record from the rocker." Greg Simms Jr. of WYSO commented, "It's the funkiest album I've ever heard from him. While Kravitz doesn't go full D'Angelo, he does give us a collection of songs that lean more towards modern pop and R&B than his usual fare. This LP is also a dedication to Prince (the two men were close friends). You can hear Kravitz's nods to His Royal Badness in several cuts on the album, like the ballad "Stuck in the Middle"." Nina Athanasopoulos of The Daily Illini wrote, "Overall, Kravitz's latest album is a generally predictable, yet fun project. While the album is lacking self and social awareness, Kravitz continues to strut his leather pants and open shirts, and one can't help but love him for his consistency."

== Track listing ==
All lyrics are written by Lenny Kravitz, except "Bundle of Joy" and "Heaven", also written by Tony LeMans; all music is composed by Kravitz, except "It's Just Another Fine Day (In This Universe of Love)" and "Paralyzed", also composed by Craig Ross.

Blue Electric Light track listing
No.	Title	Length
1.	"It's Just Another Fine Day (In This Universe of Love)"	6:19
2.	"TK421"	5:27
3.	"Honey"	3:50
4.	"Paralyzed"	4:28
5.	"Human"	4:27
6.	"Let It Ride"	3:35
7.	"Stuck in the Middle"	5:10
8.	"Bundle of Joy"	5:06
9.	"Love Is My Religion"	3:47
10.	"Heaven"	4:49
11.	"Spirit in My Heart"	4:33
12.	"Blue Electric Light"	3:53
Total length:		55:24

== Personnel ==
Musicians

- Lenny Kravitz – lead vocals, backing vocals (all tracks); bass (tracks 1–5, 7–10), synth strings (1–3), Moog (1, 2, 5, 6, 8, 10–12), 11), timpani (1), drums (2–4, 8, 9), rhythm guitar (2, 3, 7–11), claps (2, 9, 10), electric guitar (3–5, 12); electric piano, Mellotron (3); bongo drums, maracas (4); synthesizer (5, 6, 8–12), drum machine (5, 7, 10–12), cowbell (5, 8); chimes, Fender Rhodes piano (5); drum programming (6), piano (7, 9); Hammond B3 organ, sitar (7); solo guitar (9), lead guitar (10); castanets, claves (11); programming (12)
- Craig Ross – rhythm guitar (tracks 1, 2, 10), electric guitar (1, 4), lead guitar (1, 8, 10), programming (1, 11), drum machine (1), solo guitar (5, 9), drums (6); 12-string guitar, acoustic guitar, tambura (11)
- Alex Alvarez – programming (tracks 1, 3–11), synthesizer (2)
- Harold Todd – saxophone (tracks 2, 3)
- Michael Sherman – saxophone (track 3)
- Trombone Shorty – trombone, trumpet (track 10)

Technical

- Lenny Kravitz – production, engineering
- Craig Ross – engineering
- Alex Alvarez – engineering
- Adam Grover – mastering
- Bernie Grundman – mastering

== Charts ==
=== Weekly charts ===
Weekly chart performance for Blue Electric Light
Chart (2024)	Peak position
Australian Albums (ARIA)	84
Austrian Albums (Ö3 Austria)	4
Belgian Albums (Ultratop Flanders)	17
Belgian Albums (Ultratop Wallonia)	4
Croatian International Albums (HDU)	19
Dutch Albums (Album Top 100)	17
French Albums (SNEP)	7
German Albums (Offizielle Top 100)	5
Hungarian Albums (MAHASZ)	40
Italian Albums (FIMI)	13
Japanese Digital Albums (Oricon)	19
Japanese Hot Albums (Billboard Japan)	62
Polish Albums (ZPAV)	8
Portuguese Albums (AFP)	57
Scottish Albums (Official Charts)	10
Spanish Albums (Promusicae)	16
Swedish Physical Albums (Sverigetopplistan)	4
Swiss Albums (Schweizer Hitparade)	2
Swiss Albums (Romandy)	1
UK Albums (Official Charts)	73
UK Independent Albums (Official Charts)	3
US Top Album Sales (Billboard)	11
US Independent Albums (Billboard)	47

=== Year-end charts ===
Year-end chart performance for Blue Electric Light
Chart (2024)	Position
Swiss Albums (Schweizer Hitparade)	99

== Release history ==
Release dates and formats for Blue Electric Light
Region	Date	Format(s)	Label	Ref.
Various	May 24, 2024	CD; digital download; streaming; vinyl LP	Roxie; BMG Rights Management	
