= Fred Macdonald =

American-Swiss filmmaker (born 1965)

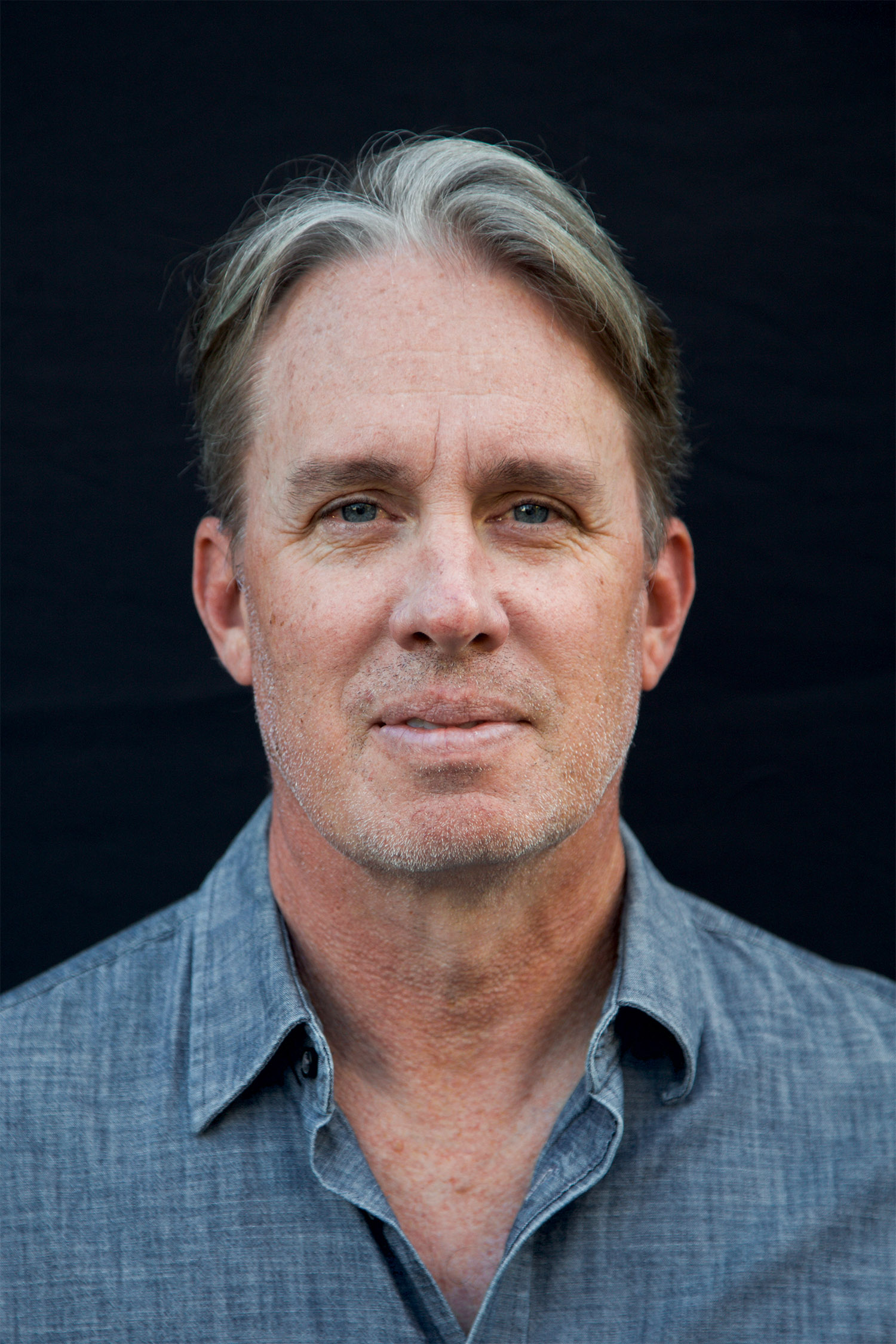
- Born: March 27, 1965 (age 61); Boston, Massachusetts
- Occupations: film producer, screenwriter, director
- Years active: 1987–present

Fred Macdonald (born March 27, 1965) is an American media executive, creative director, and film producer. He is best known for his leadership roles at Olive Jar Studios in the 1990s and for co-writing and producing the critically acclaimed feature film Sew Torn (2024), directed by his son Freddy Macdonald.

== Life and career ==
=== Olive Jar Studios ===
In 1989, Fred Macdonald joined Olive Jar Studios - founded in 1984 by Bill Jarcho and Mark D’Oliveira in Boston - and rose to become its CEO, creative director, and a director on numerous projects.

Under his leadership, the company expanded into television and opened a Los Angeles studio, while retaining its eclectic signature animation style. During the 1990s, Olive Jar produced commercials and broadcast projects for clients including Coca-Cola, Levi Strauss & Co., Cartoon Network, Universal Studios, Disney, Samsung, NBC, and collaborated with creatives such as Spike Jonze and George Meyer.

In September 2000, Olive Jar Studios was acquired by San Francisco-based Red Sky Interactive. Macdonald remained in his executive position following the acquisition. The transaction was reported in The New York Times, which noted the opportunity for Red Sky to expand into design-driven media and creative content.

=== Independent work ===
Following his tenure at Olive Jar, Macdonald transitioned to independent film production. He co-wrote and produced a series of short films with his son Freddy, including Sew Torn (2021), I’m Good (2019), The Coachmen (2018), The Father of Art (2017) and Gifted: Thanksgiving Post Mortem (2016). Between 2018 and 2020, he produced multiple music videos for Grammy-winning musician Fantastic Negrito, including the titles The Duffler, The Suit That Won't Come Off, A Boy Named Andrew and Chocolate Samurai.

In 2024, Macdonald co-wrote and produced Sew Torn, an expansion of the original short, directed and edited by Freddy Macdonald. The film follows seamstress Barbara Duggen, who discovers a botched drug deal. It explores themes of fate, guilt, and resilience through three alternate narratives, each featuring Rube Goldberg–style survival mechanisms built with sewing thread.

Starring Eve Connolly, Calum Worthy, John Lynch, Ron Cook, K. Callan, Thomas Douglas and Caroline Goodall, among others, Sew Torn premiered at South by Southwest Film Festival (SXSW) in March 2024, headlined Locarno Film Festival on the Piazza Grande, and was featured at Sitges, Camerimage and Newport Beach.

It was theatrically released on May 9, 2025, and received widespread acclaim, earning a 95% Certified Fresh rating on Rotten Tomatoes as of July 2025. Reviews appeared in Deadline, Variety, The Hollywood Reporter, Mashable, and Collider. It became available to stream on Netflix on December 1, 2025.

== Filmography ==
Year	Title	Writer	Producer
2000	Harvey Birdman, Attorney At Law (television series)	No	Yes
2016	Gifted: Thanksgiving Post Mortem (short film)	Yes	Yes
2017	The Father of Art (short film)	Yes	Yes
2018	The Coachmen (short film)	Yes	Yes
2019	I'm Good (short film)	Yes	Yes
2019	Sew Torn (short film)	Yes	Yes
2024	Sew Torn (feature film)	Yes	Yes
