= Sew Torn =

2024 film

- Theatrical release poster
- Directed by: Freddy Macdonald
- Written by: Freddy Macdonald; Fred Macdonald
- Produced by: Fred Macdonald; Barry Navidi; Sebastian Klinger; Diamantis Zavitsanos; Socratis Zavitsanos; Timothy Ross; Alexander Stratigenas
- Starring: Eve Connolly; Calum Worthy; John Lynch; K Callan; Ron Cook; Thomas Douglas; Caroline Goodall; Werner Biermeier; Veronika Herren-Wenger; Petra Wright
- Cinematography: Sebastian Klinger
- Edited by: Freddy Macdonald
- Music by: Jacob Tardien
- Production companies: Sew Torn, LLC; ORISONO; Barry Navidi Productions
- Distributed by: Sunrise Films
- Release dates: March 11, 2024 (SXSW); May 9, 2025 (United States)
- Running time: 95 minutes
- Countries: United States; Switzerland
- Language: English

Sew Torn is a 2024 crime thriller film written, directed and edited by Freddy Macdonald. In the US-Swiss co-production, which is based on a short film of the same name, Eve Connolly plays a seamstress on the verge of bankruptcy. The film tells the story of how she comes upon a drug deal gone bad and how her choices at the scene of the crime lead to drastically different outcomes along the way. Sew Torn premiered at the South by Southwest Film Festival and was shown at the Locarno Film Festival on the Piazza Grande in 2024.

== Plot ==
Barbara Duggen (Eve Connolly) is a seamstress struggling to keep her fabric shop alive. After a botched sewing appointment sets her on a quest to replace her client's lost button, she unexpectedly stumbles upon a drug deal gone bad. Faced with two downed motorcyclists, guns, and a briefcase, Duggen is completely torn. She is forced to pick between three choices: commit the perfect crime, call the police, or drive away.

The narrative presents the repercussions of all three decisions, and the deadly confrontations that result from each as she gets entangled with the case's owner. Using thread to free herself, Duggen stops at nothing to save her store.

== Cast ==
- Eve Connolly as Barbara
- Calum Worthy as Joshua
- John Lynch as Hudson
- K. Callan as Ms. Engel
- Ron Cook as Oskar
- Thomas Douglas as Beck
- Caroline Goodall as Grace
- Werner Biermeier as Melvin
- Veronika Herren-Wenger as Rosie
- Petra Wright as Mom / Young Barbara

== Production ==
=== Development ===
The film was directed and edited by Freddy Macdonald, who also co-wrote the screenplay with his father Fred Macdonald. Sew Torn is the first full-length feature film by the director and is based on his 2019 six-minute short film of the same name. The film was part of his successful admission to the American Film Institute and made Macdonald the youngest Directing Fellow ever accepted into the Conservatory. With his AFI thesis film, Shedding Angels, Macdonald went on to win a Student Academy Award in the year 2022. The short film was executive produced by Peter Spears, acquired by Searchlight Pictures and qualified for an Academy Award after a nationwide theatrical release in the USA.

The short film was watched by Joel Coen, who met with Macdonald and advised turning the short into an independent feature. Macdonald's father Fred, who produced all of Freddy's short films, then looked into ways to raise the funds independently. Barry Navidi, producer of Al Pacino's Wilde Salomé and Johnny Depp's Modì, Three Days on the Wing of Madness has collaborated with Macdonald on previous projects and came on as producer with his company Barry Navidi Productions. Subsequently, filmmakers Diamantis Zavitsanos and Socratis Zavitsanos helped raise a significant amount of funds as producers. The twin brothers had once competed against Macdonald at Heartland International Film Festival in the year 2017, went on to win the festival with their short film, Two of Five Million, and have since become collaborators.

=== Casting ===
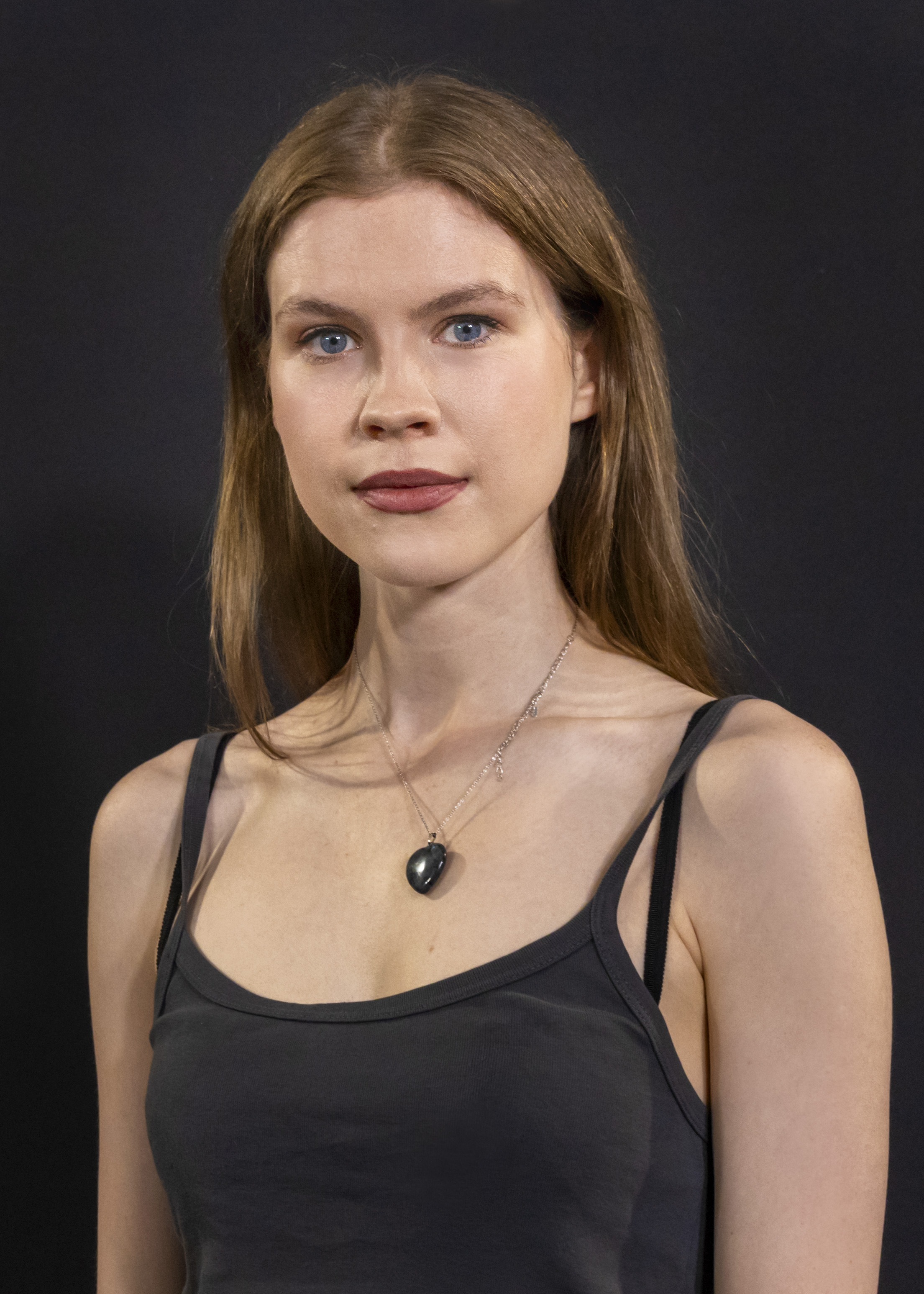
Eve Connolly plays Barbara

Eve Connolly, known from her roles in the film The Other Lamb, and the television series Into the Badlands, plays the leading role of seamstress Barbara Duggen. Sharon Howard-Field and Nathan Wiley were responsible for casting.

=== Filming and post-production ===
Filming took place in the fall of 2022 in the Tamina Valley and Bad Ragaz in the Swiss region of Sarganserland-Werdenberg. The filming for Macdonald's short film also took place there. Swiss cinematographer Sebastian Klinger was already familiar with the region from previous projects. He collaborated with Macdonald on multiple films already and is also one of the film's producers.

The Swiss production company, ORISONO, came onto the project as co-producer, providing local know-how and production services. Having co-produced the Spanish feature Color of Heaven by Joan-Marc Zapata, which premiered at San Sebastián International Film Festival, and having acted as local production partner for Peruvian Netflix series Contigo Capitán, ORISONO was familiar with the circumstances of film production in Switzerland. Also involved in the post-production of Sew Torn, ORISONO's co-founders Alexander Stratigenas and Timothy Ross provided one of the finest Dolby Atmos audio mixing studios of Switzerland for the film along with their business partner Soundville Media Studios.

== Release ==
Sew Torn had its world premiere at the South by Southwest Film Festival (SXSW) on March 11, 2024, in Austin, Texas. It went on to be shown at the Locarno Film Festival on the Piazza Grande, and was an official selection at numerous festivals including Sitges and Camerimage. The feature film was acquired for North American distribution by Vertigo Releasing and Sunrise Films, had a theatrical release in May 2025, and became available to stream on Netflix in December 2025.

== Reception ==
Sew Torn was positively reviewed and featured in Deadline, The Hollywood Reporter, Variety, Mashable, Roger Ebert, and Collider, among others. The Hollywood Reporter described Macdonald as a "wunderkind" and "the filmmaker who dazzled SXSW", Collider called him "one of the most exciting new directors out there", and Variety stated he "may well be the next big thing." As of July 2025, Sew Torn has received positive reviews by 95% of critics recorded by Rotten Tomatoes and has earned Certified Fresh status.

=== Accolades ===
South by Southwest Film Festival 2024

- Nomination for the Kickstarter NextGen Award (Freddy Macdonald)

Locarno Film Festival 2024

- Nomination for the Letterboxd Piazza Grande Award (Freddy Macdonald)

Sitges Film Festival 2024

- Nomination for the New Visions Award (Freddy Macdonald)

Camerimage 2024

- Nomination for Best Cinematography in Contemporary World Cinema (Sebastian Klinger)
