= Johnny Cash (Lenny Kravitz song) =

Single by Lenny Kravitz

from the album Raise Vibration
- Released: March 1, 2019
- Length: 6:18
- Label: Roxie; BMG
- Songwriter: Lenny Kravitz
- Producer: Lenny Kravitz

Lenny Kravitz singles chronology
"5 More Days 'Til Summer" (2018)	"Johnny Cash" (2019)	"Here to Love" (2019)

Audio video
- "Johnny Cash" on YouTube

"Johnny Cash" is a song recorded by American singer and songwriter Lenny Kravitz from his 11th studio album Raise Vibration. It was released as the album's fourth single on March 1, 2019. The music video for the song was directed by Mathieu Bitton.

== Background ==
Kravitz wrote the song as a tribute to Cash as the latter helped him pass through one of the darkest moments of his life. Johnny Cash and his wife, June, were the first persons whom Kravitz saw after learning that his mother, actress Roxie Roker, had died from breast cancer in 1995. In that time, Kravitz lived in Los Angeles at producer Rick Rubin's house. Cash and Carter were there as well. In an interview with the BBC, Kravitz said, "I was a bit fazed and out of it and the two of them just came up to me and surrounded me and held me ... We weren't lifelong friends. I didn't know them that long. We were flatmates," says Kravitz. "They decided at that moment [to] treat me like they would treat someone in their family. It was a beautiful moment of humanity and love."

== Reception ==
Mark Savage of BBC wrote, "the sumptuous, slide guitar-assisted ballad hides a deeply personal story of grief and compassion." Joseph Hudak of Rolling Stone said, "In the slow-burning 'Johnny Cash', Kravitz channels the memory, using it as a modern-day plea for compassion, while a flange guitar effect swirls around him." Madison Desler of Paste wrote, "'Johnny Cash' flips back and forth in the same song—the crazy funky, Parliament-style intro disappointingly dissolving into a lackluster ballad that definitely doesn't need to be six minutes long."
