= TK421 =

Single by Lenny Kravitz

from the album Blue Electric Light
- Released: October 13, 2023
- Length: 3:15
- Label: Roxie; BMG
- Songwriter: Lenny Kravitz
- Producer: Lenny Kravitz

Lenny Kravitz singles chronology
"Raise Vibration" (2021)	"TK421" (2023)	"Road to Freedom" (2023)

Music video
- "TK421" on YouTube

"TK421" is a song by American singer Lenny Kravitz, from his twelfth studio album, Blue Electric Light. The song was released as the album's lead single on October 13, 2023.

== Background ==
Kravitz said in a 2023 interview that the meaning of the song is "positivity, positive energy, positive spirit." The title was inspired by a scene in the film Boogie Nights, in which the character Buck Swope is trying to sell a stereo to a customer and claims that it needs the concocted "TK421 modification" to sound more powerful. Kravitz explained that the TK421 reference in Boogie Nights was an homage by writer/director Paul Thomas Anderson to the science fiction franchise Star Wars, in which TK421 is the identification number of a stormtrooper who received the task of guarding the Millennium Falcon imprisoned in the Death Star.

== Video ==
The song's music video, directed by Tanu Muino, was released together with the single. The video features Kravitz fully nude with his buttocks exposed.

== Reception ==
Mark Seliger of Rolling Stone wrote, "Lenny Kravitz is butt naked and loving life in the music video for his new single... 'TK421' is a Prince-esque blast of uproarious funk rock, with Kravitz pinning his sights on pure uncut ecstasy."

The Lagos Review wrote, "The single 'TK421' is a sonic masterpiece that transcends conventional genre boundaries, seamlessly blending the raw power of hard rock with the infectious beats of electronic pop."

== Charts ==
Chart performance for "TK421"
Chart (2023)	Peak position
Italy (EarOne Airplay)	20
San Marino (SMRRTV Top 50)	18

== Release history ==
List of release dates, showing region, release format, catalog, and label
Region	Date	Format	Label	Ref.
Italy	October 12, 2023	Radio airplay	BMG	
