= John Theodore Cash =

British physician

John Theodore Cash, FRS
- Born: 16 December 1854; Manchester, England
- Died: 30 November 1936 (aged 81); Hereford, England
- Education: University of Edinburgh
- Known for: Regius Professor of Materia Medica and Therapeutics at the University of Aberdeen
- Spouse: Margaret Sophie (daughter of John Bright)
- Children: 4 (2 daughters, 2 sons)
- Awards: Fellow of the Royal Society (elected 1887)
- Scientific career
- Fields: Medicine, Physiology, Materia Medica
- Workplaces: St. Bartholomew's Hospital, London; University of Aberdeen

John Theodore Cash FRS (16 December 1854 – 30 November 1936) was a British physician who was Professor of Materia Medica at the University of Aberdeen for 32 years.

He was born in Manchester, the son of gentleman farmer John Walker Cash, and educated at the Quaker schools at Bootham in York and Kendal. He studied medicine at the University of Edinburgh where he qualified for MB in 1876 and MD in 1879. After a period of post-graduate work in Berlin, Vienna and Paris he returned to Berlin to carry out investigative work at the Physiological Institute on muscle behaviour and in Leipzig on the digestion of fats.

He then returned to London to take up a post at the pharmacological department of St Bartholomew's Hospital and published several papers on physiology. He was elected a Fellow of the Royal Society in 1887.

He was appointed Regius Professor of Materia Medica and Therapeutics at the University of Aberdeen in 1887, becoming Emeritus Professor on his retirement in 1919.

He died aged 82 at his home in Hereford. He had married Margaret Sophie, the daughter of the Rt Hon John Bright, with whom he had 2 daughters and 2 sons.
