= Cash's =

UK woven products company

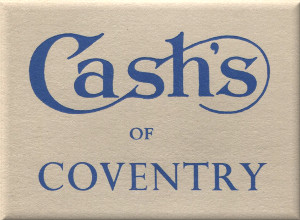
- Founded: 1846
- Founder: John and Joseph Cash
- Headquarters: Seven Stars Industrial Estate, Wheler Road; 52.394747°N 1.483927°W, Coventry, England
- Products: Ribbons, silk pictures, woven name tapes
- Website: jjcash.co.uk

Cash's, or J. & J. Cash Ltd., is a company in Coventry, England, founded in 1846, that manufactures woven name tapes and other woven products and is known for formerly making ribbons.

== Foundation ==
The company was founded by two brothers, John and Joseph Cash, sons of a wealthy stuff (or textile)-merchant, also called Joseph. At the time of the company's founding, the father and sons already had a warehouse and offices in Hertford Street, Coventry. They sold ribbons made for them by outworkers.

In 1846, the two brothers set up a ribbon-making factory with 100 looms, at West Orchard.

== Cash Family ==
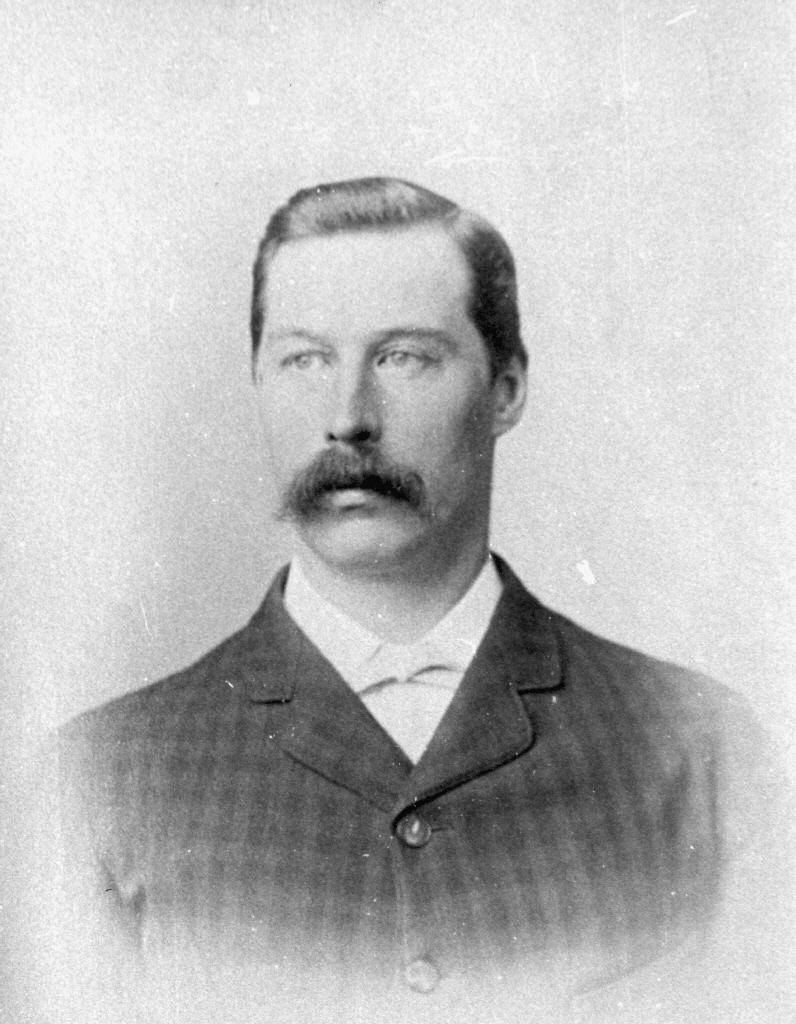
Joseph Cash in 1900

The brothers, who were Quakers, were philanthropists and model employers; Joseph for example founded the Coventry Labourers' and Artisans' Friendly Society, in 1843, along with his friend Charles Bray. This friendly society provided 400 allotments for working people, as well as a store selling groceries.

He built an infants' school in the garden of his home, Sherborne House, in 1853, which he also allowed local Wesleyans to use as a place of worship.

John Cash bought his house, 'Rosehill', from Charles Bray. George Eliot had been staying with the Bray family, and on sale of the property she moved into the smaller Ivy Cottage on the grounds. John's wife was Mary Sibree, to whom Eliot had been tutor of German.

== Cash's Topshops ==
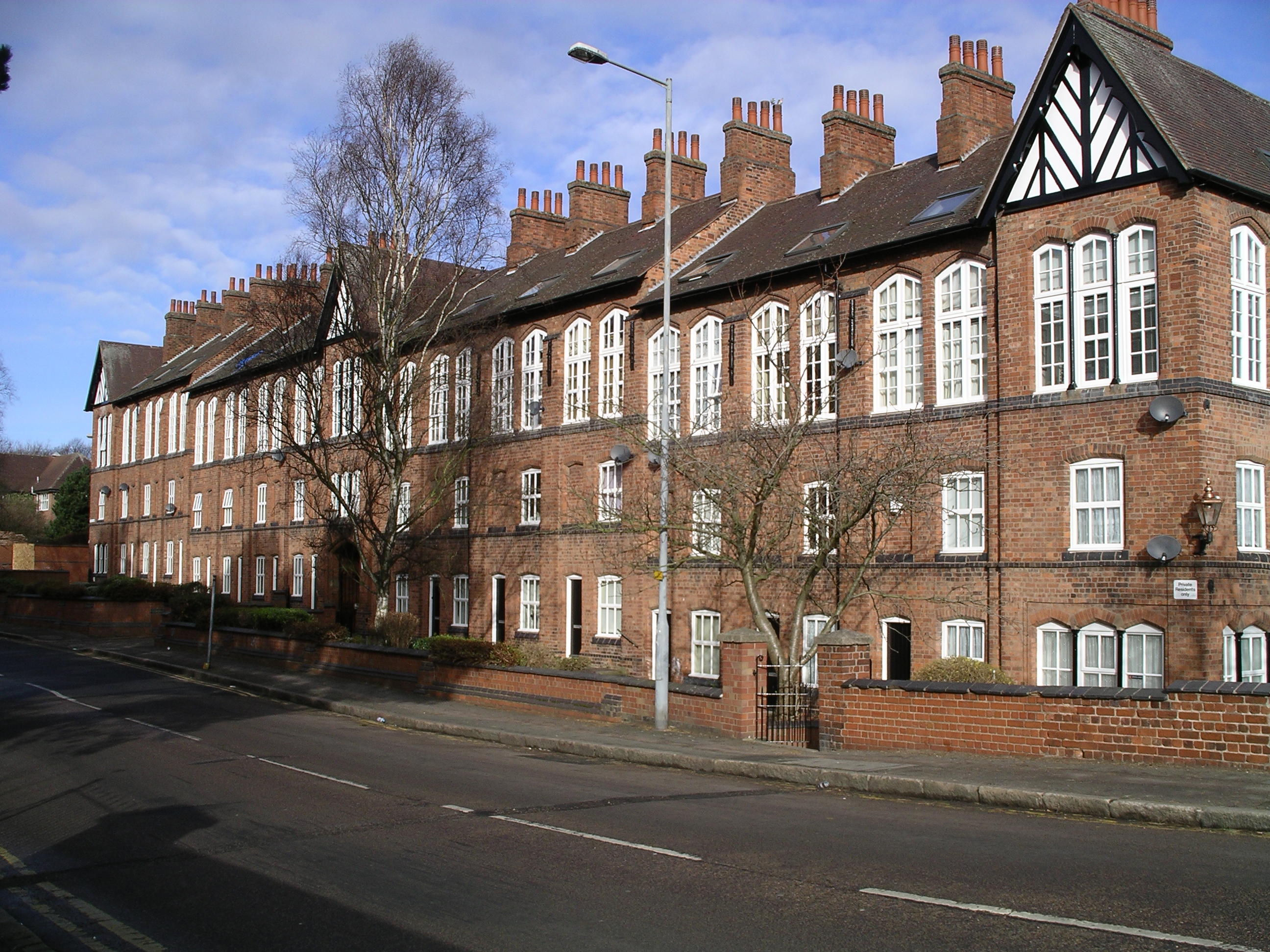
The cottages at Kingfield, on Cash's Lane

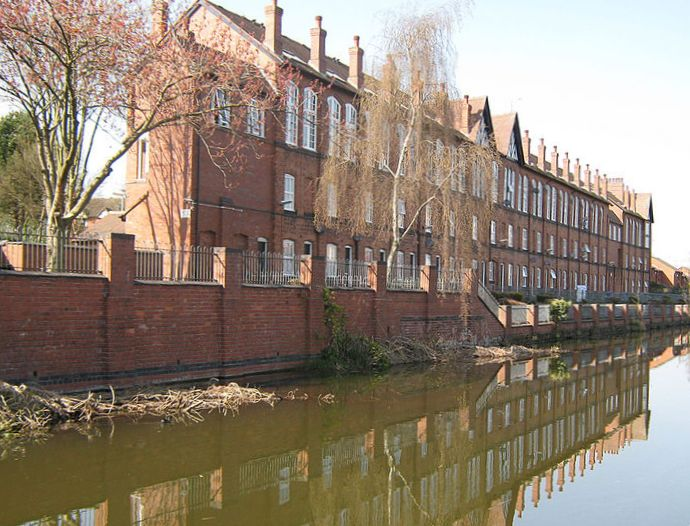
Second block of cottages, facing the Coventry Canal

In 1857, Cash's commissioned a series of three-storey weavers' cottages on a plot of land alongside the Coventry Canal at Kingfield, and on a road now known as Cash's Lane (Note: Cash's Lane: 52.42208°N 1.50796°W), then in countryside, outside the city boundary. Initially 100 such cottages were planned, but eventually only 48 were built, in two blocks. These used bricks, with tiled roofs and mock Tudor barge-boards on the gables. Each had a garden. On the top floor of each cottage was a well-lit work area topshop, known collectively as 'Cash's Topshops', housing a Jacquard loom, powered by a central, steam-powered beam engine. They opened for business on 12 October 1857, and the individual workshops were combined into single, large, workspaces in 1862. The houses still stand, and were Grade II listed on 10 October 1975.

A park called Cash's Park lies nearby, to the west. (Note: Cash's Park: (52.42245°N 1.51057°W)

== William Andrews ==
Cash's first factory manager at Kingfield was William Andrews, his diary has been preserved at Coventry's Herbert Art Gallery and Museum ("The Herbert"). The diary was transcribed by Valerie Chancellor and published as Master and Artisan in Victorian England in 1969.

Andrews (1835-1914) joined the firm in 1855, as a designer, immediately after completing his apprenticeship. The Cash brothers contracted him for three years, at annual salary of £100. In late 1857 he was offered managership of the Kingfield site, and took up residence at 8, Kingfield. He negotiated a salary of £120, with his house, gas and coal provided free. In addition, he was to be paid separately for his design work. However he was not popular with the weavers, and left in June 1858 to manage another part of the business, at Drapers Fields. Andrews had an interest in astronomy and participated in the British Astronomical Association (BAA) expedition to observed the total solar eclipse of 28 May 1900. Andrews subsequently joined the BAA.

== Name Tapes ==
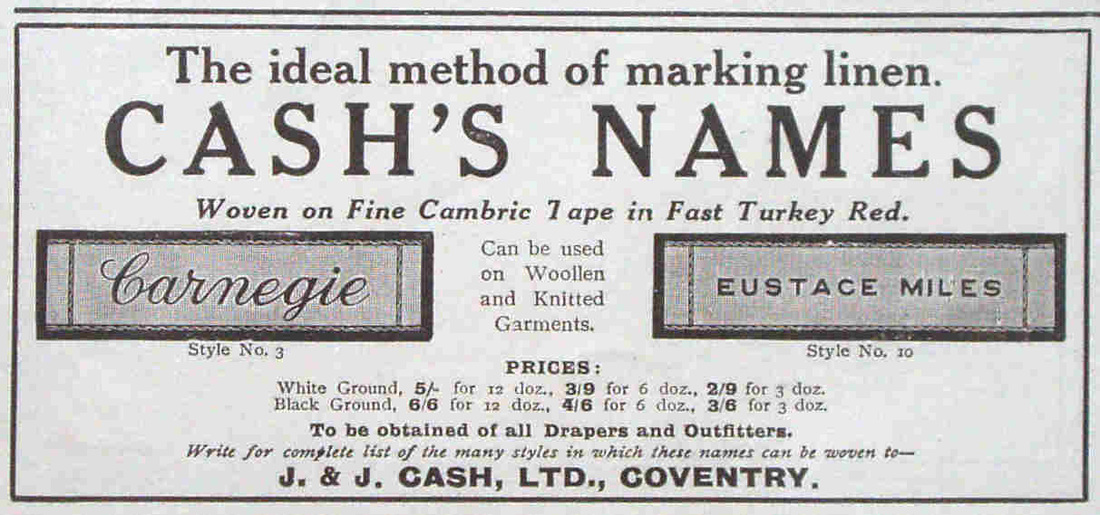
Advert in the Pears' Annual Christmas 1923

The Cash brothers’ willingness to take risks again manifested during the 1870s when the firm began producing coloured embroidery work. This in turn led to the production of embroidered name tapes for clothing, which became the core of the company’s business by the turn of the century. The success of J. & J. Cash, Ltd.’s name tape business soon led to the decision to establish a production facility in the United States.

== J. & J. Cash Ltd. U.S. / Frank Goodchild ==
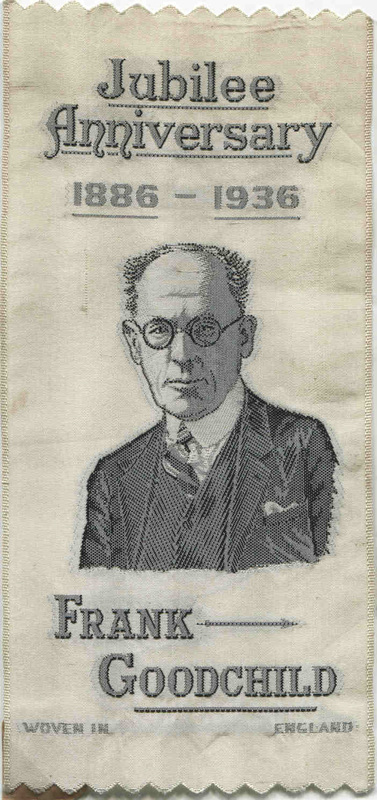
Frank Goodchild commemorative Silk for service to J. & J. Cash Ltd,. UK & the US

A site was secured in South Norwalk, Connecticut, in 1905 and work on the new factory was completed in October 1906. At the time of the building’s completion, executives at J. and J. Cash felt that the size of the new Norwalk plant would suffice for at least 20 years of growth, however, a substantial addition was needed by 1912. It was at this point in time that the manufacture of woven clothing labels was added to the firm’s catalogue, a move that would drive the need for further additions to the factory during the 1920s.

Frank Goodchild served the firm from 1886 to 1946 at Coventry and subsequently in the USA, finally as President of the US Company.

== Post war ==
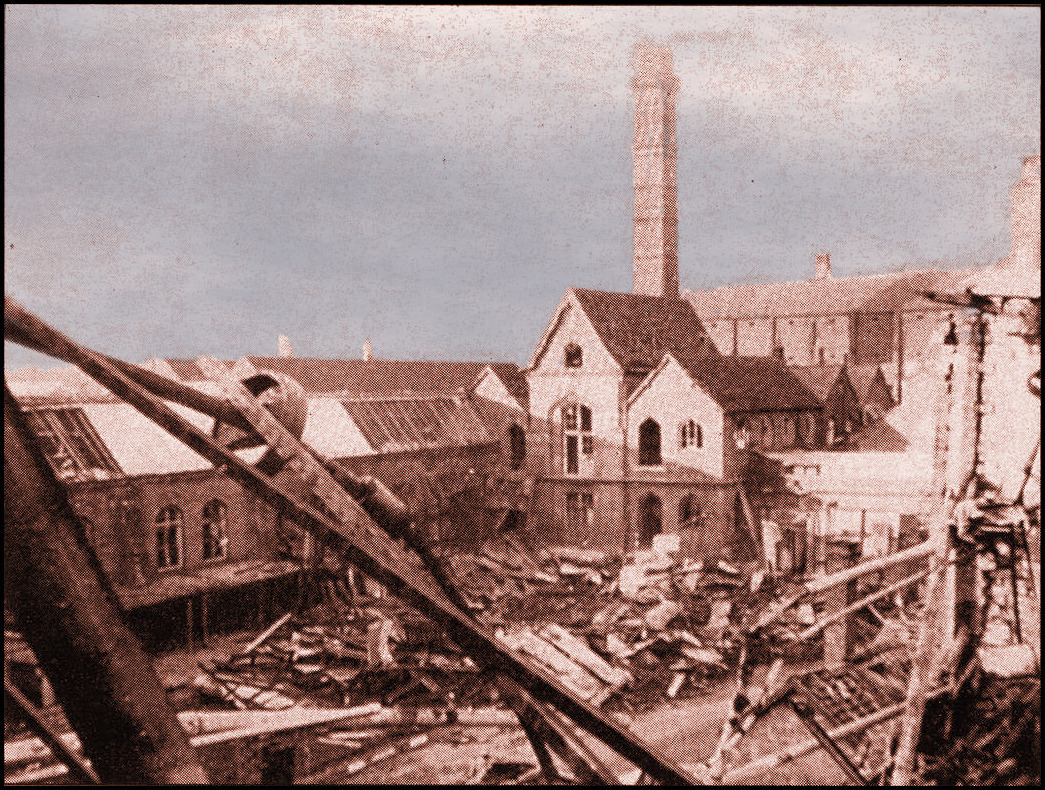
November 1940: factory yard after the raid

The factory was damaged by bombing in the Second World War, and parts subsequently demolished. Cash's had many difficulties rebuilding and trying to get back to pre-war capacity. By 1952 the greater part of the work was done.

Cash's Logo updated circa 1970

During the 1960s, Cash's absorbed other Coventry weaving companies, including B. Laird, Lester Harris and W.H. Grant. Other local competitors failed, leaving Cash's the only survivor of the type in the city. In January 1964, Cash's were appointed 'Manufacturers of Woven Name Tapes to Her Majesty the Queen.'

The company was sold to the Jones Stroud Group in 1976, ending the involvement of the Cash family. In 1984, the Kingfield site was vacated, and the company moved to more modern premises on Torrington Avenue, where it continued to make woven products until January 2014 when the company went into administration. On 13 February 2014 it was announced that Hong Kong based The Jointak Group had invested in the company and that it would reopen under the name "Cash's Apparel Solutions". On 23 December 2014, Cash's moved out of Torrington Avenue to the Seven Stars Industrial Estate at Wheler Road in Coventry. Then moved to unit 13/14 Colliery Lane Exhall Coventry CV7 9NW address registered on 21 December 2019. A final move was made in September 2024 to Saint Mary's road in Leamington Spa.

Cash's no longer make ribbons, although they continue to weave identity nametapes, together with woven pictures, cards and bookmarks. In more recent years the main focus of the business has been a new anti-counterfeit and tamper evident security labelling department for high-end brands, called CertiEye.

== Legacy ==
Many Cash's products are sought after by collectors, and featured in museum collections.

Cash's original records at Kingfield Road were destroyed by a bomb, but many of the company's subsequent archives are in the Coventry local history centre, in The Herbert Art Gallery and Museum. (Note: To access archives go to coventrycollections & search with the name of J and J Cash Ltd. For more information on the Cash's family businesses, pre 1800s to 1960s, search with the name J Cash.)

In 1996, the 150th anniversary of the opening of the company's first factory was celebrated by an exhibition at The Herbert, 'A Woven Image'.

The Primary school: Joseph Cash Primary School is in the Radford area of Coventry.
