= Topshop (workshop) =

Design of building specific to Coventry, Bedworth, and Nuneaton, England

A topshop or top-shop is a design of building specific to Coventry, Bedworth and Nuneaton in the English Midlands, of the 18th and 19th and early 20th centuries. A topshop has three storeys. It is unusual in that the lower two floors are living accommodation, and that the top floor is a workshop containing a weaver's loom. The windows on the top floor are larger than those on the lower two, to let in more light.

The idea of the topshop may have originated locally. Huguenot refugees from France had settled in Coventry and Bedworth. Some were silk weavers. They adopted the Jacquard loom, invented in France in 1804. Coventry and Bedworth became known for their ribbon weavers. That trade required close attention to detail; and therefore, in times before artificial lighting, the best possible use of daylight. The lower floors in a topshop had to be reinforced to support the weight of the loom.

The idea was also taken up by local watchmakers.

The best surviving example of topshops may be at Cash's former factory in Coventry - "Cash's Topshops". At that site, a beam engine supplied power by lineshaft to a community of topshop weavers. Other examples in Coventry may be found on Far Gosford Street.

Some surviving topshops are listed buildings.

== Gallery ==
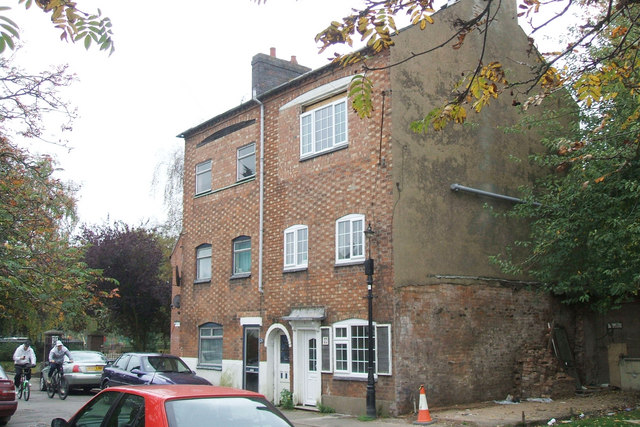
A topshop in Bedworth

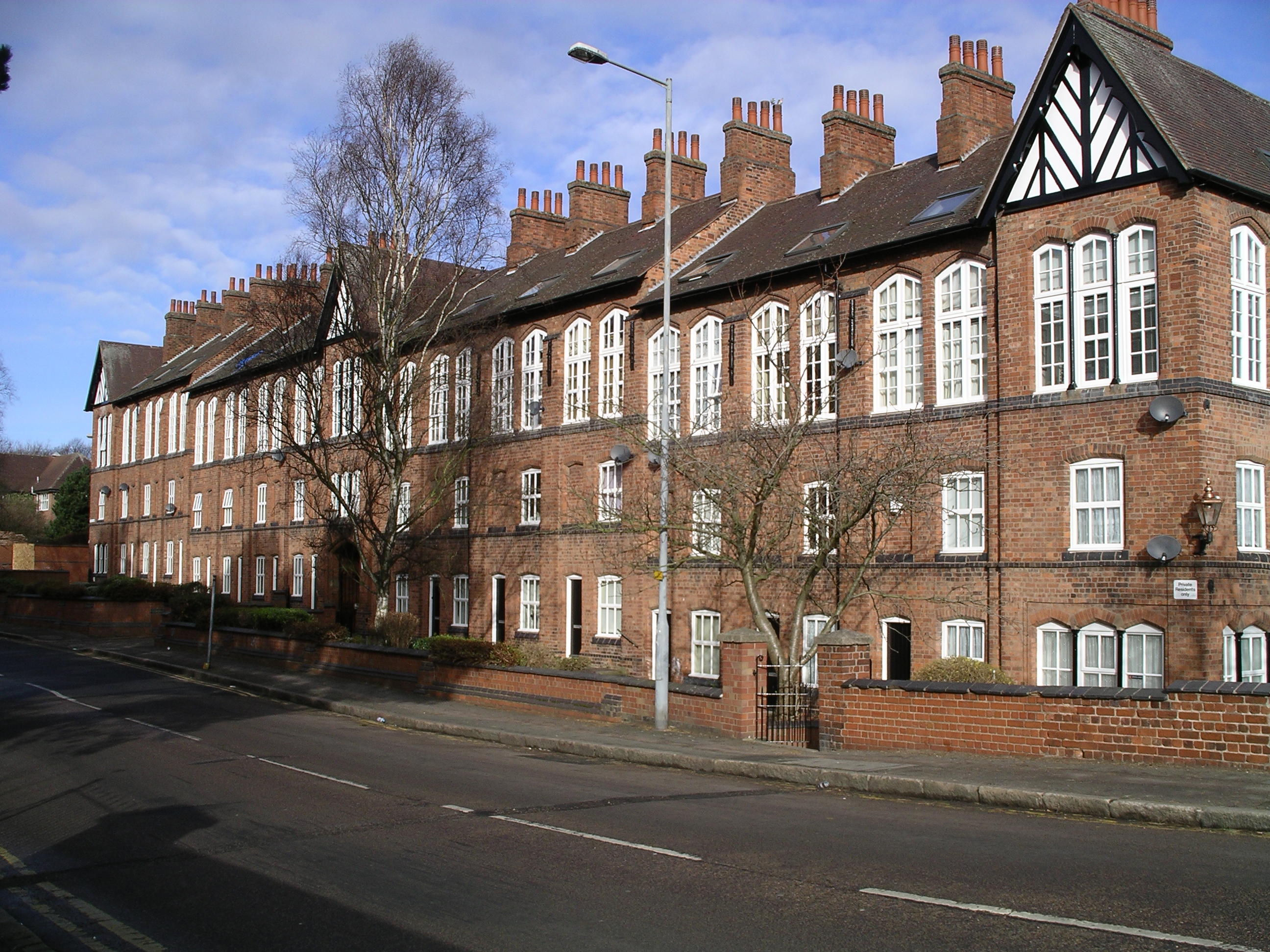
Cash's Topshops, Coventry

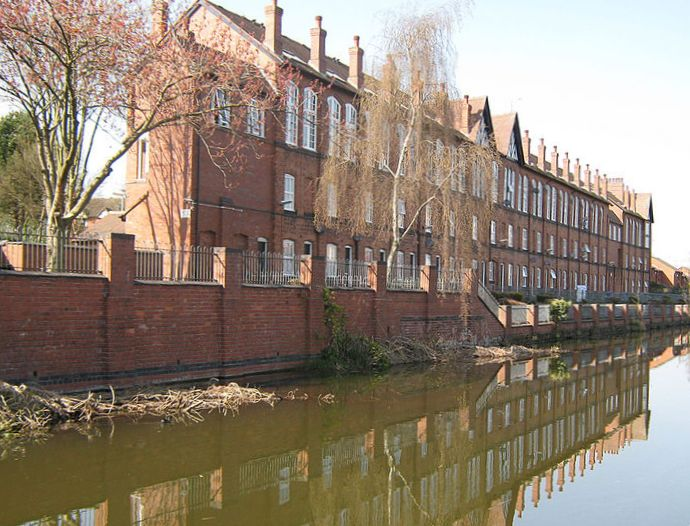
Cash's Topshops, Coventry
