= Freddy Macdonald =

Swiss-American filmmaker (born 2000)

- Born: October 12, 2000 (age 26); Santa Monica, California
- Education: American Film Institute
- Occupations: film director, screenwriter, editor
- Years active: 2016–present

Freddy Macdonald (born October 12, 2000) is a Swiss-American film director, screenwriter, and editor. He is the youngest directing fellow ever accepted to the American Film Institute. His feature film debut Sew Torn premiered at South by Southwest Film Festival and headlined the Locarno Film Festival in 2024.

== Life and career ==
Macdonald was born in Santa Monica, California. His six-minute short film Sew Torn, which he made as part of his application for film school in 2019, was acquired by Searchlight Pictures and qualified for an Academy Award after a theatrical release nationwide alongside Ready or Not. Executive produced by Academy Award winner Peter Spears, it was watched by Joel Coen, who met with Macdonald and advised turning the short into an independent feature. That same year, Macdonald signed with United Talent Agency, and was accepted to the American Film Institute, becoming the youngest directing fellow ever accepted to the Conservatory. His AFI graduating thesis film Shedding Angels won a Student Academy Award and was shortlisted for a student BAFTA.

The world premiere of his first feature-length film Sew Torn, which he also edited and co-wrote with his father Fred Macdonald, took place at South by Southwest Film Festival in March 2024. The feature is an expansion of the short film of the same name, and was directed by Macdonald when he was 21 years old. It went on to headline the Locarno Film Festival on the Piazza Grande, and was an official selection at festivals including Sitges and Camerimage. The film was acquired for North American distribution by Vertigo Releasing and Sunrise Films, had a theatrical release in May 2025, and became available to stream on Netflix in December 2025. It received widespread critical acclaim. The Hollywood Reporter described Macdonald as a "wunderkind" and "the filmmaker who dazzled SXSW", Collider called him "one of the most exciting new directors out there", and Variety stated he "may well be the next big thing." Sew Torn earned 95% positive reviews on Rotten Tomatoes and was awarded Certified Fresh status as of July 2025.

== Filmography ==
Year	Title	Director	Writer	Editor	Notes
2016	Gifted: Thanksgiving Post Mortem	Yes	Yes	Yes	Short film
2017	The Father of Art	Yes	Yes	Yes	Short film
2018	The Coachmen	Yes	Yes	Yes	Short film
2019	I'm Good	Yes	Yes	Yes	Short film
2019	Sew Torn	Yes	Yes	Yes	Short film
2022	Shedding Angels	Yes	Yes	No	Short film
2024	Sew Torn	Yes	Yes	Yes	

== Accolades ==
Year	Award	Category	Title	Result	Ref.
2022	Student Academy Awards	Narrative Short	Shedding Angels	Won	
2024	South By Southwest Film Festival	Visions	Sew Torn	Nominated	
2024	Locarno Film Festival	Piazza Grande	Sew Torn	Nominated	
2024	Sitges Film Festival	Noves Visions	Sew Torn	Nominated	
