= Benecke =

Benecke is a surname. Notable people with the surname include:

- Berthold Benecke (1843–1886), German anatomist and embryologist
- Christina Benecke (born 1974), volleyball player from Germany
- Emil Benecke (1898–1945), German water polo player who competed in the 1928 Summer Olympics and in the 1932 Summer Olympics
- Georg Friedrich Benecke (1762–1844), German philologist
- Joanna Benecke, British-Swedish screenwriter and actress
- Louis Benecke (1843–1919), American businessman, lawyer, and politician
- Lydia Benecke (born 1982), German criminal psychologist and writer of popular science non-fiction
- Mark Benecke (born 1970), German forensic biologist
- Paul Beneke (early 1400s (decade) – c. 1480), German town councillor of Danzig and a privateer
- Robert Benecke (1835–1903), German-born American photographer, operating primarily out of St. Louis
- Wilhelm Christian Benecke von Gröditzberg (1779–1860), German banker, merchant, estate owner and art collector

== See also ==
- Benecke-Kaliko, based in Hanover, developer and manufacturer of surface materials made of plastics
- Beneck
- Beneke
- Behncke
- Brennecke
- Brenneke, company
