= Brennecke =

Brennecke is a German surname. Notable people with the surname include:

- Günther Brennecke (1927–2014), German field hockey player
- Horst Brennecke (born 1939), German field hockey player
- Joachim Brennecke (1919–2011), German actor
- Kurt Brennecke (1891–1982), German Wehrmacht general
- Nena de Brennecke (1883–?), Argentine artist
- Wilhelm Brennecke (1918–1998), German Luftwaffe pilot

== See also ==
- Wilhelm Brenneke (1865–1951) German entrepreneur
- Brenneke
- Benecke
