= Langenhagen =

- Town
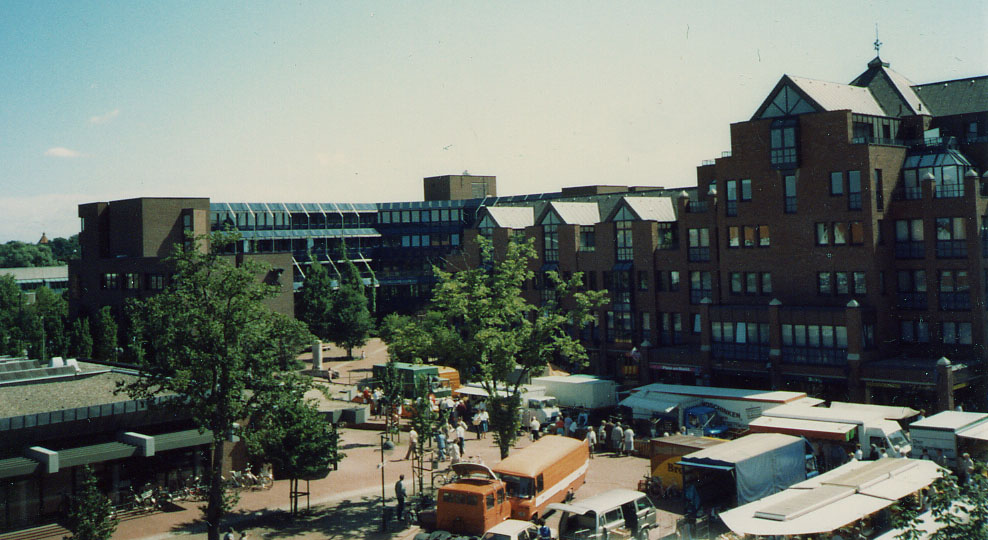
- Town hall in 1989

- Coat of arms

- Location of Langenhagen within Hanover district
- Interactive map of Langenhagen
- Location within Germany Location within Lower Saxony
- Coordinates: 52°26′22″N 9°44′24″E
- Country: Germany
- State: Lower Saxony
- District: Hanover
- Subdivisions: 6 districts

Government
  - Mayor (2021–26): Mirko Heuer (CDU)

Area
  - Total: 71.97 km^{2} (27.79 sq mi)
- Elevation: 51 m (167 ft)

Population (2025-12-31)
  - Total: 54,059
  - Density: 751.1/km^{2} (1,945/sq mi)
- Time zone: UTC+01:00 (CET)
  - Summer (DST): UTC+02:00 (CEST)
- Postal codes: 30851, 30853; 30855, 30839
- Dialling codes: 0511
- Vehicle registration: H
- Website: http://www.langenhagen.de

Langenhagen (German pronunciation: [laŋənˈhaːɡn̩]; Eastphalian: Langenhogen) is a town in the Hanover district of Lower Saxony (Niedersachsen), Germany.

Langenhagen is a small town of about fifty thousand people in Lower Saxony, Germany. The town is about 72 square kilometers and gets an average of 660 mm of rainfall a year. Langenhagen is Located about 8.3 km (5.3 miles) from Hanover and 248 km (154 miles) from Berlin. It is known for its comedy and cabaret scene, plus the Art association of Langenhagen is also notable for protecting modern art and for the sculptures around the city.

== History ==
The first written mention of Langenhagen under its current name originates from 990, and the town is mentioned for the first time in 1312 as Nienhagen. The year 1618 was very important for the development of the town, because Langenhagen received trade privileges. Langenhagen became an important transport hub in the 20th century, mostly due to the construction of the Hannover-Hamburg railroad in 1890, and port on the Mittelland Canal in 1916. By the 1930's the A2 Motorway was built. The Second World War brought enormous destruction and two thirds of Langenhagen were destroyed in bombardments. The period after the war was a period of fast economic and social development, so in 1959, Langenhagen got its city charter, and in 1974, during the administrative reform, the city territory was expanded to its current size.Langenhagen (Germany) :: Град Бијељина :: The Langenhagen standard (German: Langenhagener Norm), declared 1990 and sponsored by Brenneke is an industry standard for the minimal precision of shotguns and combination guns fit for hunting with shotgun slugs.

== Subdivisions ==
Langenhagen consists of Langenhagen proper (including the Old Town, Brink, Langenforth and Wiesenau), Engelbostel (including Kananohe), Godshorn, Kaltenweide (including Altenhorst, Hainhaus, Maspe, Siedlung Twenge, Twenge and Kiebitzkrug), Krähenwinkel, and Schulenburg.

== Economy ==
TUIfly is headquartered at Hanover Airport. Before TUIfly appeared, Hapag-Lloyd Flug (a.k.a. Hapagfly) was headquartered in Langenhagen.

- Bahlsen
- Brenneke
- Hermes, Europe built a new hub in Hanover in 2011, costing around 35 EUR million and 150 new full-time jobs.
- Konica Minolta
- MTU Aero Engines
- Reemtsma
- WAGNER Group GmbH

== Politics ==
In 2001 the town council was elected for five years. The Christian Democrats and the Social Democrats won the election (both parties send 19 councilors to the council). The two "small" parties FDP (Free Democratic Party) and Bündnis 90/Die Grünen (Greens) received two seats each. Dr. Susanne Schott-Lemmer (CDU) is the mayor of Langenhagen. She won against the candidate of the Social Democrats with more than 60 percent.

On 10 September 2006 the town council was elected for five years. The Social Democrats won the election (send 19 councilors to the council). The FDP (Free Democratic Party) got two seats and Bündnis 90/Die Grünen (Greens) received four seats each. The Christian Democrats lost with only 16 seats. Dr. Susanne Schott-Lemmer (CDU) was not elected and is the loser of the elections. Additionally, around 2014 the mayor Langenhagen was Friedhelm Fischer from the Social Democrats with more than 52 percent. The current mayor is Mirko Heuer, elected after winning the election against Fischer with a collective 58.8 percent.

== Twin towns – sister cities ==
Langenhagen is twinned with:

- Southwark, London, United Kingdom
- Novo Mesto, Slovenia
- Głogów, Poland
- Le Trait, France
- Stadl-Paura, Austria
- Bijeljina, Bosnia
- Joinville, Brazil

== Notable people ==
- Augustus Frederick Christopher Kollmann (1756–1829), organist and composer
- Willy Max Rademacher (1897–1971), politician associated with the FDP
- André Breitenreiter (born 1973), footballer

== Gallery ==
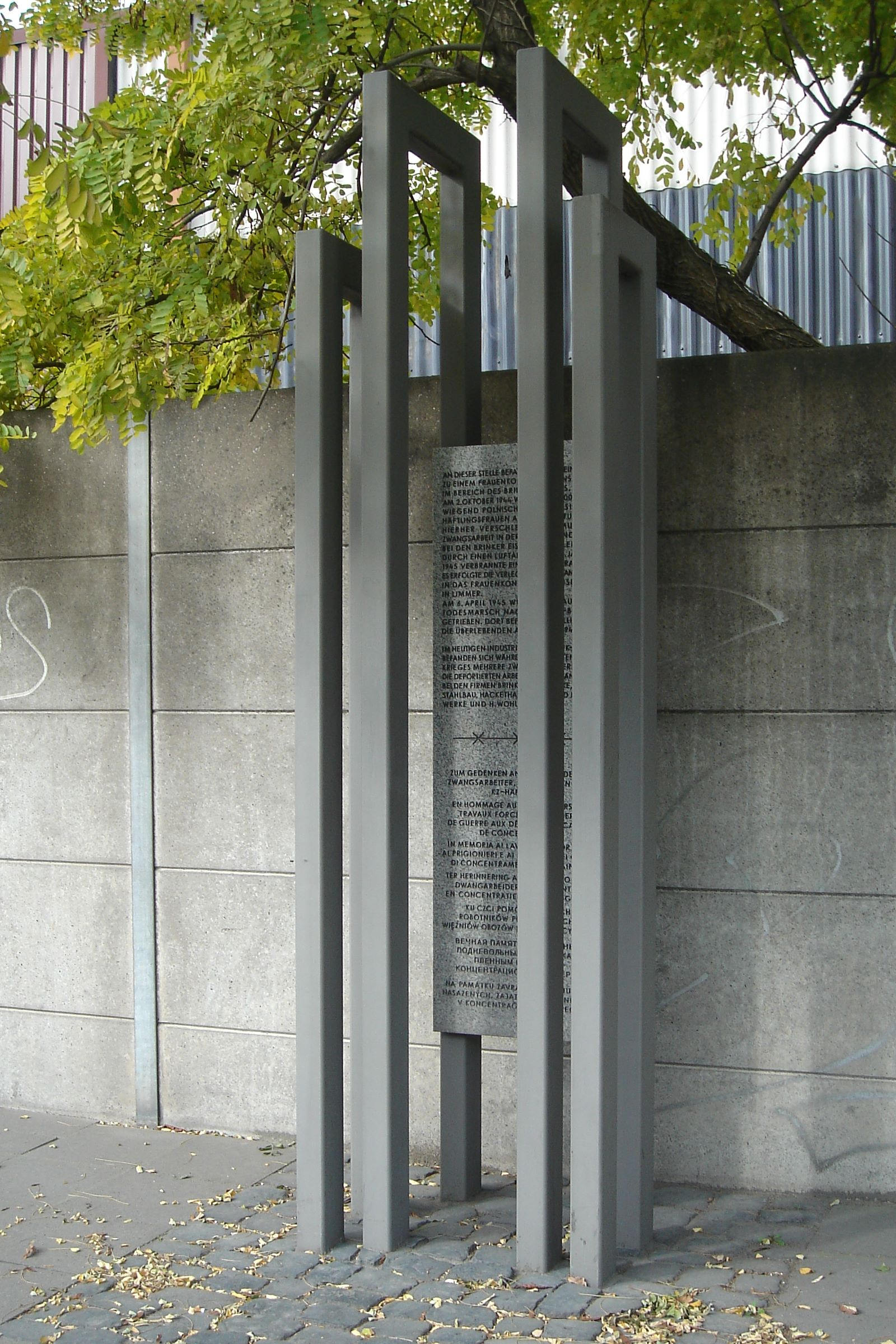
Langenhagen concentration camp memorial

== See also ==
- Metropolitan region Hannover-Braunschweig-Göttingen-Wolfsburg
