= Great South =

Great South may refer to:

- The Great South, a travel memoir by Edward King
- Great South (Italy), a federation of parties of Southern Italy
