= 8×64mm S =

Rifle cartridge

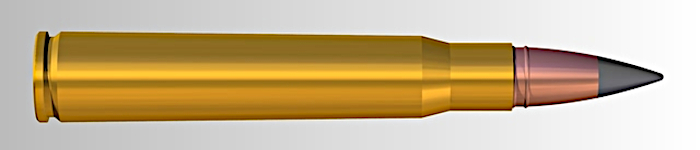
- Type: Rifle
- Place of origin: German Empire

Service history
- In service: Never issued

Production history
- Designer: Wilhelm Brenneke
- Designed: 1912
- Produced: 1912 - present
- Variants: 8×65mmRS (rimmed)

Specifications
- Parent case: none
- Case type: Rimless, bottleneck
- Bullet diameter: 8.22 mm (0.324 in)
- Neck diameter: 8.96 mm (0.353 in)
- Shoulder diameter: 10.85 mm (0.427 in)
- Base diameter: 11.95 mm (0.470 in)
- Rim diameter: 12.00 mm (0.472 in)
- Rim thickness: 1.30 mm (0.051 in)
- Case length: 64.00 mm (2.520 in)
- Overall length: 87.50 mm (3.445 in)
- Case capacity: 4.51 cm^{3} (69.6 gr H_{2}O)
- Rifling twist: 240 mm (1-9.449")
- Primer type: Large rifle
- Maximum pressure (C.I.P.): 405.00 MPa (58,740 psi)

Ballistic performance
Bullet mass/type	Velocity	Energy
12.7 g (196 gr) S&B SPCE	810 m/s (2,700 ft/s)	4,166 J (3,073 ft⋅lbf)
12.7 g (196 gr) S&B HPC	815 m/s (2,670 ft/s)	4,218 J (3,111 ft⋅lbf)
12.8 g (198 gr) Brenneke TIG	848 m/s (2,780 ft/s)	4,600 J (3,400 ft⋅lbf)
14.25 g (220 gr) DWM Starkmantel	800 m/s (2,600 ft/s)	4,562 J (3,365 ft⋅lbf)
- Test barrel length: 600 mm (23.62 in)

The 8×64mm S (also unofficially known as the 8×64mm S Brenneke) (the S means it is intended for 8.2 mm (.323 in) groove diameter bullets) is a rimless bottlenecked centerfire cartridge developed as a military service round for the German Army who never issued it. As is customary in European cartridges the 8 denotes the 8 mm bullet caliber and the 64 denotes the 64 mm (2.52 in) case length.

The 8×64mm is a hunting cartridge in central Europe and can due to its 87.5 mm (3.445 in) maximal overall length fairly easily be chambered in standard sized military Mauser Gewehr 98 bolt-action rifles. In such military M98 bolt actions the magazine boxes, however, have to be adapted by a competent gunsmith to function properly with the 8×64mm S cartridge, since the M98 internal magazine boxes feature an internal magazine length of 84 mm (3.31 in).

== History ==
At the start of the 20th century the famous German gun and ammunition designer Wilhelm Brenneke (1865–1951) was experimenting with the engineering concept of lengthening and other dimensional changes regarding standard cartridge cases like the M/88 cartridge case, then used by the German military in their Mauser 98 rifles, to obtain extra muzzle velocity.

In 1912 Brenneke designed the 8×64mm S cartridge de novo (the 8×64mm S has no other cartridge as parent case). This cartridge is an example of a de novo rifle cartridge (the 8×64mm S and 6.5×64mm have no other cartridge as parent case) intended as a ballistic upgrade option for the Mauser Gewehr 98 rifles that were then standard issue in the German military. The external cartridge case dimensions like overall length and slightly larger case head diameter compared to the German 8×57mm IS military cartridge coupled with a moderate increase in maximum pressure were chosen with easy conversion of Gewehr 98 rifles for the 8×64mm S in mind. Brenneke hoped that he could achieve a major success with this round designed in an age when military doctrine expected rifle shots at ranges up to 800 to 1000 m (875 to 1094 yards). The German military chose however to stick to their 8×57mm IS rifle cartridge avoiding rechambering their service rifles for a larger and heavier cartridge that due to its more favourable case volume to bore area ratio made it ballistically superior to the 8x57mm.

Commercially the 8×64mm S was after an initial success phase in the period between the World Wars rather unsuccessful. Brenneke's engineering concept to lengthen the 57 mm (2.244 in) long M/88 cartridge case to create new for those days very powerful cartridges was essentially sound and he persisted in the development of new cartridges like the commercially successful 7×64mm along this line.

The 8×64mm S offered compared to the 8×57mm IS about 2 to 5% extra muzzle velocity. This results in a flatter trajectory and better performance at longer range.

Beside the 8×64mm S rifle cartridge Brenneke also designed a rimmed version for break action rifles of the cartridge. The rimmed 8×65mmR S variant of the cartridge was also rather commercially unsuccessful.

The gun designer Otakar Galaš originally developed a sniper rifle based on a Mauser M98 action chambered in 8×64mm S around 1950. It was tested under the ZG 47 designation. The rifle was redesigned by Galaš based on a Mosin Nagant action and chambered in 7.62×54mmR. In its final form, Galaš’ rifle was adopted in 1954 by Czechoslovakia, and produced from 1956 until 1958 as the vz.54.

=== 8×64mm ===
This cartridge also exists in an 8×64mm variant (without the S or any other further additions) intended for a different bullet diameter. Rifles chambered for the 8×64mm sport the earlier tighter 8.07 mm (.318 in) I-bore as found in the 8×57mm I.

To avoid potentially serious accidents, it is important to distinguish clearly between cartridges loaded for these two different bullet diameters, and only fire them in appropriately chambered/barrelled rifles.

=== Rimmed variants ===
In 1914 Brenneke introduced rimmed variants for break action rifles of the 8×64mm S and 8×64mm rimless variants. These rimmed variants are known as the 8×65mmRS and 8×65mmR.

== Cartridge dimensions ==
The 8×64mm S has 4.51 ml (69.5 grains) H_{2}O cartridge case capacity. A sign of the era in which the 8×64mm S was developed are the gently sloped shoulders. The exterior shape of the case was designed to promote reliable case feeding and extraction in bolt-action rifles, under extreme conditions.

8×64mm S maximum C.I.P. cartridge dimensions. All sizes in millimeters (mm).

Americans would define the shoulder angle at alpha/2 ≈ 14 degrees. The common rifling twist rate for this cartridge is 240 mm (1 in 9.45 in), 4 grooves, Ø lands = 7.89 mm, Ø grooves = 8.20 mm, land width = 4.40 mm and the primer type is large rifle or large rifle magnum depending on the load.

According to the official C.I.P. (Commission Internationale Permanente pour l'Epreuve des Armes à Feu Portatives) rulings the 8×64mm S can handle up to 405.00 MPa (58,740 psi) P_{max} piezo pressure. In C.I.P. regulated countries every rifle cartridge combo has to be proofed at 125% of this maximum C.I.P. pressure to certify for sale to consumers. This means that 8×64mm S chambered arms in C.I.P. regulated countries are currently (2016) proof tested at 506.00 MPa (73,389 psi) PE piezo pressure.

The American 8mm-06 wildcat cartridge (in European nomenclature the 8mm-06 would be termed as 8×63mm S) is probably the closest ballistic twin of the 8×64mm S. This is a necked up .30-06 Springfield wildcat made to accept 8 mm (.323 in) bullets. This modification was performed to German Mauser 98 rifles in the US to facilitate the use of a commonly available cartridge case in the US, since the German 8×57mm IS cartridge was not readily available in the US when troops brought German Mauser service rifles home as war souvenirs after World War II.

== Contemporary use ==
The 8×64mm S is offered as a chambering option in some European hunting rifle manufacturers' product palettes. The 8×64mm S performance lies between the commercially important 8×57mm IS standard cartridge and the 8×68mm S magnum cartridge making it suitable for hunting all kinds of European game. In the year 2001 the Brenneke Company tried to revive the 8×64mm S cartridge by offering it loaded with 12.8 gram Brenneke Torpedo Ideal Geschoß (TIG) hunting bullets. Sellier & Bellot and Brenneke are currently (2007) the only ammunition manufacturers offering 8×64mm S factory loads. Loaded with short light bullets it can be used on small European game like roe deer and chamois. Loaded with long heavy bullets it can be used on big European game like boar, red deer, moose and brown bear. The 8×64mm S offers very good penetrating ability due to a fast twist rate that enables it to fire long, heavy bullets with a high sectional density. The 8×64mm S can be used in countries which ban civil use of former or current military ammunition. In France, where the possession of rifles in their original military caliber is tightly regulated, cartridges like the 8×64mm S allow French licensed gun owners to possess rifles based on the Mauser Gewehr 98 system under the less constraining "hunting rifle" category. The also rare 8×60mm S cartridge offers a comparable rechambering option for Mauser Gewehr 98 and Karabiner 98k based hunting rifles sporting 8 mm S-bores. Due to its larger case capacity the 8×64mm S chambering offers better ballistic performance than the 8×60mm S. The 8×64mm S rimmed sister cartridge, the 8×65mm RS, is also not popular in central Europe for the same reasons as the 8×64mm S.

== 8 mm cartridges compared ==
Maximum muzzle velocity comparison in % of the probably most proliferated European and American 8 mm rifle cartridges out of 650 mm (25.59 in) long barrels loaded with relatively light to heavy 8 mm bullets to their C.I.P. or SAAMI (Sporting Arms and Ammunition Manufacturers’ Institute) sanctioned maximum pressures.

Bullet weight gram (grain)	8.23 g (127 gr)	9.72 g (150 gr)	11.34 g (175 gr)	12.96 g (200 gr)	14.26 g (220 gr)	Case capacity (%)
8×57mm IS	100.0	100.0	100.0	100.0	100.0	100.0
8×64mm S	102.7	102.7	102.8	102.9	102.9	110.3
.325 WSM	108.7	109.1	109.0	109.3	111.1	131.7
8×68mm S	108.4	108.5	108.7	110.5	112.3	136.5
8 mm Rem. Mag.	111.9	112.3	114.5	115.3	116.0	157.1

This comparison is not totally objective since the 8mm Remington Magnum operates at 460 MPa (66717 psi), the .325 Winchester Short Magnum at 435 MPa (63,091 psi), the 8×68mm S at 440 MPa (63817 psi), the 8×64mm S at 405 MPa (58740 psi) and the 7.92×57mm Mauser at 390 MPa (56564 psi) maximum chamber piezo pressure. Higher chamber pressure results in higher muzzle velocities. The 8mm-06 wildcat cartridge, based on the .30-06, has nearly identical dimensions and case capacity to the 8×64mm and thus offers similar performance.

== See also ==
- List of rifle cartridges
- 8 mm caliber
- Brenneke
- 7×64mm
- 9.3×64mm Brenneke
