= Robert Benecke =

American photographer (1835–1903)

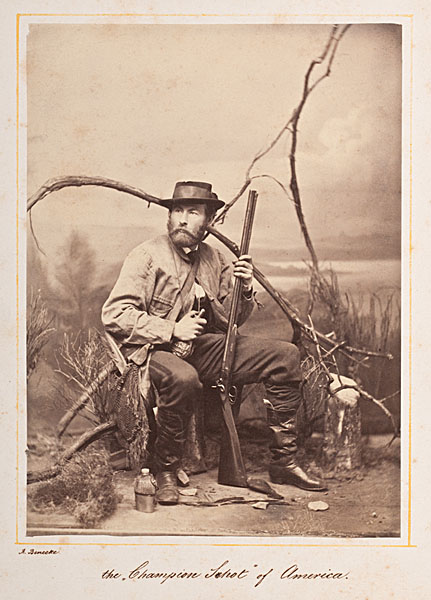
- Self-portrait with hunting rifle
- Born: January 25, 1835; Stiege, Germany
- Died: November 3, 1903 (aged 68); St. Louis, Missouri, United States
- Resting place: Bellefontaine Cemetery; St. Louis, Missouri
- Occupations: Photographer, teacher
- Spouse: Mary Koenig (m. 1865)

Robert Benecke (January 25, 1835 – November 3, 1903) was a German-born American photographer, operating primarily out of St. Louis in the latter half of the 19th century. Along with portraits, his works included photographs of railroads, bridges, buildings, and steamboats. He received considerable acclaim for his exhibit at the 1869 St. Louis Fair, and was among the earliest Americans to experiment with the artotype process in the early 1870s. He later turned to dry plate manufacturing, and worked as an editor for the St. Louis and Canadian Photographer in the 1890s.

== Life ==
Benecke was born in the German town of Stiege, then part of the Duchy of Brunswick, on January 25, 1835. He was the son of Heinrich Ludwig Theodore Benecke, a teacher, and Johanna Auguste Bock. He studied at Blankenburg College, initially in hopes of becoming a civil engineer. After graduating, he enlisted in the Brunswick army in 1854. On a visit to the town of Nordhausen in 1855, he had his picture taken at an ambrotype studio. Impressed, he returned to the studio shortly afterward to work as an assistant and learn the photography trade. His first camera utilized a Lebrun lens and a plate holder he had constructed himself.

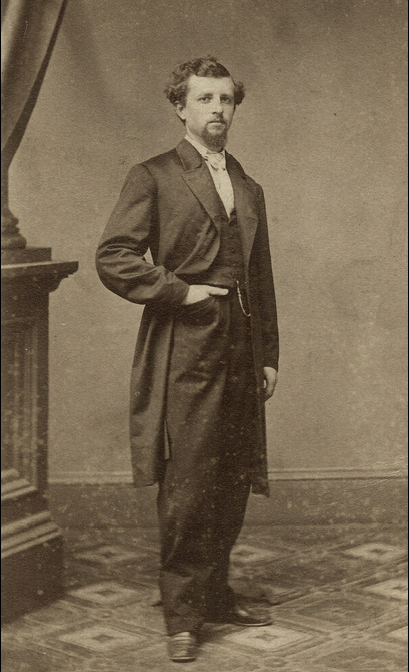
Carte de visite of brewer Adolphus Busch by Hoelke and Benecke

Due to their pro-democracy activities, the Beneckes were forced to flee to the United States, arriving in Brunswick, Missouri, on August 1, 1856. Robert worked variously as a farmer, cooper, and piano tuner, and briefly taught German, French, and Latin at the Brunswick Seminary. Around 1857, he founded a photography studio in partnership with itinerant daguerreotypist E. Meier and painter Joseph Keyte. In December 1858, Benecke announced he had acquired a powerful new camera that could take photographs of any size.

In April 1859, Benecke and his partners announced they were relocating to Pike's Peak Country in Colorado, where gold had recently been discovered, though there is no evidence they ever actually made the move. Later that year, Benecke moved briefly to Knoxville, Tennessee, where with publisher Henry Hunt Snelling's help he had obtained temporary work as a photographer. By mid-1860, he was back in St. Louis, and had returned to Brunswick by November 1860. At the outbreak of the Civil War, he supported the Union, and enlisted in the 18th Missouri Volunteer Infantry. In December 1861, he suffered an eye injury, and was granted a medical discharge.

In early 1862, Benecke purchased a studio on Market Street in St. Louis in partnership with photographer Hermann Hoelke, who had received considerable attention after his photograph of General Sterling Price appeared in Frank Leslie's Illustrated Newspaper in September 1861. By the end of the war, the studio was the most prominent in St. Louis. After the war, the duo captured several prizes at the 1867 and 1868 St. Louis Fairs. Sometime around 1869, Benecke dissolved his partnership with Hoelke, and continued alone.

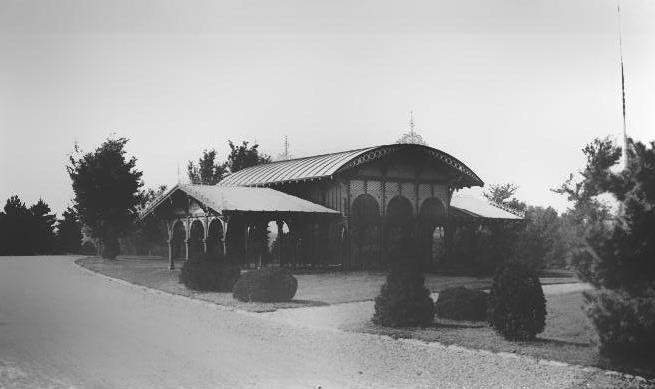
Artotype of a pavilion at Tower Grove Park taken by Benecke in 1883

Benecke nearly swept the photography prizes at the 1869 St. Louis Fair, including first prizes for photographic views, stereographs, and pastel or chalk on photographs. In 1871, he toured the Lower Mississippi River to take photographs for a stereo card collection. In June 1873, he accompanied writer Edward King on a tour of the Indian Territory, and published several photographs of this tour in Scribner's Magazine the following month. In October 1873, Benecke was hired by the Kansas Pacific Railroad to provide nearly 100 promotional shots along its line from Kansas to Denver, which he accomplished using a rail car outfitted with a darkroom. After completing this task, he spent part of November 1873 photographing Denver and the surrounding mountains.

In early 1872, Benecke began working with the artotype process, which involved the application of printer's ink to a photograph to prevent fading. He was one of the first American photographers, and the first west of the Mississippi River, to make extensive use of this process. After a trip to Germany in 1883, Benecke began manufacturing dry plates. In 1886, he was hired by fellow German immigrant Gustav Cramer to supervise the Cramer Dry Plate Works in St. Louis, a position he held for the rest of his life. Beginning in the 1890s, Benecke began working as an editor for the St. Louis and Canadian Photographer, a magazine that had been established by his friend John Fitzgibbon (1817–1882), and published by Fitzgibbon's widow, Maria.

After suffering from a stomach-related illness for several weeks, Benecke died at his home on Armand Avenue in St. Louis on November 3, 1903. He is interred with his family at the Bellefontaine Cemetery in St. Louis.

== Works ==
Early in his career, Benecke was inspired by Charles Waldack's Treatise of Photography on Collodion. Benecke's studio in the late 1850s advertised ambrotypes and daguerreotypes, and offered copying and enlargement services. By late 1860, he was offering melainotypes and photo coloring services (namely coloring photos using water colors or oils). By the early 1880s, he was working almost exclusively with artotypes.

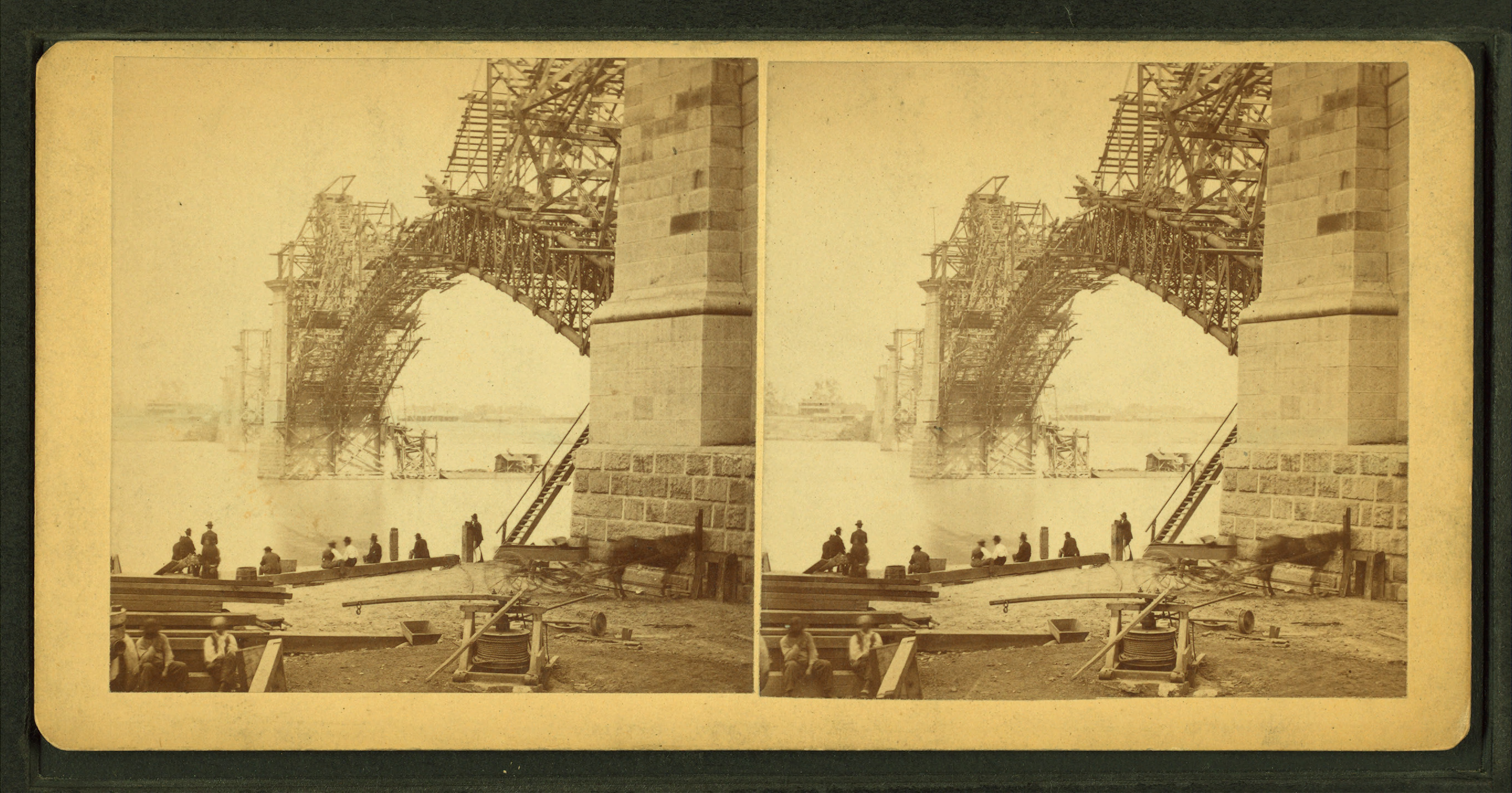
Stereo card by Benecke showing the Eads Bridge under construction

Benecke photographed numerous places in St. Louis and its vicinity throughout his career, including steamboats, bridges, streets, and panoramic views. One of his most popular stereo card collections featured the Eads Bridge in its various phases of construction. A panoramic view of St. Louis exhibited by Benecke at the 1870 St. Louis Fair was widely praised. In 1883, he provided several artotypes for a guide and history of Tower Grove Park.

Benecke was writing articles on photography as early as the late 1850s, when he was submitting articles to Snelling's Photographic and Fine-Art Journal. During the 1870s and 1880s, Benecke wrote articles on topics ranging from improvising with minimal equipment to how to select and care for lenses. As an editor for the St. Louis and Canadian Photographer, Benecke wrote a column, "Echoes from Europe," which provided a summary of articles translated from German and French photography journals.

In an 1888 article, Benecke gave insight into the process he used to create stereo cards. He suggested using two achromatic lenses of "six inches focus" placed 3 inches (76 mm) apart. He noted that careful attention should be paid to trimming and mounting the finished images, arguing that errors during this part of the process were frequently to blame for the double images not matching one another or lining up. He bemoaned the lack of interest in stereo cards among younger photographers.

Benecke's photographs are now part of the collections of the New York Public Library, the J. Paul Getty Museum, and Southern Methodist University.

== Family ==
Benecke married Mary Koenig on November 22, 1865. They had four children: Olga, Anna, Josephine, and Theodore. Benecke's younger brother, Louis Benecke (1843–1919), was a prominent politician, entrepreneur and inventor who served in the Missouri Senate from 1869 to 1875. Louis's son Ruby Benecke (1884–1973) was a prominent attorney and politician who held a string of lower political offices during the mid-20th century.

== Gallery ==
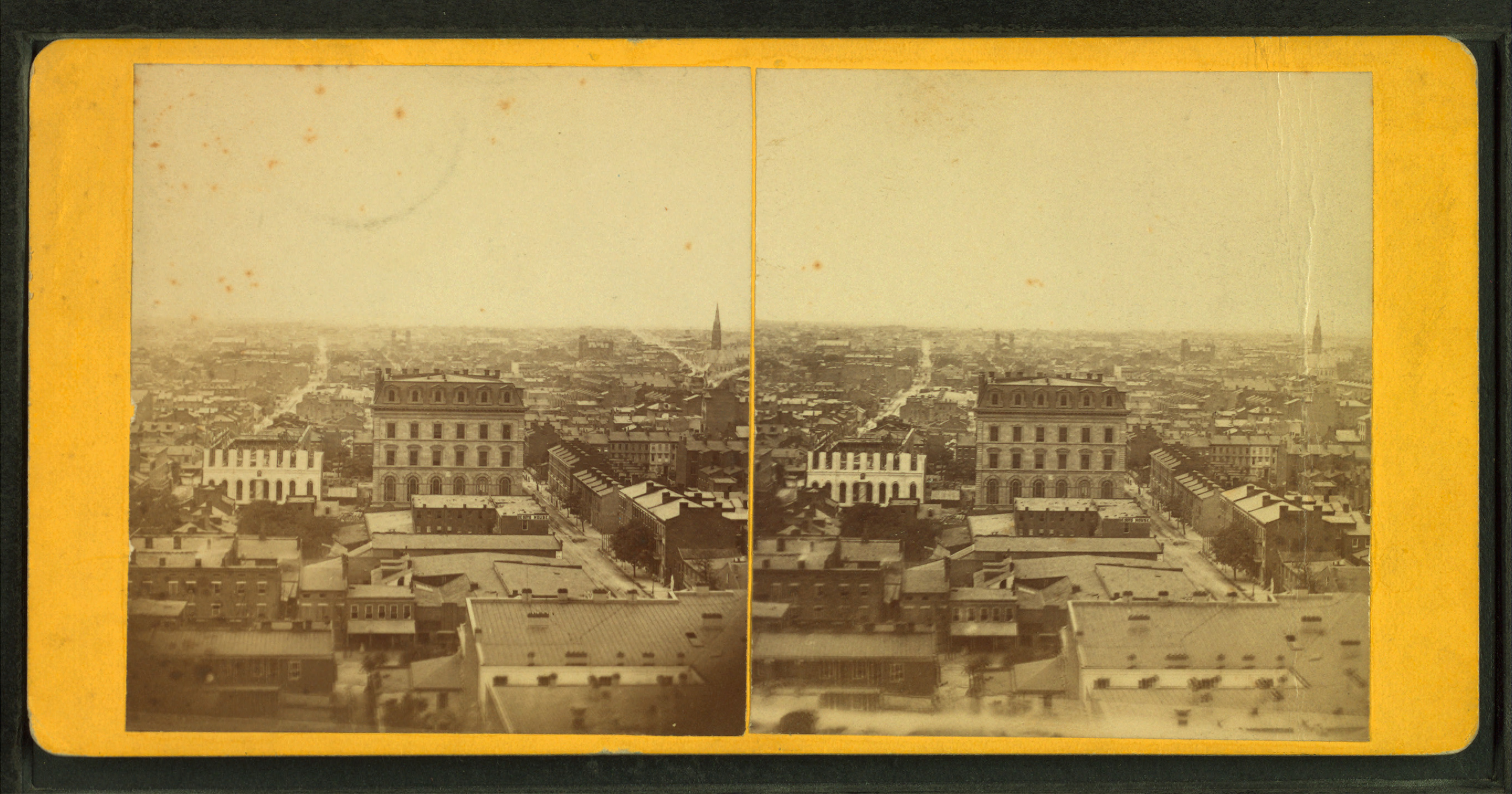
Bird's eye view of St. Louis

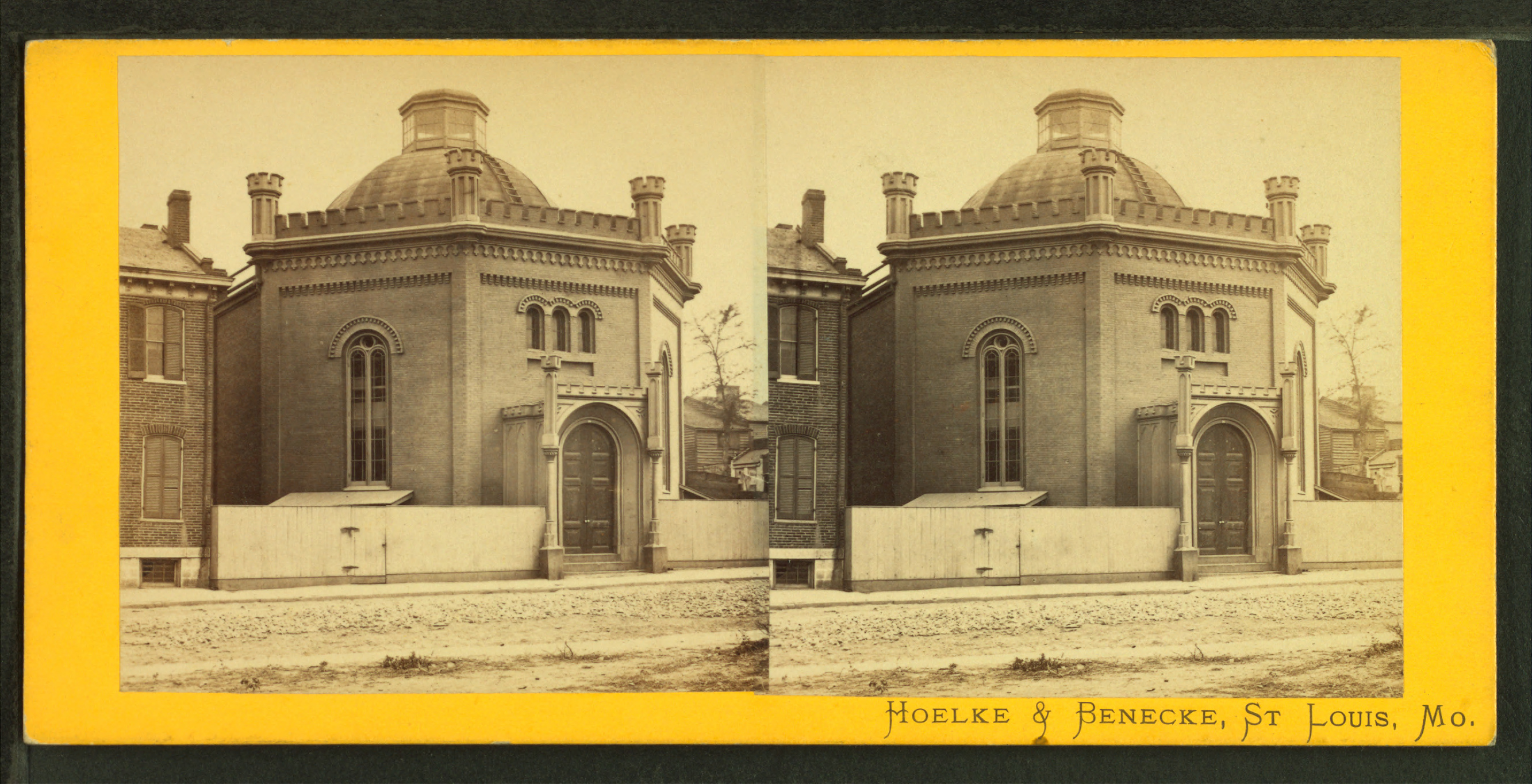
Synagogue

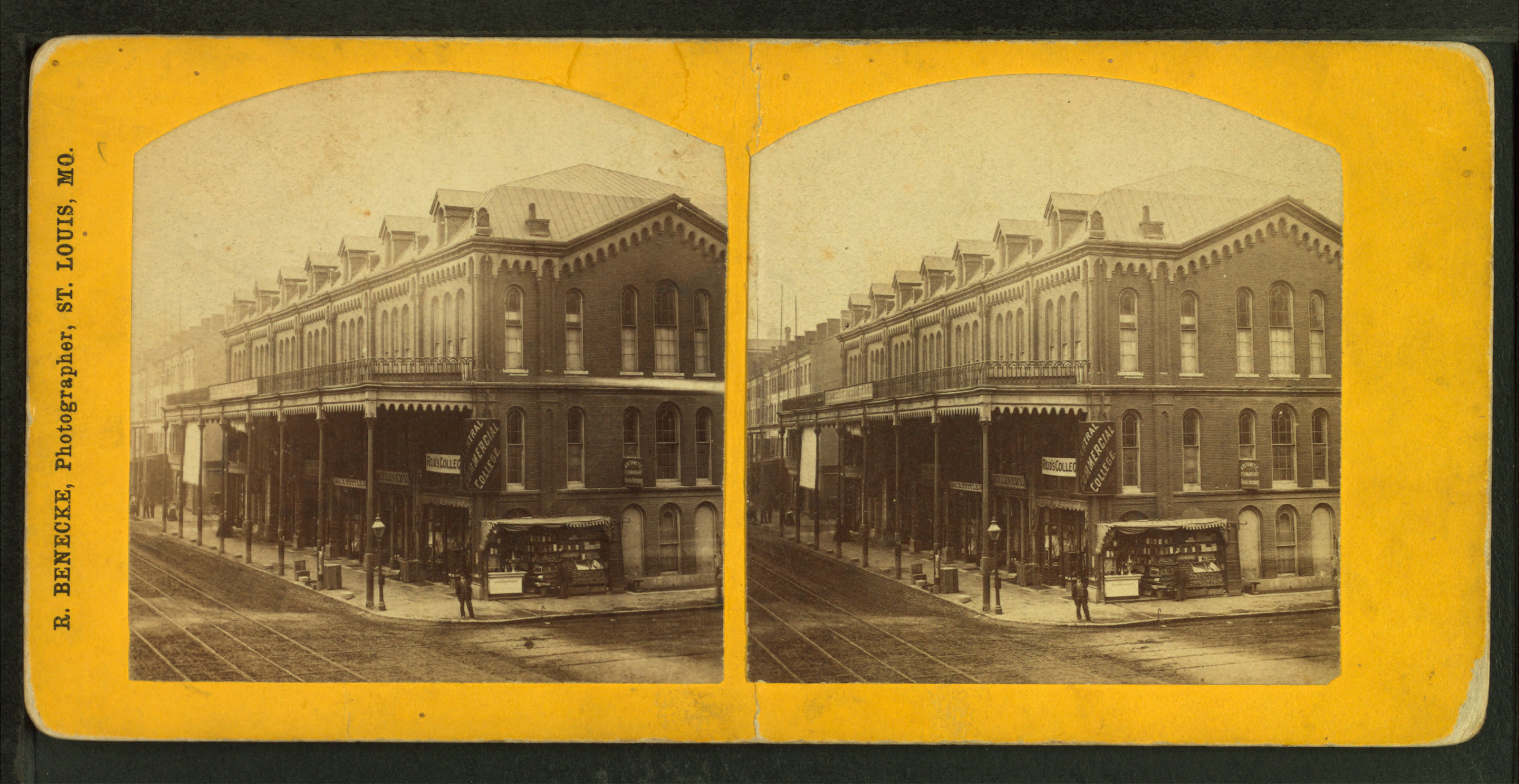
Veranda Row in St. Louis
