= 8×60mm S =

Rifle cartridge

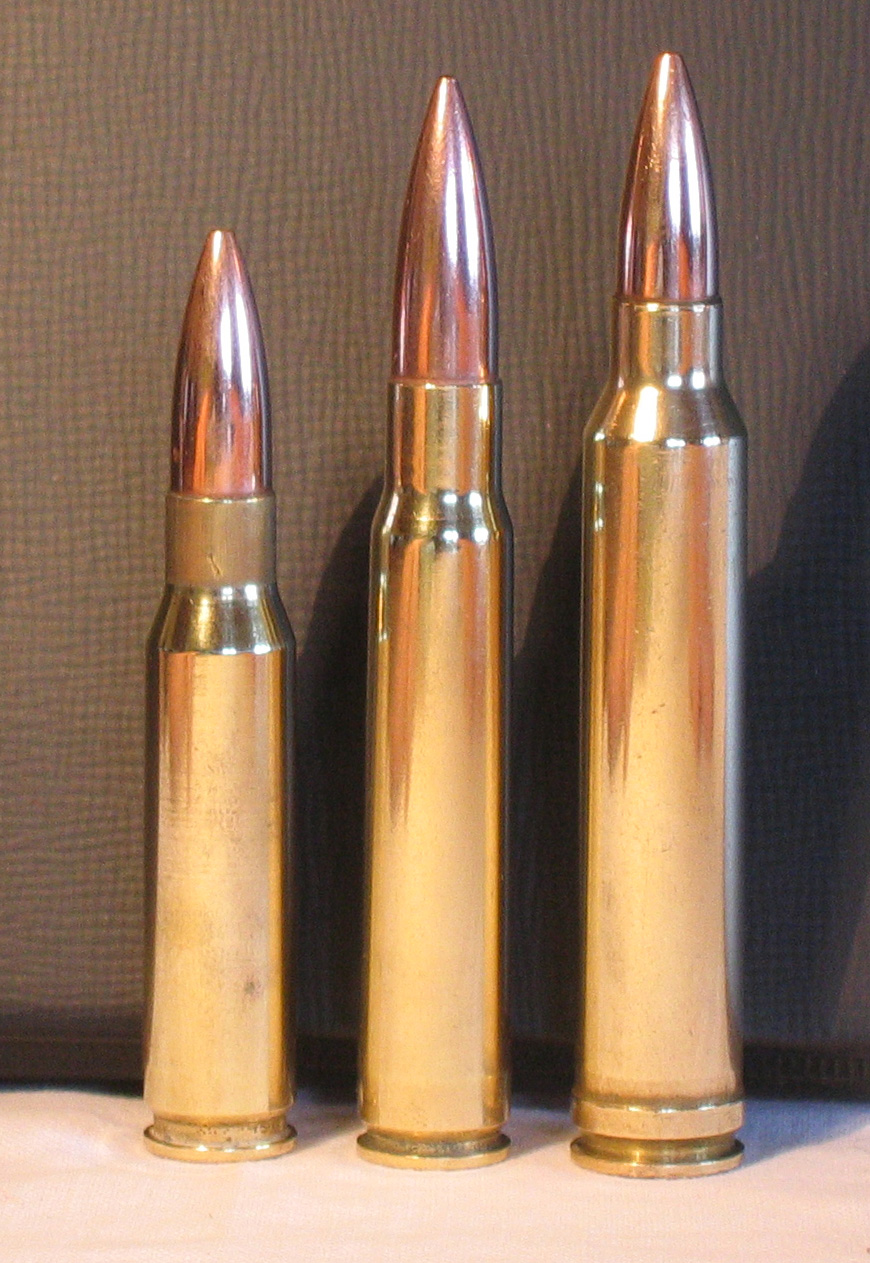
- 8×60mm S cartridge between .308 Winchester (left) and .300 Win Mag (right)
- Type: Rifle
- Place of origin: Weimar Republic

Service history
- In service: Never issued

Production history
- Variants: 8×60mm RS (rimmed)

Specifications
- Parent case: 7.92×57mm Mauser
- Case type: Rimless, bottleneck
- Bullet diameter: 8.22 mm (0.324 in)
- Neck diameter: 9.08 mm (0.357 in)
- Shoulder diameter: 10.95 mm (0.431 in)
- Base diameter: 11.98 mm (0.472 in)
- Rim diameter: 11.95 mm (0.470 in)
- Rim thickness: 1.30 mm (0.051 in)
- Case length: 60.00 mm (2.362 in)
- Overall length: 83.60 mm (3.291 in)
- Case capacity: 4.16 cm^{3} (64.2 gr H_{2}O)
- Rifling twist: 240 mm (1-9.449 in)
- Primer type: Large Rifle
- Maximum pressure: 405 MPa (58,700 psi)

Ballistic performance
Bullet mass/type	Velocity	Energy
11.7 g (181 gr) RWS DK	835 m/s (2,740 ft/s)	4,079 J (3,009 ft⋅lbf)
- Test barrel length: 600 mm (23.6 in); Source: RWS / RUAG Ammotech

The 8×60mm S is a rimless bottlenecked centerfire cartridge of German origin, dating back to the interbellum period between World War I and World War II. The bore has the same dimensions as the German 7.92×57mm Mauser service cartridge (designated as "S-bore"). The 8×60mm S can, due to its 83.6 mm (3.291 in) overall length, easily be chambered in standard sized Mauser 98 bolt-action rifles. In such military M98 bolt actions internal magazine boxes feature a magazine length of 84 mm (3.307 in).

== History ==
After World War I, the Allied forces signed the Treaty of Versailles. This Treaty prohibited the use of standard military weapons and ammunition by Germany. However, civilian hunters didn't want to give up on this round, so a new cartridge was designed by the German arms manufacturer Deutsche Waffen und Munitionsfabriken (DWM). Extending the 7.92×57mm Mauser cartridge case by 3 mm (2 mm of lengthened body plus 1 mm of lengthened neck) created the 8×60mm S. The 8×60mm S bullet diameter is 8.22 mm (.323 in) as found in the 8×57mm IS.

The new cartridge used the same bullet and therefore only the chamber of the rifle had to be modified (reamed out by 2 mm plus 1 mm of neck extension) to accommodate the slightly longer case. This operation was easily performed on Gewehr 98 and Karabiner 98k rifles. It also meant that owners of rifles so re-chambered could not then be used as an "ad hoc" reserve to the German Army (that was one of the issues of concern at Versailles of reserves of male civilians disguised as rifle club members with their own privately owned rifles - being trained as reinforcements in time of war as the German Army was by that Treaty limited not only to 100,000 men but also to the number of rifles it could possess) as standard military ammunition could not now be safely fired in rifles so converted.

=== 8×60mm ===
Since this chamber reaming operation is also possible for earlier I-bore rifles, 8×60mm chambered rifles (without the S or any other further additions) also exist. 8×60mm rifles sport the earlier tighter 8.07 mm (.318 in) I-bore as found in the 8×57mm I.

To avoid potentially serious accidents, it is important to distinguish clearly between cartridges loaded for these two different bullet diameters, and only fire them in appropriately chambered/barrelled rifles.

== Cartridge dimensions ==
The 8×60mm S has 4.16 ml (64 grains) H_{2}O cartridge case capacity. The exterior shape of the case was designed to promote reliable case feeding and extraction in bolt-action rifles, under extreme conditions.

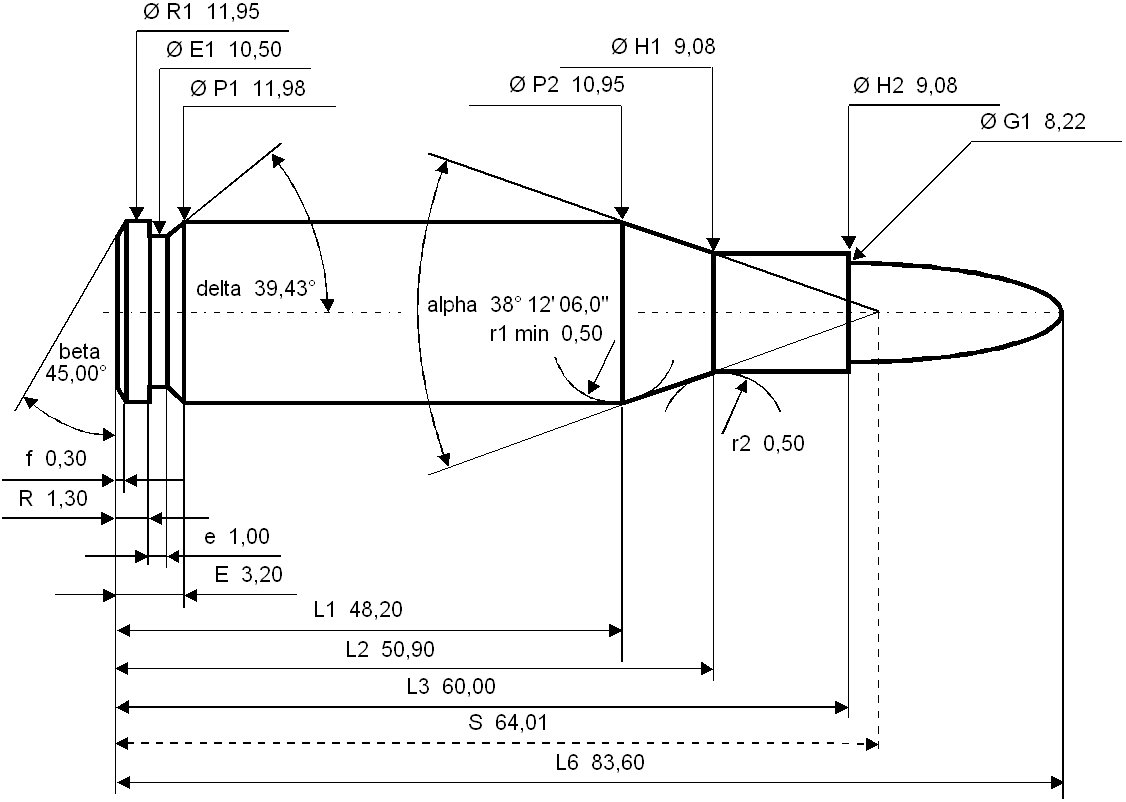

8×60mm S maximum C.I.P. cartridge dimensions. All sizes in millimeters (mm).

Americans would define the shoulder angle at alpha/2 ≈ 19.1 degrees. The common rifling twist rate for this cartridge is 240 mm (1 in 9.45 in), 4 grooves, Ø lands = 7.89 mm, Ø grooves = 8.20 mm, land width = 4.40 mm and the primer type is large rifle.

According to the official C.I.P. rulings, the 8×60mm S can handle up to 405.00 MPa (58,740 psi) P_{max} piezo pressure. In C.I.P. regulated countries every rifle has to be proofed at 125% of this maximum pressure to certify for sale to consumers. This means that 8×60mm S chambered firearms in C.I.P. regulated countries are currently (2016) proof tested at 506.00 MPa (73,389 psi) PE piezo pressure.

== Contemporary use ==
Mostly Mauser Gewehr 98 and Karabiner 98k rifles were rechambered for this caliber. Other rifles, not rarely based on the Mauser action, were chambered for this cartridge too.

The 8×60mm S offers compared to its parent cartridge, the 8×57mm IS, about 1 to 2% extra muzzle velocity due to its slightly larger case capacity and higher maximum operating pressure. This results in a flatter trajectory and better performance at longer range.

The popularity of the 8×60mm S peaked just after World War I and continued throughout the 1930s and 1940s. Today the cartridge is almost obsolete. No or very few rifles are produced for this round. Only two mainstream manufacturers (RWS and Prvi Partizan), along with some other smaller companies like Nolasco and Sologne, continue to produce the cartridge for hunting.

Loaded with short light bullets it can be used on small European game like roe deer and chamois. Loaded with long heavy bullets it can be used on big European game like boar, red deer, moose and brown bear. The 8×60mm S offers very good penetrating ability due to a fast twist rate that enables it to fire long, heavy bullets with a high sectional density. The 8×60mm S can be used in countries which ban civil use of former or current military ammunition. The 8×60mm S's rimmed sister cartridge, the 8×60mm RS, is also not popular in central Europe for the same reasons as the 8×60mm S.

After World War II, while German hunters couldn't use centerfire magazine rifles altogether until the 1950s, the 8×60mm S was very popular in European countries like France and Belgium where until recently the possession of rifles in their original military caliber was tightly regulated. It allowed French licensed gun owners to possess rifles based on the Mauser Gewehr 98 system under the less constraining "hunting rifle" category. This restriction was abolished in France in the mid 2010s and in Belgium a few years earlier.

The also-rare 8×64mm S cartridge offers a comparable rechambering option for Mauser Gewehr 98 and Karabiner 98k rifles sporting 8 mm S-bores. Due to its larger case capacity the 8×64mm S chambering offers better ballistic performance than the 8×60mm S. In such military M98 bolt actions the magazine boxes, however, have to be adapted by a competent gunsmith to function properly with the 8×64mm S cartridge.

Handloaders can also produce this round, by altering a .30-06 Springfield case and using a standard 8 mm bullet. Prvi Partizan is a major supplier of brass components for European 8×60mm S Handloaders.

== See also ==
- List of firearms
- List of rifle cartridges
- List of handgun cartridges
- 8 mm bullet calibre
