= 9.3×64mm Brenneke =

Rifle cartridge

- 9.3×64mm Brenneke FMJ cartridge
- Type: Rifle
- Place of origin: Weimar Republic (Germany)

Production history
- Designer: Wilhelm Brenneke
- Designed: 1927
- Produced: 1927–present

Specifications
- Parent case: none
- Case type: Rimless, bottleneck
- Bullet diameter: 9.30 mm (0.366 in)
- Land diameter: 9.00 mm (0.354 in)
- Neck diameter: 10.04 mm (0.395 in)
- Shoulder diameter: 12.05 mm (0.474 in)
- Base diameter: 12.88 mm (0.507 in)
- Rim diameter: 12.60 mm (0.496 in)
- Rim thickness: 1.30 mm (0.051 in)
- Case length: 64.00 mm (2.520 in)
- Overall length: 85.60 mm (3.370 in)
- Case capacity: 5.71 cm^{3} (88.1 gr H_{2}O)
- Rifling twist: 360 mm (1-14.17 in)
- Primer type: Large rifle magnum
- Maximum pressure: 440.00 MPa (63,817 psi)

Ballistic performance
Bullet mass/type	Velocity	Energy
14.6 g (225 gr) RWS DK	900 m/s (3,000 ft/s)	5,913 J (4,361 ft⋅lbf)
19.0 g (293 gr) RWS UNI Classic	785 m/s (2,580 ft/s)	5,854 J (4,318 ft⋅lbf)
19.0 g (293 gr) Brenneke TUG	785 m/s (2,580 ft/s)	5,854 J (4,318 ft⋅lbf)
- Test barrel length: 650 mm (25.59 in); Source: RWS / RUAG Ammotech

The 9.3×64mm Brenneke (designated as the 9,3 x 64 Brenneke by the C.I.P.) is a rimless bottlenecked centerfire rifle cartridge designed in 1927 by German gunmaker Wilhelm Brenneke. It is suitable for hunting medium to large game animals in Africa, Asia, Europe, and North America.

The 9.3×64mm Brenneke was designed as a medium bore big-game cartridge for standard-sized Mauser 98 bolt-action rifles.

== History ==
One of the most successful cartridge designs of the famous German gun and ammunition designer Wilhelm Brenneke was the 9.3×64mm Brenneke. He designed this cartridge ex novo (the 9.3×64mm Brenneke has no other cartridge as a parent case) and introduced it commercially in 1927. This big-game cartridge is the most powerful cartridge he designed. The 9.3×64mm Brenneke was designed to have the largest possible case capacity without any shape or dimensional drawbacks that would hamper its chambering and perfect functioning in Mauser Gewehr 98 rifles that were then standard issue in the German military and were also popular sporting rifles.

For functioning in standard-sized Mauser 98 rifles besides common rechambering alterations, the internal magazine boxes have to be adapted by a competent gunsmith to function properly with 9.3×64mm Brenneke cartridges since the cases are longer and have a larger diameter than the 7.92×57mm Mauser military cartridges. Short sub 84 mm (3.31 in) overall length 9.3×64mm Brenneke loads using relatively blunt nose bullets (or later short ogive cone points), should fit in the standard-sized M98 action without any need for magazine length alterations or milling of the action behind the lower lug rebate, but such incorrectly altered standard-sized M98 action rifles can not handle 85.6 mm (3.37 in) long full length 9.3×64mm Brenneke loads.

The widespread availability of standard-size Mauser 98 rifles in central Europe and the fact that the .375 H&H Magnum cartridge and its necked-down version the .300 H&H Magnum with approximately 72.4 mm case length and 91.4 mm (3.60 in) overall length were too long to fit in standard-sized Mauser 98 bolt-action rifles made the shorter 9.3×64mm Brenneke an interesting chambering option for European big-game hunters.

Brenneke introduced the 9.3×64mm Brenneke with a 19.65-gram (303 gr) Torpedo Ideal Geschoss (TIG – Torpedo Ideal projectile) designed for big game and a 17-gram (262 gr) jacketed bullet with lead, bronze or a copper tip for smaller game. Later a special TIG with a bronze tip and a full metal jacket bullet where added for thick skinned dangerous game. After that Brenneke developed a 19-gram (293 gr) Torpedo Universal Geschoss (TUG – Torpedo Universal projectile) with a lead tip that is still produced.

In 2009, the Russian military developed the semi-armour-piercing 9SN cartridge for the 9.3×64mm Brenneke SVDK variant of the Dragunov sniper rifle. This cartridge has a 16.6 g (256 gr) pointed boat-tailed FMJ bullet with a steel core and achieves a muzzle velocity of 770 m/s (2520 ft/s). The 9SN cartridge should be able to defeat body armour at ranges up to 600 metres (660 yd).

The ballistic performance of the 9.3×64mm Brenneke is similar to the .375 H&H Magnum while being smaller and using less propellant - it has 8% less case capacity, making it a more modern, efficient design.

With the official certification of the 6.5×63mm Messner Magnum this German 64 mm "family" of magnum rifle cartridges that all share the same basic cartridge case got expanded 71 years later.

The cartridges in this German 64 mm cartridge "family" are, in the order of development:

- 9.3×64mm Brenneke (1927)
- 6.5×63mm Messner Magnum (2002)

== Cartridge dimensions ==
The 9.3×64mm Brenneke has 5.71 ml (88 grains) H_{2}O cartridge case capacity. A rare feature of this German rimless bottlenecked centerfire cartridge design is that it has a slightly rebated rim (P1 - R1 = 0.28 mm). A sign of the era in which the 9.3×64mm Brenneke was developed are the gently sloped shoulders. The exterior shape of the case was designed to promote reliable case feeding and extraction in bolt-action rifles, under extreme conditions.

9.3×64mm Brenneke maximum C.I.P. cartridge dimensions. All sizes in millimetres (mm).

Americans would define the shoulder angle at alpha/2 ≈ 17.49 degrees. Ø lands = 9.00 mm, Ø grooves = 9.28 mm, land width = 4.60 mm, 4 grooves, the common rifling twist rate for this cartridge is 360 mm (1-14.17 in), and the primer type is large rifle magnum.

According to the official Commission Internationale Permanente pour l'Epreuve des Armes à Feu Portatives (C.I.P.) rulings the 9.3×64mm Brenneke case can handle up to 440.00 MPa (63,817 psi) piezo pressure. In C.I.P. regulated countries every rifle cartridge combo has to be proofed at 125% of this maximum C.I.P. pressure to certify for sale to consumers. This means that 9.3×64mm Brenneke chambered arms in C.I.P. regulated countries are currently (2018) proof tested at 550.00 MPa (79,771 psi) PE piezo pressure.

== The 9.3×64mm Brenneke in field use ==
The 9.3×64mm Brenneke is a powerful cartridge and its ballistic performance is similar to the .375 H&H Magnum. Like every other big-game cartridge it produces a stout recoil. An appropriate fitting stock and an effective muzzle brake will help to reduce recoil induced problems. An advantage of the 9.3×64mm Brenneke cartridge is that it can be chambered in standard sized bolt-action rifles.

German big-game hunters often use the 9.3×64mm Brenneke for hunting plains game and Big Five game in Africa, whereas British and American hunters choose the .375 H&H Magnum or similar cartridges. As the 9.3×64mm Brenneke is a pure civil cartridge, it can be used in countries which ban civil use of former or current military cartridges. The 9.3×64mm Brenneke has a good accuracy potential of 1 moa (0.3 mil) or better.

There are not many factory loads available. After World War II, only the 19-gram (293 gr) TUG was produced by the Brenneke Company and later an 18.5-gram (285 gr) round nose and a 16-gram Torpedo Optimal Geschoss (TOG – Torpedeo Optimal projectile) bullet were offered. With these loads the 9.3×64mm Brenneke gained a good reputation amongst German hunters on their big-game safaris.

The German ammunition manufacturer RWS also offers two factory loads. In America A-Square offered the 9.3×64mm Brenneke loaded with 18.5-gram (285 gr) lion load, 18.5-gram (285 gr) dead tough and 18.5-gram (285 gr) monolithic solid bullets.

Due to its good field reputation and flexibility, the 9.3×64mm Brenneke is often used by reloaders. They have used this cartridge extensively to create powerful loads by handloading. Whilst staying within the C.I.P. pressure limit of 440 MPa, the 9.3×64mm Brenneke cartridge can be handloaded to propel bullets ranging from 10 to 21 g (154 to 324 gr) for all kinds of hunting.

When loaded with light bullets, the 9.3×64mm Brenneke cartridge can be used to hunt small to medium game. Heavy bullet loadings offer enough velocity and energy to hunt dangerous game. The 9.3×64mm Brenneke with appropriate bullets is suitable for hunting any game animal on the planet, though certain sub-Saharan Africa countries have a 9.53 mm (0.375 in) minimum calibre requirement for hunting dangerous Big Five game—i.e. leopard, lion, cape buffalo, black rhinoceros, and African elephant. Several African countries allow the use of 9.3×64mm Brenneke cartridge for hunting big-game, making it a flexible safari cartridge.

Apart from hunting the cartridge can be used for last resort defence against dangerous class 3 game, particularly the great bears including grizzly, polar and brown bears.

== The 9.3×64mm Brenneke as parent case ==
=== 6.5×63mm Messner Magnum ===
The 9.3×64mm Brenneke case functioned as the parent case for the 6.5×63mm Messner Magnum, which is essentially a 6.5 mm (.264 in) necked-down version of the 9.3×64mm Brenneke. The wildcat status of the 6.5×63mm Messner Magnum ended in 2002, when it was C.I.P. certified and became an officially registered and sanctioned member of the German 64 mm "family" of magnum rifle cartridges.

The 6.5×63mm Messner Magnum has 5.42 ml (83.5 grains) water cartridge case capacity.

6.5×63mm Messner Magnum maximum C.I.P. cartridge dimensions. All sizes in millimetres (mm).

Americans would define the shoulder angle at alpha/2 = 29 degrees. The common rifling twist rate for this cartridge is 200 mm (1 in 7.87 in), 6 grooves, Ø lands = 6.45 mm, Ø grooves = 6.70 mm, land width = 3.50 mm and the primer type is large rifle magnum.

According to the official C.I.P. guidelines the 6.5×63mm Messner Magnum case can handle up to 440 MPa (64,000 psi) piezo pressure.

The idea behind the 6.5×63mm Messner Magnum was to develop a very powerful 6.5 mm long range hunting cartridge that achieves very high muzzle velocities out of relatively short 600 mm (23.6 in) long rifle barrels. The developer, Joseph Messner from France, chose the 9.3×64mm Brenneke as parent case, since it offers enough case capacity and a competent gunsmith can relatively easy rechamber a standard Mauser 98 or any other bolt-action rifle to accept 9.3×64mm Brenneke based cartridges. Beside the 6.5×63mm Messner Magnum rimless rifle cartridge, Messner also designed a rimmed version for break action rifles of the cartridge called the 6.5×63mmR Messner Magnum.

Due to the large case capacity in relation to the 6.5 mm (.264 inch) calibre bore size the 6.5×63mm Messner Magnum is very harsh on barrels. It typically wears out a rifle barrel in 500 to 1000 rounds. A lot of thorough barrel cleaning (after every 5 shots) and carefully avoiding long strings of shots help to minimize barrel wear. This makes this cartridge impractical for most competition shooters who tend to fire a lot of rounds in practice to acquire and maintain expert long-range marksmanship.

The German 6.5×68mm cartridge introduced in 1939 and the American .264 Winchester Magnum cartridge introduced in 1959 are probably the closest ballistic twins of the 6.5×63mm Messner Magnum and both are more widely available to purchase at retail.

=== .376 Steyr ===
Another commercial cartridge that uses the 9.3×64mm Brenneke as parent cartridge is the .376 Steyr. This is essentially a shortened 9.3×64mm Brenneke cartridge necked-up to 9.5 mm (.375 in) calibre developed as an evolution of Jeff Cooper's "Super Scout" medium rifle concept, which was in turn an extension of his original scout rifle concept. With a higher felt recoil, the .376 Steyr is the largest practical cartridge for use in a short, lightweight weapon such as the Steyr Scout rifle.

=== Wildcats ===
Cartridges that are not officially registered with nor sanctioned by C.I.P. (Commission Internationale Permanente Pour L'Epreuve Des Armes A Feu Portative) or its American equivalent, SAAMI (Sporting Arms and Ammunition Manufacturers' Institute) are generally known as wildcats. By blowing out standard factory cases, the wildcatter generally hopes to gain extra muzzle velocity by increasing the case capacity of the factory parent cartridge case by a few percent. Practically there can be some muzzle velocity gained by this method, but the measured results between parent cartridges and their 'improved' wildcat offspring is often marginal. Besides changing the shape and internal volume of the parent cartridge case, wildcatters also can change the original calibre. A reason to change the original calibre can be to comply with a minimal permitted calibre or bullet weight for the legal hunting of certain species of game.

Wildcats are not governed by C.I.P. or SAAMI rules so wildcatters can capitalize the achievable high operating pressures. Because the 9.3×64mm Brenneke offers a pressure-resistant cartridge case that can relatively easily be reloaded with primers, powder and bullets and hence be reused several times, it has become quite popular amongst wildcatters.

An example of a 9.3×64mm Brenneke-based wildcat is the 8mm Mázon. It was designed by Álvaro Mazón from Spain. This is essentially an 8 mm (.323 in) necked-down version of the 9.3×64mm Brenneke.

A .338/8.5 mm caliber 9.3×64mm Brenneke-based wildcat example is the 8.5×64mm. The 8.5×64mm has 5.67 ml (87.5 grains) H_{2}O cartridge case capacity. It was designed in 2001 by Lutz Möller from Germany to fire mono metal bullets also designed by Lutz Möller and other bullets. The chambering was designed to give excellent penetration terminal ballistics as the .333 Jeffery and various .338 magnums, while fitting standard Mauser Gewehr 98 sized rifles with 9.3×64mm Brenneke sized magazine boxes.

A .30 caliber 9.3×64mm Brenneke-based wildcat example is the .30 Hembrook Long. It was designed in 2005 by Robert Hembrook of San Antonio, Texas. The finished case was designed to give similar ballistics to the various .300 magnums while having a usable length neck, and fitting standard Mauser Gewehr 98 sized magazine boxes.

== See also ==
- 9.3×62mm
- 9.3×74mmR
- List of rifle cartridges
- 9 mm caliber
- Brenneke
- 7×64mm
- 8×64mm S
- SVDK
