= Brenneke =

German manufacturer of ammunition and bullets

Wilhelm Brenneke GmbH & Co. KG.
- Company type: GmbH & Co. KG (Companies register: Hannover local court, no.: HRB 9000)
- Founded: 1895
- Founder: Wilhelm Brenneke
- Headquarters: Langenhagen, Lower Saxony, Germany
- Key people: Dr. Peter Mank, Managing Director and owner; Agnes Mank († 25 october 2010), managing director
- Products: Ammunition for hunting, marksmanship and law enforcement; Bullets for Handloading
- Subsidiaries: Brenneke of America, L.P. in Clinton, Iowa, United States
- Website: brenneke.com (International) brennekeusa.com (Brenneke of America)

Brenneke GmbH is a German manufacturer of ammunition and bullets, based in Langenhagen, Lower Saxony.

The company was founded by Wilhelm Brenneke in 1895 and is currently owned and run by his great-grandson, Dr. Peter Mank.

Brenneke makes shotgun shells for target shooting and hunting, special slugs for law enforcement, and hunting rounds as well as projectiles for handloading. Its best-known products are the Brenneke slug for shotguns and a line of rifle bullets.

== Langenhagen standard ==
In 1990 under the sponsorship of Brenneke, the Langenhagen standard (German: Langenhagener Norm) was created. Essentially it means that for hunting, the deviation of the shotgun slug must not on a distance of 50 metres (55 yd) exceed a circle with 10 centimetres (3.9 in) diameter. On a drilling, the total deviation of all three barrels must not exceed a circle of 15 centimetres (5.9 in) diameter.

== Rifle bullets ==
All Brenneke rifle bullets have a so-called torpedo-tail (German: Torpedo-Heck), a special form of boat-tail.

The best-known are

- TIG (German: Torpedo Ideal Geschoß), mainly a fragmentation bullet with a soft core for smaller game, developed in 1917-1927.
- TUG (German: Torpedo Universal-Geschoß), mainly a deformation bullet with a hard core for bigger game, developed 1935.

From 1935 to 2003, Brenneke concentrated on improving the Brenneke slug. since 2003, the firm developed the

- TOG (German: Torpedo Optimal-Geschoß) (2003), a deformation-bullet for big game
- TAG (German: Torpedo Alternativ-Geschoß) (2007), a lead-free deformation bullet.

Lead-free versions of TIG and TUG are built as "TIG nature" and "TUG nature".

=== Brenneke TIG and TUG against RWS ID and UNI ===
From 1972 until 2006, those were manufactured and developed in license by RWS; in 2006, the license was not renewed, and RWS began marketing the bullets as ID-Classic resp. UNI-Classic from 1 July 2006 onward. In February 2009, Brenneke declared it saw ID-Classic and UNI-classic as counterfeit consumer goods and launched a lawsuit against RUAG Amotec.

Brenneke markets the bullets, as well as ammunition, from a different manufacturer under its own name now.

== Calibers ==
Wilhelm Brenneke developed some rifle cartridges. Normally, those have a brass length of 64 millimetres (2.5 in) rimless resp. 65 millimetres (2.6 in) flanged for combination guns and other break-action-rifles that are still popular with European hunters. Those calibers are in exclusive civil use; thus, they are tremendously popular in countries that ban military calibers like France. Those are:

- 7×64mm / 7x65mm R (1917–1927)
- 8×64mm S (1912) / 8x65mm RS
- 9.3×64mm Brenneke (1927)
