= Wilhelm Brenneke =

German ammunition designer and inventor (1865–1951)

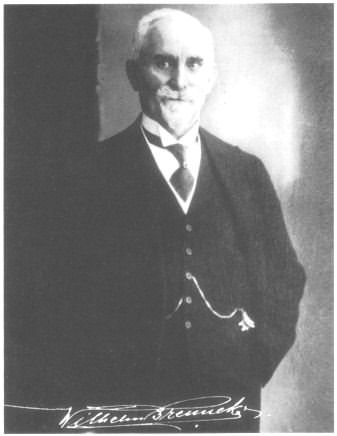
- Born: 30 March 1865; Hanover, Germany
- Died: 4 November 1951 (aged 86); Leipzig, Germany
- Occupations: Ammunition designer; inventor
- Known for: Shotgun slug; Brenneke

Wilhelm Brenneke (30 March 1865 – 4 November 1951) was a German ammunition designer and inventor of small arms ammunition, best known for inventing the modern shotgun slug in 1898. He founded Brenneke, an ammunition manufacturer, in 1895.

== Life ==
Wilhelm Brenneke was born on 30 March 1865 in Hanover, Germany. He died on 4 November 1951 in Leipzig, from natural causes. The Brenneke company remains in his family's hands and is still successful.

== Cartridge designs ==
At the start of the 20th century, Brenneke was experimenting with the engineering concept of lengthening and other dimensional changes regarding standard cartridge cases like the M/88 cartridge case, then used by the German military in their Mauser Gewehr 98 rifles, to obtain extra muzzle velocity.

=== 8×64mm S ===
In 1912 Brenneke designed the commercially rather unsuccessful 8×64mm S cartridge de novo (the 8×64mm S has no other cartridge as parent case). This cartridge is an example of a de novo rifle cartridge intended as a ballistic upgrade option for the Mauser Gewehr 98 rifles that were then standard issue in the German military. The exterior cartridge case dimensions like overall length and slightly larger case head diameter compared to the German 8×57mm IS military cartridge coupled with a moderate increase in maximum pressure were chosen with easy conversion of Gewehr 98 rifles for the 8x64mm S in mind. The German military chose however to stick to their 8×57mm IS rifle cartridge avoiding rechambering their service rifles for a cartridge that due to its more favourable bore area to case volume ratio ballistically would outperform the .30-06 Springfield cartridge of the United States Army. Brenneke's engineering concept to enlarge exterior cartridge case dimensions compared to the German 8×57mm IS military cartridge case coupled to an increase in maximum pressure to create new for those days very powerful cartridges was essentially sound and he persisted in the development of new cartridges along this line.

Besides the 8×64mm S Brenneke also developed a 8×64mm variant suitable for use in a differing 8 mm bore. Rifles chambered for the 8×64mm sport the earlier tighter 8.07 mm (.318 in) I-bore as found in the 8×57mm I.

In 1914 Brenneke introduced rimmed variants for break action rifles of the 8×64mm S and 8×64mm rimless variants. These rimmed variants are known as the 8×65mRS and 8×65mmR.

=== 7×64mm ===
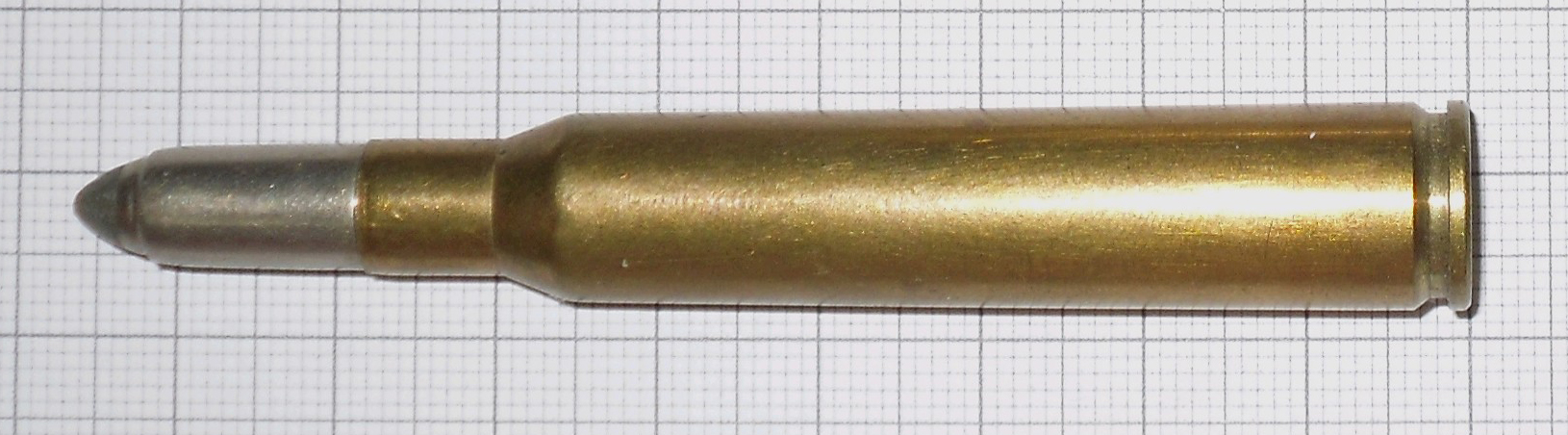
7×64mm rifle cartridge

In 1917 Brenneke necked down his 8x64mm S design of 1912 to 7 mm calibre and introduced it as 7×64mm and achieved a major commercial success. The 7×64mm offered 10 to 12% extra muzzle velocity over the 7×57mm producing a flatter trajectory and greater long range performance. In the years between World War I and World War II the 7×64mm was often regarded by German hunters as a “miracle cartridge” and dozens of different factory loads were available on the German market. It was that highly regarded the German Wehrmacht (Army) during the 1930s even considered replacing the 8×57mm IS in favour for the 7×64mm for their snipers. The Wehrmacht decided - just like the German army in 1912 - to stick to the 8×57mm IS cartridge for their Mauser Karabiner 98k to keep things as simple as possible in their logistical chain.

Beside the 7×64mm rifle cartridge Brenneke also designed a rimmed version for break action rifles of the cartridge in 1917. The rimmed 7×65mmR variant of the cartridge was also immediately a commercial success.

=== 9.3×64mm Brenneke ===
9.3×64mm Brenneke rifle cartridge

In 1927 Brenneke designed the 9.3×64mm Brenneke cartridge de novo (the 9.3×64mm Brenneke has no other cartridge as parent case). This big-game cartridge was commercially introduced in 1927 and is the most powerful cartridge Brenneke designed. The 9.3×64mm Brenneke was designed to have the largest possible case capacity without any shape or dimensional drawbacks that would hamper its chambering and perfect functioning in Mauser M 98 bolt actions used in the Gewehr 98 rifles that were then standard issue in the German military.

In the 21st century the Russian military developed the semi-armour-piercing 9SN cartridge for the 9.3×64mm Brenneke SVDK variant of the Dragunov sniper rifle. This cartridge has a 16.6 g (256 gr) pointed boat-tailed FMJ bullet with steel core and achieves a muzzle velocity of 770 m/s (2520 ft/s). The 9SN cartridge should be able to defeat body armor at ranges up to 600 metres (660 yards).
