= 49th Missouri Infantry Regiment (Union) =

- 35-star United States flag (1863)
- Active: 1864 – 1865
- Country: United States
- Allegiance: (United States) Union; Missouri
- Branch: Union Army
- Type: Infantry
- Size: Regiment
- Engagements: American Civil War; Price's Missouri Expedition (1864); Battle of Spanish Fort (1865)

Commanders
- Notable commanders: David Patterson Dyer

The 49th Missouri Volunteer Infantry Regiment (Federal) was an infantry unit from Missouri that served in the Union Army during the latter part of the American Civil War. The regiment was organized in August and September 1864 at Warrenton, Missouri to serve for 12 months under Col. David Patterson Dyer. The unit participated in the defense of Missouri during the 1864 Price Raid and afterwards was assigned to defend various points in central and northeastern Missouri. In February, 1865 the regiment was brought together and moved south to participate in the Mobile Campaign, including the battle of Spanish Fort. Following the close of the war the unit was garrisoned at Montgomery, Alabama. Most of the regiment was mustered out of service in August 1865 except for two companies that were retained at Eufaula, Alabama until December, 1865. During its service the 49th Missouri Infantry Regiment lost 100 men, primarily due to disease.

Among the officers was Capt. Louis A. Benecke who served as commander of Company I.

And Capt. William T. Colbert who served as commander of Company A.

== See also ==
- List of Missouri Union Civil War units
