= Beneke =

Beneke is a surname. Notable people with the surname include:

- Donald Beneke (1916–1990), American politician from Iowa
- Everett Smith Beneke (1918–2010), American medical mycologist
- Friedrich Eduard Beneke (1798 – c. 1854), German psychologist and philosopher
- Martin Beneke (born 1966), German physicist
- Paul Beneke (early 1400s - c. 1480), German town councilor and privateer
- Tex Beneke (1914–2000), American saxophonist, singer and bandleader

== Fiction ==
- Ted Beneke
