= SVDK =

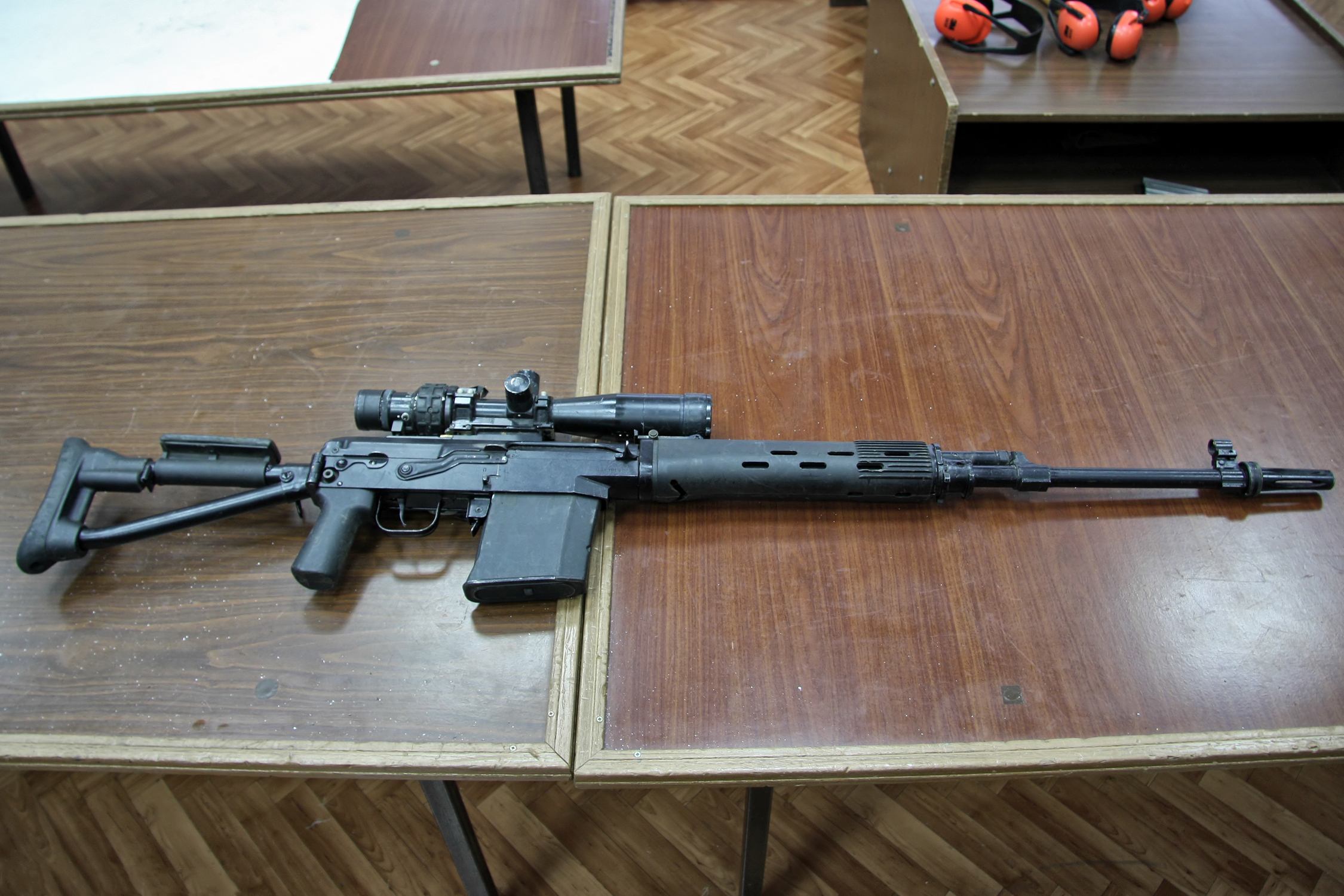
- SVDK right view
- Type: Precision rifle/Sniper Rifle
- Place of origin: Russia

Service history
- In service: 2006-Present
- Used by: Russia

Production history
- Designer: TSNIITOCHMASH
- Designed: 1990s
- Manufacturer: Izhevsk machine-building plant
- Produced: 2006-Present

Specifications
- Mass: 6.5 kg (14 lb) (when the telescopic sight is not mounted)
- Length: 1,250 mm (49 in)
- Barrel length: 620 mm (24 in)
- Cartridge: 9.3×64mm 7N33
- Action: Gas-operated, rotating bolt
- Muzzle velocity: ~ 780 m/s
- Effective firing range: 1000 m
- Feed system: 10-round detachable box magazine
- Sights: 3-10X 1P70 "Giperion" telescopic sight and iron sights.

SVDK (Russian: СВДК, GRAU index 6V9), the "Dragunov sniper rifle, large-calibre" (Снайперская винтовка Драгунова крупнокалиберная), is a Russian precision rifle from the SVD rifle family chambered for the 9.3×64mm 7N33 cartridge.

== Description ==
The Dragunov SVDK large-caliber sniper rifle was developed through "Vzlomshik" (Breaker) research and development program, along with 7.62 mm SV-98 sniper and 12.7 mm ASVK anti-materiel rifles. The purpose of SVDK is to deal with targets which are too hard for standard 7.62×54mmR sniper rifles like SV-98 or SVD, such as assault troops in heavy body armor or enemy snipers behind cover. There were also rumors that the SVDK will serve as a long-range anti-personnel weapon.

The effective range of the SVDK is cited as 'about 600 meters'.

It has heavy barrel with six right grooves (365mm twist rate), new folding gunstock with rubber recoil pad, a plastic handguard with folding bipod and new standard optical sight.

== Variants ==
- Tigr-9 («Тигр-9») - developed in 1999, civilian hunting rifle with 5-round detachable box magazine.

== Users ==
- Russia - after tests and trials SVDK was adopted by the Russian army in 2006
- Serbia Used by Serbian Special forces

== See also ==
- List of Russian weaponry
- OSV-96
