= 7×64mm =

German hunting rifle cartridge

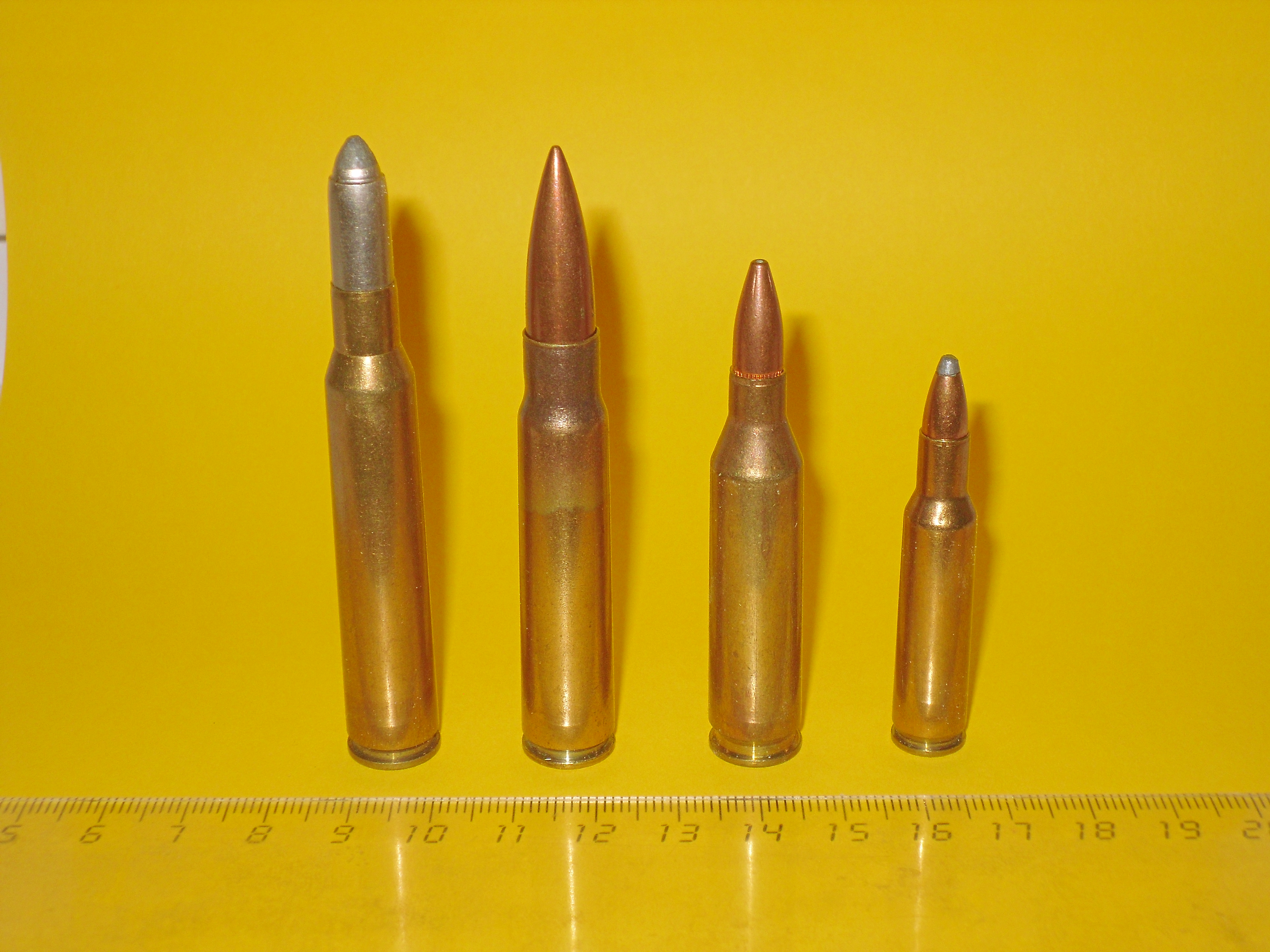
- From left to right 7×64mm, 7.92×57mm Mauser, .243 Winchester and .222 Remington
- Type: Rifle
- Place of origin: German Empire

Service history
- In service: Never issued

Production history
- Designer: Wilhelm Brenneke
- Designed: 1917
- Produced: 1917–present
- Variants: 7×65mmR (rimmed)

Specifications
- Parent case: 8×64mm S
- Case type: Rimless, bottleneck
- Bullet diameter: 7.25 mm (0.285 in)
- Neck diameter: 7.95 mm (0.313 in)
- Shoulder diameter: 10.80 mm (0.425 in)
- Base diameter: 11.85 mm (0.467 in)
- Rim diameter: 11.95 mm (0.470 in)
- Rim thickness: 1.30 mm (0.051 in)
- Case length: 64.00 mm (2.520 in)
- Overall length: 84.00 mm (3.307 in)
- Case capacity: 4.48 cm^{3} (69.1 gr H_{2}O)
- Rifling twist: 220 mm (1-8.66")
- Primer type: Large rifle
- Maximum pressure (C.I.P.): 415.00 MPa (60,191 psi)
- Maximum pressure (SAAMI): 379.21 MPa (55,000 psi)
- Maximum CUP: 50,500 CUP

Ballistic performance
Bullet mass/type	Velocity	Energy
9.1 g (140 gr) SP	914 m/s (3,000 ft/s)	3,810 J (2,810 ft⋅lbf)
10.0 g (154 gr) SP	880 m/s (2,900 ft/s)	3,901 J (2,877 ft⋅lbf)
11.3 g (174 gr) SP	820 m/s (2,700 ft/s)	3,841 J (2,833 ft⋅lbf)
11.2 g (173 gr) RWS HMK	867 m/s (2,840 ft/s)	4,209 J (3,104 ft⋅lbf)
- Source: "Cartridges of the World"

7×65mmR

Specifications
- Case type: Rimmed, bottlenecked
- Bullet diameter: 7.25 mm (0.285 in)
- Neck diameter: 7.95 mm (0.313 in)
- Shoulder diameter: 10.80 mm (0.425 in)
- Base diameter: 11.89 mm (0.468 in)
- Rim diameter: 13.32 mm (0.524 in)
- Rim thickness: 1.40 mm (0.055 in)
- Case length: 65.00 mm (2.559 in)
- Overall length: 78.00 mm (3.071 in)
- Case capacity: 4.53 cm^{3} (69.9 gr H_{2}O)
- Rifling twist: 220 mm (1 in 8.66 in)
- Primer type: Large rifle
- Maximum pressure (C.I.P.): 380.00 MPa (55,114 psi)

The 7×64mm (also unofficially known as the 7×64mm Brenneke, though its designer's name was never officially added as a part of the cartridge name) is a rimless bottlenecked centerfire cartridge developed for hunting. As is customary in European cartridges, the 7 denotes the 7 mm bore diameter and the 64 denotes the 64 mm (2.5 in) case length. The 7×64mm is a popular hunting cartridge in Central Europe due to its 11.95 mm (0.470 in) case head diameter and 84 mm (3.3 in) overall length allowing it to easily be chambered in the standard length actions.

== History ==
At the start of the 20th century the famous German gun and ammunition designer Wilhelm Brenneke (1865–1951) was experimenting with the engineering concept of lengthening and other dimensional changes regarding standard cartridge cases like the M/88 cartridge case, then used by the German military in their Mauser Gewehr 98 rifles, to obtain extra muzzle velocity.

In 1912, Brenneke designed the commercially rather unsuccessful 8×64mm S cartridge (again in production since 2001). It was intended as a ballistic upgrade option for the Mauser Gewehr 98 rifles that were standard issue in the German military. The German military chose, however, to stay with their 8×57mm IS rifle cartridge avoiding rechambering their service rifles for a cartridge that, due to its more favourable bore area to case volume ratio, would ballistically outperform the .30-06 Springfield cartridge of the United States Army. Brenneke’s engineering concept was to create new, very powerful (for the era) cartridges by enlarging exterior cartridge case dimensions like overall length and slightly larger case head diameter compared to the German 8×57mm IS military cartridge case, coupled with an increase in maximum pressure. The concept was essentially sound, and he persisted in the development of new cartridges along this line.

In 1917 Brenneke necked down his 8×64mm S design of 1912 to 7 mm calibre, introduced it as the 7×64mm, and achieved major commercial success. The 7×64mm offered 10-12% more muzzle velocity than the 7×57mm Mauser. This results in a flatter trajectory and better performance at longer range. In the years between World War I and World War II, the 7×64mm was often regarded by German hunters as a "miracle cartridge", and dozens of different factory loads were available on the German market. It was so highly regarded that the Nazi German Wehrmacht, during the 1930s, even considered replacing the 8×57mm IS in favour of the 7×64mm for their snipers. The Wehrmacht decided — just like the German Army had in 1912 — to stay with the 8×57mm IS cartridges for their Mauser Karabiner 98ks to keep logistics as simple as possible.

Besides the 7×64mm rifle cartridge, Brenneke also designed a rimmed version for break action rifles such as double rifles and combination rifles, as well as for single shot rifles in 1917. The rimmed 7×65mmR variant of the cartridge was also immediately a commercial success.

In countries where military service cartridges are banned for civil ownership, the 7×64 Brenneke is a successful cartridge for hunting and marksmanship.

== Cartridge dimensions ==
The 7×64mm has a 4.48 ml (69 grain H_{2}O) cartridge case capacity. A sign of the era in which the 7×64mm was developed is the gently sloped shoulders. The exterior shape of the case was designed to promote reliable case feeding and extraction in bolt-action rifles, under extreme conditions.

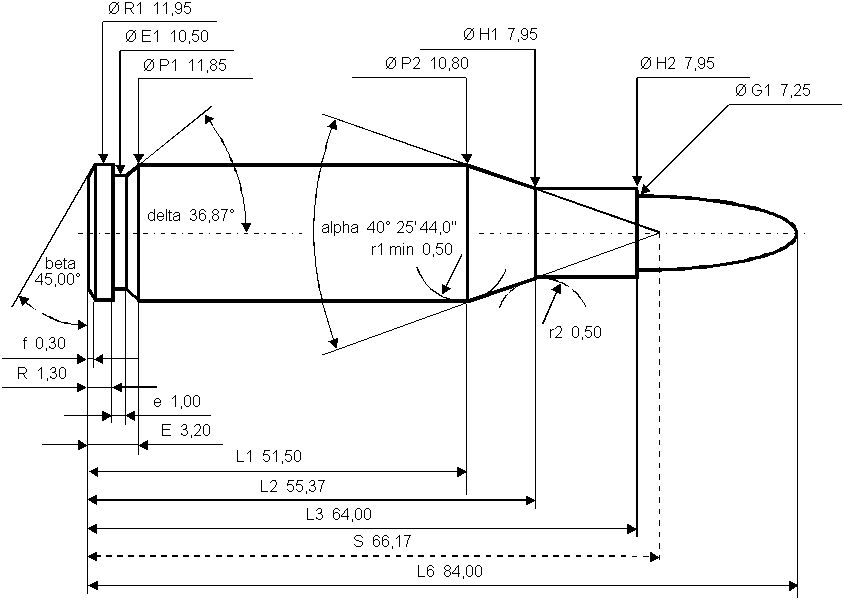

7×64mm maximum C.I.P. cartridge dimensions. All sizes in millimeters (mm).

Americans would define the shoulder angle at alpha/2 ≈ 20.42 degrees. The common rifling twist rate for this cartridge is 220 mm (1 in 8.66 in), 4 grooves, Ø lands = 6.98 mm, Ø grooves = 7.24 mm, land width = 3.70 mm and the primer type is large rifle or large rifle magnum depending on the load.

According to the official C.I.P. (Commission Internationale Permanente pour l'Epreuve des Armes à Feu Portatives) rulings the 7×64mm Mauser can handle up to 415.00 MPa (60,191 psi) P_{max} piezo pressure. In C.I.P. regulated countries every rifle cartridge combination has to be proofed at 125% of this maximum C.I.P. pressure to certify for sale to consumers. This means that 7×64mm Mauser chambered arms in C.I.P. regulated countries were, as of 2014, proof tested at 519.00 MPa (75,275 psi) PE piezo pressure.

The SAAMI maximum average pressure (MAP) for this cartridge is 55,000 psi (379.21 MPa) piezo pressure.

The American .280 Remington cartridge is probably the closest ballistic twin of the 7×64mm. When compared to the 7×64mm, the .280 Remington has a slightly lower maximum allowed chamber pressure and as an American 7 mm cartridge has a slightly smaller groove diameter. European 7 mm cartridges all have 7.24 mm (0.285 in) grooves Ø diameter. American 7mm cartridges have 7.21 mm (0.284 in) grooves Ø.

== Contemporary use ==
The 7×64mm is one of the favoured rifle cartridges in Central Europe, and is offered as a chambering option in every major European hunting rifle manufacturer's product palette. The versatility of the 7×64mm for hunting all kinds of European game and the availability of numerous factory loads all attribute to the 7×64mm chambering's popularity. Loaded with short, light bullets, it can be used on small European game like fox and geese or medium game such as roe deer and chamois. Loaded with long, heavy bullets, it can be used on big European game like boar, red deer, moose and brown bear. The 7×64mm offers very good penetrating ability due to a fast twist rate that enables it to fire long, heavy bullets with a high sectional density. The 7×64mm's rimmed sister cartridge, the 7×65mmR, is also very popular in Central Europe for the same reasons as the 7×64mm. The legal banning of ex-military service cartridges like the .308 Winchester, 7×57mm Mauser, 8×57mm I, 8×57mm IS and the .30-06 Springfield in countries like France and Belgium also promoted acceptance and use of the 7×64mm and the 7×65mmR.

== See also ==
- List of rifle cartridges
- Table of handgun and rifle cartridges
- 7 mm caliber
- .280 Remington
- 8×64mm S
- 9.3×64mm Brenneke
