= Beneck =

Beneck is a surname. Notable people with the surname include:

- Anna Beneck (1942–2013), Italian swimmer
- Daniela Beneck (born 1946), Italian swimmer
