= Louis Benecke =

American businessman, lawyer, and politician

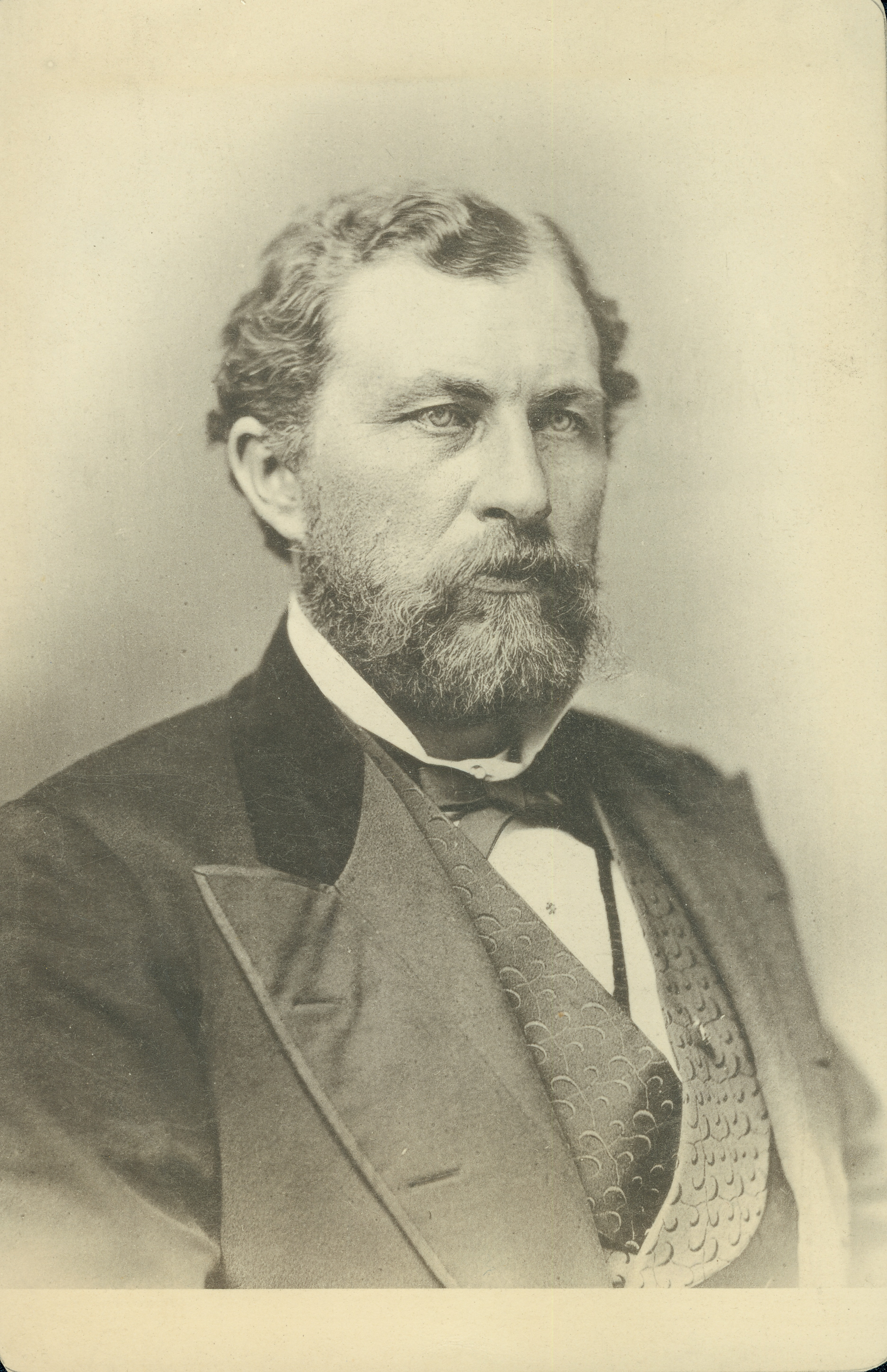

Member of the Missouri Senate
- In office 1869–1875

Personal details
- Born: May 1, 1843 Stiege, Duchy of Brunswick, Germany
- Died: August 29, 1919 (aged 76) Brunswick, Missouri, U.S.
- Party: Republican
- Relatives: Robert Benecke (brother)
- Occupation: Politician, businessman, lawyer

Military service
- Allegiance: United States (Union)
- Branch/service: United States Army (Union army)
- Rank: Captain
- Unit: 49th Missouri Infantry Regiment
- Battles/wars: American Civil War

Louis Benecke (May 1, 1843 – August 29, 1919) was an American businessman, lawyer, and politician.

== Biography ==
Benecke was born in Stiege, Duchy of Brunswick. In 1856, Benecke emigrated with his family to the United States and settled in Brunswick, Missouri. During the American Civil War, he served in the Union Army in the 18th Missouri Volunteer Infantry Regiment and the 49th Missouri Volunteer Infantry Regiment. Benecke was admitted to the Missouri bar and practiced law in Brunswick, Missouri. Due to obstacles created to deter African American Civil War widows from filing pension claims, many of these former slaves sought the legal help of Louis Benecke. Unable to read or write, filing for Civil War pensions was all but impossible without a lawyer. Unfortunately, these vulnerable women who sought support for their orphaned children were robbed by lawyers, including Louis Benecke. The Department of the Treasury would not send pension payments directly to formerly enslaved widows. Payments were sent to their lawyers. Roseann Wright Outlaw was one such widow. After her husband Daniel Outlaw (United States Colored Infantry Reg 65, Company K) died of smallpox while on duty in Baton Rouge, Louisiana, Roseanne sought the legal services of Louis Beneke. Like many other USCI widows, Beneke stole most of her pension. So vast was Benecke's thievery that a case went all the way to the Supreme Court. The African American widows lost due to a post reconstruction Supreme Court. He was also involved in the banking, telephone, and manufacturing businesses. Benecke served on the Brunswick City Council and served as mayor of Brunswick. He also served on the Brunswick Board of Education and was the vice-president of the school board. Benecke was involved in the Republican Party in Chariton County, Missouri. Benecke served in the Missouri Senate from 1869 to 1875. He wrote: Historical Sketch The "Sixties" in Chariton County, Missouri. In 1919. Benecke died in Brunswick, Missouri, after a long illness. His brother was Robert Benecke, who was a photographer.
