= Shotgun slug =

Type of ammunition used mainly in hunting medium and large game

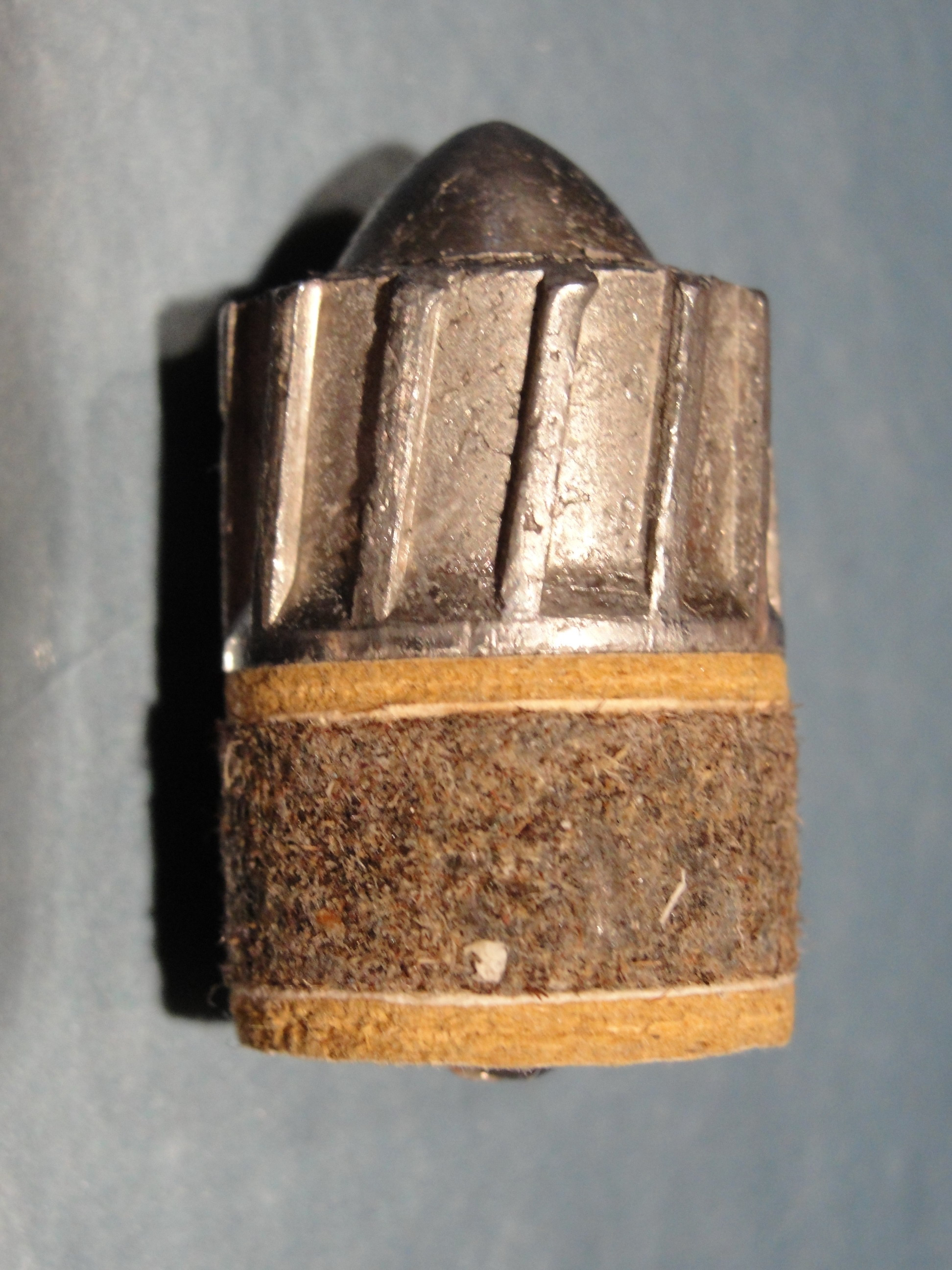
A Brenneke-style shotgun slug

A shotgun slug is a heavy projectile (a slug) made of lead, copper, or other material and fired from a shotgun. Slugs are designed for hunting large game, and other uses, particularly in areas near human population where their short range and rapid deceleration helps increase safety margin.

The first effective modern shotgun slug was introduced by Wilhelm Brenneke in 1898, and his design remains in use today. Most shotgun slugs are designed to be fired through a cylinder bore, improved cylinder choke, rifled choke tubes, or fully rifled bores. Slugs differ from round ball lead projectiles in that they are stabilized in some manner.

In the early development of firearms for the year 1875, smooth-bored barrels were not differentiated to fire either single or multiple projectiles. Single projectiles were used for larger game and warfare, though shot could be loaded as needed for small game, birds, and activities such as trench clearing and hunting. As firearms became specialized and differentiated, shotguns were still able to fire round balls, though rifled muskets were far more accurate and effective.

Modern slugs emerged as a way of improving on the accuracy of round balls. Early slugs were heavier in front than in the rear, similar to a Minié ball, to provide aerodynamic stabilization. Rifled barrels, rifled slugs, and rifled choke tubes were developed later to provide gyroscopic spin stabilization in place of or in addition to aerodynamic stabilization. Some of these slugs are saboted sub-caliber projectiles, resulting in greatly improved external ballistics performance.

A shotgun slug typically has more physical mass than a rifle bullet. For example, the lightest common .30-06 Springfield rifle bullet weighs 150 gr (9.7 g; 0.34 oz), while the lightest common 12 gauge shotgun slug weighs 383 gr (24.8 g; 0.88 oz). Slugs made of low-density material, such as rubber, are available as less than lethal specialty ammunition.

== Uses ==
Shotgun slugs are used to hunt medium to large game at short ranges by firing a single large projectile rather than a large number of smaller ones. In many populated areas, hunters are restricted to shotguns even for medium to large game, such as deer and elk, due to concerns about the range of modern rifle bullets. In such cases a slug will provide a longer range than a load of buckshot, which traditionally was used at ranges up to approximately 25 yd (23 m), without approaching the range of a rifle. In Alaska, seasoned professional guides and wild life officials use pump-action 12 gauge shotguns loaded with slugs for defense against both black and brown bears under 50 yd (46 m).

Law enforcement officers are frequently equipped with shotguns. In contrast to traditional buckshot, slugs offer benefits of accuracy, range, and increased wounding potential at longer ranges while avoiding stray pellets that could injure bystanders or damage property. Further, a shotgun allows selecting a desired shell to meet the need in a variety of situations. Examples include a less-lethal cartridge in the form of a bean bag round or other less lethal buckshot and slugs. A traditional rifle would offer greater range and accuracy than slugs, but without the variety of ammunition choices and versatility.

=== Design considerations ===
The mass of a shotgun slug is kept within SAAMI pressure limits for shot loads in any given shotgun shell load design. Slugs are designed to pass safely through open chokes and should never be fired through tight or unknown barrels. The internal pressure of the shotshell load will actually be slightly higher than the equivalent mass slug projectile load, due to an increased resistance that occurs from a phenomenon known as shot setback. Common 12 gauge slug masses are 7/8 oz (383 gr (24.8 g), 1 oz (437.5 gr (28.35 g), and 1 1/8 oz (492 gr (31.9 g), the same weight as common birdshot payloads.

=== Comparisons with rifle bullets ===
A 1 oz (437.5 gr (28.35 g) 2.75 in (70 mm) Foster 12 gauge shotgun slug achieves a velocity of approximately 1,560 ft/s (480 m/s) with a muzzle energy of 2,363 ft⋅lbf (3,204 J). 3 in (76 mm) slugs travel at around 1,760 ft/s (540 m/s) with a muzzle energy of 3,105 ft⋅lbf (4,210 J). In contrast, a .30-06 Springfield bullet weighing 150 gr (9.7 g) at a velocity of 2,600 ft/s (790 m/s) achieves an energy of 2,250 ft⋅lbf (3,050 J). A 180 gr (12 g) bullet at 2,775 ft/s (846 m/s), which is a very common 30-06 Springfield load and not its true maximum potential, achieves 3,079 ft⋅lbf (4,175 J) of energy. Due to the slug's larger caliber and shape, it has greater air resistance and slows down much more quickly than a bullet. It slows to less than half its muzzle energy at 100 yd (91 m), which is below the minimum recommended energy threshold for taking large game. The minimum recommended muzzle energy is (1,000 ft⋅lbf (1,400 J) for deer, 1,500 ft⋅lbf (2,000 J) for elk, and 2,000 ft⋅lbf (2,700 J) for moose). A slug also becomes increasingly inaccurate with distance; out to 300–1,000 yd (270–910 m) or more, with a maximum practical range of approximately 200 yd (180 m). In contrast, centerfire cartridges fired from rifles can easily travel at longer ranges of 1,000 yd (910 m) or more. Shotgun slugs are best suited for use over shorter ranges.

=== Taylor knock-out factor ===
The Taylor knock-out factor (TKOF) was developed as a measure of stopping power for hunting game, however it is a rather flawed calculation. It is defined as the product of bullet mass, velocity and diameter, using the imperial units grains (equal to 64.79891 mg), feet per second (equal to 0.3048 m/s) and inches (equal to 25.4 mm):

$$\text{TKOF} = \text{Mass(grains)} \times \text{Velocity(feet per second)} \times \text{Diameter(inches)} \times \frac{1}{7000}.$$

Some TKOF example values for shotgun slugs are:

- 71 TKOF for a 70 mm (2.75 in) slug (i.e. 437.5 grain (1 oz) × 1,560 FPS × 0.729 caliber /7000 = 71.07 TKOF)
- 80 TKOF for a 76 mm (3 in) slug (i.e. 437.5 grain (1 oz) × 1,760 FPS × 0.729 caliber /7000 = 80.19 TKOF)

To compare with rifles, some TKOF example values for rifle cartridges are:

Stopping power	Cartridge	Bullet mass		Muzzle velocity		Muzzle energy	
Stopping power	Cartridge	grams	grains	m/s	fps	joules	ft-lbs
19.6 TKOF	7mm Remington Magnum	10.9	168	878	2,880	4,201	3,098
21.8 TKOF	.30-06 Springfield	11.7	181	838	2,750	4,108	3,030
25.7 TKOF	.300 Remington Ultra Magnum	11.7	180	988	3,240	5,710	4,210
35.2 TKOF	.45-70 Government	26.2	404	405	1,330	2,149	1,585
40.7 TKOF	.375H&H	19.4	300	760	2,500	5,644	4,163
47.0 TKOF	.378 Weatherby Magnum	19.4	299	892	2,930	7,718	5,693
57.1 TKOF	.416 Rigby	26	400	720	2,400	6,739	4,970
70.0 TKOF	.458 Winchester Magnum	32.4	500	652	2,140	6,887	5,080
140.7 TKOF	12.7×99mm NATO (.50 BMG)	42.0	648	928	3,040	18,050	13,310
159.4 TKOF	.600 Nitro Express	58.3	900	610	2,000	10,847	8,000

== Types ==
=== Full-bore slugs ===
Full-bore slugs such as the Brenneke and Foster designs use a spin-stabilization method of stabilization through the use of angled fins on the slug’s outer walls. The slight 750 RPM spin is enough to stabilize the slug because the slug’s center of pressure is so much further back than its center of mass. Saboted slugs are similar in shape to handgun bullets and airguns pellets. Their center of pressure is in front of their center of mass, meaning a higher twist rate is required to achieve proper stabilization. Most saboted slugs are designed for rifled shotgun barrels and are stabilized through gyroscopic forces from their spin.

==== Brenneke slugs ====
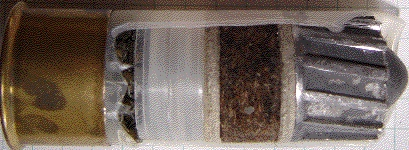
A 12 gauge Brenneke slug

The Brenneke slug was developed by the German gun and ammunition designer Wilhelm Brenneke (1865–1951) in 1898. The original Brenneke slug is a solid lead slug with ribs cast onto the outside, much like a rifled Foster slug. There is a plastic, felt or cellulose fiber wad attached to the base that remains attached after firing. This wad serves as a gas seal, preventing the gasses from going around the projectile. The lead "ribs" that are used for inducing spin also swage through any choked bore from improved cylinder to full. The soft metal, typically lead, fins squish or swage down in size to fit through the choke to allow for an easy passage.

==== Foster slugs ====
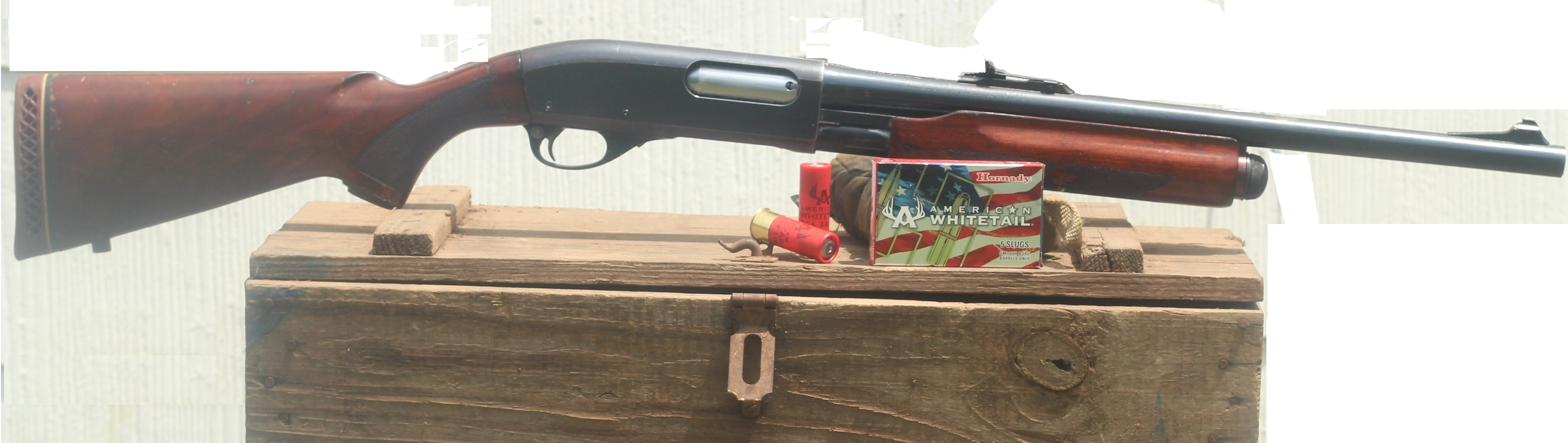
A Remington 870 12 gauge with sighted cylinder bore barrel suitable for Foster slugs and buckshot

The "Foster slug", invented by Karl M. Foster in 1931, and patented in 1947 (U.S. patent 2,414,863), is a type of shotgun slug designed to be fired through a smoothbore shotgun barrel, even though it commonly labeled as a "rifled" slug. A rifled slug is for smooth bores and a sabot slug is for rifled barrels.

Most Foster slugs also have "rifling", which consists of ribs on the outside of the slug. Like the Brenneke, these ribs impart a rotation on the slug to correct for manufacturing irregularities, thus improving precision (i.e. group size). Similar to traditional rifling, the rotation of the slug imparts gyroscopic stabilization.

=== Saboted slugs ===
Saboted slugs are shotgun projectiles smaller than the bore of the shotgun and supported by a plastic sabot. The sabot is traditionally designed to engage the rifling in a rifled shotgun barrel and impart a ballistic spin onto the projectile. This differentiates them from traditional slugs, which are not designed to benefit from a rifled barrel (though neither does the other any damage). Due to the fact that they do not contact the bore, they can be made from a variety of materials including lead, copper, brass, or steel. Saboted slugs can vary in shape, but are typically bullet-shaped for increased ballistic coefficient and greater range. The sabot is generally plastic and serves to seal the bore and keep the slug centered in the barrel while it rotates with the rifling. The sabot separates from the slug after it departs the muzzle. Saboted slugs fired from rifled bores are superior in accuracy over any smooth-bored slug options with accuracy approaching that of low-velocity rifle calibers.

=== Wad slugs ===
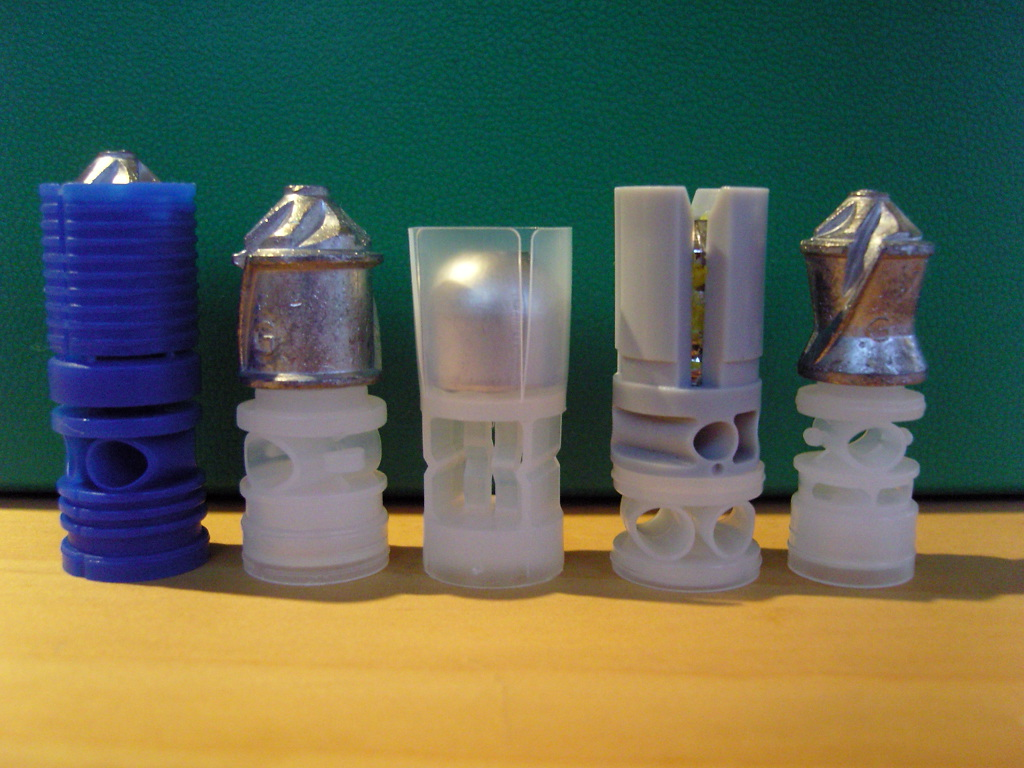
From the left, plumbata discarding sabot (No. 1); plumbata slugs (No. 2, No. 5); wad slug (No. 3), sabot slugs (No. 3, No. 4)

A modern variant between the Foster slug and the sabot slug is the wad slug. This is a type of shotgun slug designed to be fired through a smoothbore shotgun barrel. Like the traditional Foster slug, a deep hollow is located in the rear of this slug, which serves to retain the center of mass near the front tip of the slug much like the Foster slug. However, unlike the Foster slug, a wad slug additionally has a key or web wall molded across the deep hollow, spanning the hollow, which serves to increase the structural integrity of the slug while also reducing the amount of expansion of the slug when fired, reducing the stress on the shot wad in which it rides down a barrel. Also, unlike Foster slugs that have thin fins on the outside of the slug, much like those on the Brenneke, the wad slug is shaped with an ogive or bullet shape, with a smooth outer surface. The wad slug is loaded using a standard shotshell wad, which acts like a sabot. The diameter of the wad slug is slightly less than the nominal bore diameter, being around 0.690 in (17.5 mm) for a 12-gauge wad slug, and a wad slug is generally cast solely from pure lead, necessary for increasing safety if the slug is ever fired through a choked shotgun. Common 12 gauge slug masses are 7/8 oz ((383 gr (24.8 g)), 1 oz ((437.5 gr (28.35 g)), and 1 1/8 oz ((492 gr (31.9 g)), the same as common birdshot payloads. Depending on the specific stack-up, a card wad is also sometimes located between the slug and the shotshell wad, depending largely on which hull is specified, with the primary intended purpose of improving fold crimps on the loaded wad slug shell that serves to regulate fired shotshell pressures and improve accuracy.

It is also possible to fire a wad slug through rifled slug barrels, and, unlike with the Foster slug where lead fouling is often a problem, a wad slug typically causes no significant leading, being nested inside a traditional shotshell wad functioning as a sabot as it travels down the shotgun barrel.

Accuracy of wad slugs falls off quickly at ranges beyond 75 yd (69 m), thereby largely equaling the ranges possible with Foster slugs, while still not reaching the ranges possible with traditional sabot slugs using thicker-walled sabots.

Unlike the Foster slug which is traditionally roll-crimped, the wad slug is fold-crimped. Because of this important difference, and because it uses standard shotshell wads, a wad slug can easily be reloaded using any standard modern shotshell reloading press without requiring specialized roll-crimp tools.

=== Plumbata slugs ===
A plumbata slug has a plastic stabilizer attached to the projectile. The stabilizer may be fitted into a cavity in the bottom of the slug, or it may fit over the slug and into external notches on the slug. With the first method discarding sabots may be added. And with the second, the stabilizer may act as a sabot, but remains attached to the projectile and is commonly known as an "Impact Discarding Sabot" (IDS).

=== Steel slugs ===
There are some types of all-steel subcaliber slugs supported by a protective plastic sabot (the projectile would damage the barrel without a sabot). Examples include Russian "Tandem" wadcutter-type slug (the name is historical, as early versions consisted of two spherical steel balls) and ogive "UDAR" ("Strike") slug and French spool-like "Balle Blondeau" (Blondeau slug) and "Balle fleche Sauvestre" (Sauvestre flechette) with steel sabot inside expanding copper body and plastic rear empennage. Made of non-deforming steel, these slugs are well-suited to shooting in brush, but may produce overpenetration. They also may be used for disabling vehicles by firing in the engine compartment or for defeating hard body armor.

=== Improvised slugs ===
==== Wax slugs ====
Another variant of a Great Depression–era shotgun slug design is the wax slug. These were made by hand by cutting the end off a standard birdshot loaded shotshell, shortening the shell very slightly, pouring the lead shot out, and melting paraffin, candle wax, or crayons in a pan on a stovetop, mixing the lead birdshot in the melted wax, and then using a spoon to pour the liquified wax containing part of the birdshot back into the shotshell, all while not overfilling the shotgun shell. Once the shell cooled, the birdshot was now held in a mass by the cooled paraffin, and formed a slug. No roll or fold crimp was required to hold the wax slug in the hull. These were often used to hunt deer during the Depression.

==== Cut shell slugs ====
Yet another expedient shotgun slug design is the cut shell. These are made by hand from a standard birdshot shell by cutting a ring around and through the hull of the shell that nearly encircles the shell, with the cut traditionally located in the middle of the wad separating the powder and shot. A small amount of the shell wall is retained, amounting to roughly a quarter of the circumference of the shotshell hull. When fired, the end of the hull separates from the base and travels through the bore and down range. Cut shells have the advantage of expedience. They can be handmade on the spot as the need arises while on a hunt for small game if a larger game animal such as a deer or a bear appears. In terms of safety, part of the shell may remain behind in the barrel, causing potential problems if not noticed and cleared before another shot is fired.

== Guns for use with slugs ==
Many hunters hunt with shotgun slugs where rifle usage is not allowed, or as a way of saving the cost of a rifle by getting additional use out of their shotgun. A barrel for shooting slugs can require some special considerations. The biggest drawback of a rifled shotgun barrel is the inability to fire buckshot or birdshot accurately. While buckshot or birdshot will not rapidly damage the gun (it can wear the rifling of the barrel with long-term repeated use), the shot's spread increases nearly four-fold compared to a smooth bore, and pellets tend to form a ring-shaped pattern due to the pellets' tangential velocity moving them away from the bore line. In practical terms, the effective range of a rifled shotgun loaded with buckshot is limited to 10 yd (9.1 m) or less.

Iron sights or a low magnification telescopic sight are needed for accuracy, rather than the bead sight used with shot, and an open choke is best. Since most current production shotguns come equipped with sighting ribs and interchangeable choke tubes, converting a standard shotgun to a slug gun can be as simple as attaching clamp-on sights to the rib and switching to a skeet or cylinder choke tube. There are also rifled choke tubes of cylinder bore.

Many repeating shotguns have barrels that can easily be removed and replaced in under a minute with no tools, so many hunters simply use an additional barrel for shooting slugs. Slug barrels will generally be somewhat shorter, have rifle type sights or a base for a telescopic sight, and may be either rifled or smooth bore. Smooth-bore shotgun barrels are quite a bit less expensive than rifled shotgun barrels, and Foster type slugs, as well as wad slugs, can work well up to 75 yd (69 m) in a smooth-bore barrel. For achieving accuracy at 100 yd (91 m) and beyond, however, a dedicated rifled slug barrel usually provides significant advantages.

Another option is to use a rifled choke in a smooth-bore barrel, at least for shotguns having a removable choke tube. Rifled chokes are considerably less expensive than a rifled shotgun barrel, and a smooth-bore barrel paired with a rifled choke is often nearly as accurate as a rifled shotgun barrel dedicated for use with slugs. There are many options in selecting shotguns for use with slugs.

Improvements in slug performance have also led to some very specialized slug guns. The H&R Ultra Slug Hunter, for example, uses a heavy rifled barrel (see Accurize) to obtain high accuracy from slugs.

== Reloading shotgun slugs ==
Shotgun slugs are often hand loaded, primarily to save cost but also to improve performance over that possible with commercially manufactured slug shells. In contrast, it is possible to reload slug shells with hand-cast lead slugs for less than $0.50 (c. 2013) each. The recurring cost depends heavily on which published recipe is used. Some published recipes for handloading 1 oz (437.5 gr (28.35 g) 12 gauge slugs require as much as 49 gr (3.2 g) of powder each, whereas other 12 gauge recipes for 7/8 oz (383 gr (24.8 g) slugs require only 25 gr (1.6 g) of powder.

Shotguns operate at much lower pressures than pistols and rifles, typically operating at pressures of 14,000 psi (97 MPa) or less, for 12 gauge shells, whereas rifles and pistols routinely are operated at pressures in excess of 40,000 psi (280 MPa), and sometimes upwards of 60,000 psi (410 MPa). The SAAMI maximum permitted pressure limit is only 11,500 psi (79 MPa) for 12 gauge 2.75 in (70 mm) and 3 in (76 mm) shells, including shotgun slugs, so the typical operating pressures for many shotgun shells are only slightly below the maximum permitted pressures allowed for the use of safe ammunition. This small safety margin, and the possibility of pressure varying by over 4,000 psi (28 MPa) with small changes in components, require great care and consistency in hand-loading.

== Legal issues ==
Shotgun slugs are sometimes subject to specific regulation. Legislation differs with each country.

=== The Netherlands ===
Large game (including deer and wild boar) hunting is only allowed with large caliber rifles; shotguns are only allowed for small and medium-sized game, up to foxes and geese. However, when a shotgun has a rifled barrel, it is considered a rifle, and it becomes legal for hunting roe deer with a minimum caliber 5.56 mm (0.219 in) and 980 J (720 ft⋅lbf) at a 100 m (110 yd) and deer or wild boar with a minimum caliber 6.5 mm (0.26 in) and 2,200 J (1,600 ft⋅lbf) at 100 m (110 yd).

=== Sweden ===
Slugs fired from a single-barrel shotgun are allowed for hunting wild boar, fallow deer, and mouflon, although when hunting for wounded game there are no restrictions. The shot must be fired at a range of no more than 40 m (44 yd). The hunter must also have the legal right to use a rifle for such game in order to hunt with shotgun slugs.

=== United Kingdom ===
Ammunition which contains no fewer than five projectiles, none of which exceed 0.36 in (9.1 mm) in diameter, is legal with a Section 2 Shotgun Certificate. Slugs, which contain only one projectile and usually exceed 0.36 in (9.1 mm) in diameter, are controlled under the Firearms Act, and require a firearms certificate to possess, which is very strictly regulated. Legal uses in the UK include, but are not restricted to, practical shotgun enthusiasts as members of clubs and at competitions, such as those run by or affiliated to the UKPSA.

=== United States ===
Rifled barrels for shotguns are an unusual legal issue in the United States. Firearms with rifled barrels are designed to fire single projectiles, and a firearm that is designed to fire a single projectile with a diameter greater than .50 inches (12.7 mm) is considered a destructive device and as such is severely restricted. However, the ATF has ruled that as long as the gun was designed to fire shot, and modified (by the user or the manufacturer) to fire single projectiles with the addition of a rifled barrel, then the firearm is still considered a shotgun and not a destructive device.

In some areas, rifles are prohibited for hunting animals such as deer. This is generally due to safety concerns. Shotgun slugs have a far shorter maximum range than most rifle cartridges, and are safer for use near populated areas. In some areas, there are designated zones and special shotgun-only seasons for deer. This may include a modern slug shotgun, with rifled barrel and high performance sabot slugs, which provides rifle-like power and accuracy at ranges over 150 yards (140 m).
