= Edward King (author) =

Edward King (1848–1896) was an American author and journalist born in Middlefield, Massachusetts. His 1875 travel memoir The Great South is an important historical document about U.S. society in the aftermath of the U.S. Civil War, and it formed part of the backlash against Black civil rights during Reconstruction. Each section of The Great South was originally published in an issue of Scribner's Magazine.

For a time he was a correspondent in Paris on behalf of American periodicals. During the Russo-Turkish War he was a correspondent in the Balkans with the Russian army.

King's journal The Great South; A Record of Journeys, published in 1875, is an important source about attitudes in the post-Civil War United States. Its narrative writing style is engaging and was persuasive to many readers of his era. King's deeply racist characterizations of Southern society were influential in creating a view of Reconstruction as an economic failure and a political travesty. In a typical chapter on The Spoilation of South Carolina King writes that African Americans are "insolent and aggressive," whereas "The white people of the State are powerless to resist; they are trampled completely down." (Chapter LI) King's negative characterizations of Black Americans and of Reconstruction helped create stereotypes that proved long-lasting.

== Publications ==
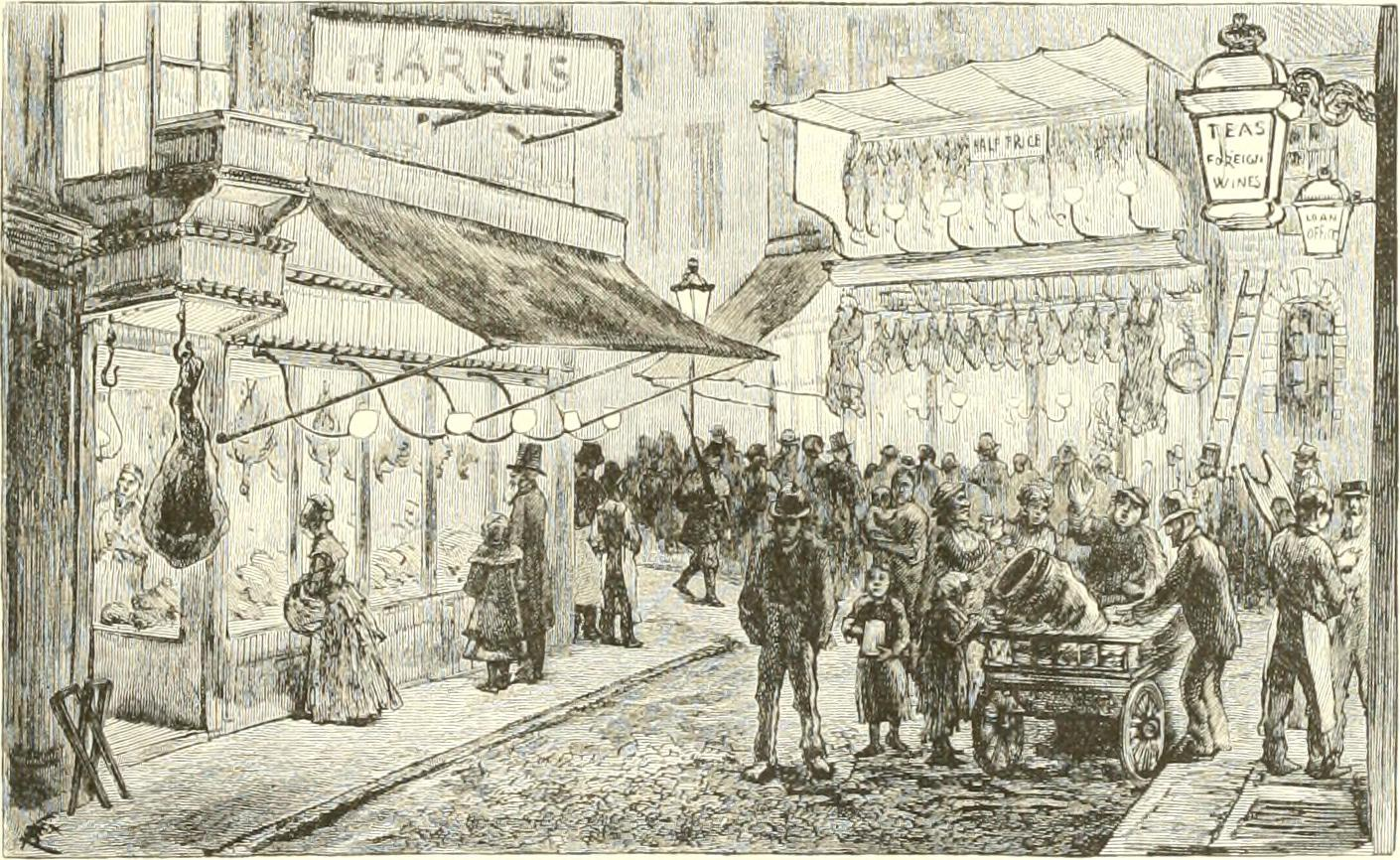
Europe in Storm and Calm (1885)

- My Paris: French Character Sketches (1868)
- Kentucky's Love; or, Roughing it Around Paris (1873)
- The Great South: A Record of Journeys in Louisiana, Texas, the Indian Territory, Missouri, Arkansas, Mississippi, Alabama, Georgia, Florida, South Carolina, North Carolina, Kentucky, Tennessee, Virginia, West Virginia, and Maryland (1875)
- French Political Leaders (1876)
- Echoes from the Orient: with miscellaneous poems (1880)
- The Gentle Savage; a novel (1883)
- Europe in Storm and Calm: Twenty Years' Experiences and Reminiscences of an American Journalist (1885)
- The Golden Spike; a fantasy in prose (1886)
- A Venetian Lover (1887)
- Texas: 1874 (?)
- Joseph Zalmonah : a novel (1894)
- Under the red flag; or, The adventures of two American boys in the days of the commune (1895)
