= Double tap (shooting technique) =

Shooting technique of two consecutive shots

A double tap is a shooting technique where two shots are fired in rapid succession at the same target with the same sight picture (as opposed to the controlled pair, whereby a second sighting is acquired for the second shot). Instruction and practice of the double-tap improves accuracy as shooters often do not have the firearm fully extended on the first shot, meaning the second shot of a double tap is usually more accurate. The term hammer is sometimes used to describe a double tap in which the firearm's sights are not reacquired by the shooter between shots.

== History ==
The origin of the double-tap technique is credited to William Ewart Fairbairn and Eric A. Sykes, British police chiefs working in Shanghai during the 1930s who developed the technique in order to overcome the limitations of full-metal-jacketed (FMJ) ammunition. FMJ ammunition is commonly used by militaries for feeding reliability, adherence to the Hague Conventions regarding non-expanding ammunition, and improved penetration. FMJ rounds can sometimes fail to cause sufficient damage (at least when compared to expanding bullets), requiring more hits and better shot placement. In Ian Dear's book Sabotage and Subversion about British Special Operations Executive (SOE) and United States Office of Strategic Services (OSS) forces, Fairbairn is reported to have instructed SOE personnel in the double tap from 1944 to 1945 at the SOE training school directed by Fairbairn and Sykes near Arisaig in Scotland. The term double tap is now used to describe the more general technique of firing two rounds quickly and accurately to disable an opponent. The tactic is still used by firearms handlers, police tactical teams, military personnel, counter-terrorist combat units, and other special operations forces personnel.

The Russian assault rifle AN-94 can automatically shoot two bullets in a rapid burst; this feature was intended to improve the single shot hit probability of the rifle.

Double taps are an integral part of the El Presidente combat pistol shooting drill developed by Jeff Cooper during the 1970s and published in the January/February 1979 issue of American Handgunner. Also developed by Cooper during the 1970s is the Mozambique drill or failure drill, for a situation whereby a double-tap to the torso fails to stop an attacker, adding a third shot to the head.

== Technique ==
In the double-tap technique, after the first round is fired, the shooter quickly reacquires the sights for a fast second shot. This skill can be practiced by firing two shots at a time, taking time between the shots to reacquire the sights. With practice, the time between shots becomes briefer and briefer until it seems to an observer as if the shooter is just pulling the trigger twice very quickly.

According to a U.S. Army training manual, "There is a natural arc of the front sight post after the round is fired and the recoil kicks in. The soldier lets the barrel go with this arc and immediately brings the front sight post back on target and takes a second shot. The soldier does not fight the recoil. In combat, soldiers shoot until the enemy goes down. For multiple targets, each target should receive a double tap. After all targets are engaged, soldiers engage the targets again as needed."

== See also ==
- AN-94/AO-63
- Modern technique
- Point shooting
- Stopping power
