= Hop-up =

Hop-Up may refer to:

- Hop-up (airsoft), the backspin put on airsoft pellets to increase their range via the Magnus effect
- aftermarket gears for Tamiya TT-01 remote control chassis
