= Combat pistol shooting =

Modern martial art

Combat pistol shooting is a modern martial art that focuses on the use of the handgun as a defensive weapon for self defense, or for military and police use. Like most martial arts, combat pistol shooting is practiced both for defense and for sport.

Many of the action shooting disciplines are based on combat pistol techniques, and take the form of simulations of defensive or combat situations.

== History ==
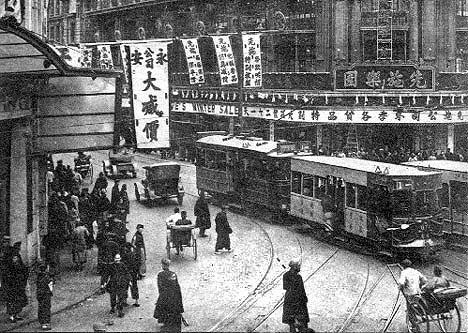
British section of the International Settlement in Shanghai, during the 1920s.

Combat pistol shooting, as separate from target shooting, began to evolve in the early 1900s. Modern tactics of pistol combat were developed in the 1920s by two British members of the Shanghai Municipal Police. (Shanghai was then governed by an international government). At the time the Shanghai streets were rife with criminal activity, and policing in the city was becoming a very dangerous line of work.

Captain William E. Fairbairn and Sergeant Eric A. Sykes developed innovative pistol shooting techniques and handgun specifications for the police force. During the Second World War, they were recalled to Britain, and trained the British Commandos in their combat tactics, including their system of combat pistol shooting. Their methodology was later disseminated through their book Shooting To Live With The One-Hand Gun, published in 1942. These techniques were also adopted for the training of American Office of Strategic Services troops by Rex Applegate. This system lives on today in modern point shooting techniques.

In the 1950s, American instructor Jeff Cooper was instrumental in establishing both a combat pistol based sport, International Practical Shooting Confederation, and a combat pistol training school, Gunsite. Cooper's methodology has become known as the modern technique. The methods promoted by Fairbairn and Cooper differ in many respects, and to this day there are arguments between supporters of the different methodologies.

== Combat pistol drills ==
=== El Presidente ===
One combat pistol drill is the El Presidente drill, developed by Jeff Cooper in the 1970s and published in the January/February 1979 issue of American Handgunner magazine. This is used as a benchmark to gauge a shooter's skills, as it tests the draw and reload, and requires good transitions and follow-through. The El Presidente drill is set up as follows:

- Three silhouette targets are placed 1 meter apart in a line 10 meters from the shooter.
- The shooter starts with six rounds in a holstered handgun, and a spare magazine or speedloader with another six rounds.
- The shooter begins facing directly away from the targets, often with hands clasped in front or over the head.
- Upon the starting signal, the shooter turns and draws, fires two shots at each target, reloads, and then fires two more shots at each target.

Scoring varies; the simplest method uses hit/miss scoring, with a time penalty (often 10 seconds) for each miss. El Presidente drills scored under the IPSC Comstock system take the total number of points on the targets (possible 60 points) and divide that by the time taken to complete the drill. This generates a number called "hit factor," which is a numerical representation of how many points the shooter placed on target per second during the drill; e.g., shooting 55 points in 5.5 seconds would give the shooter a 10.0 hit factor. Originally, a time of 10 seconds with a stock handgun, and all the points on target, was considered good. Today, shooters using modern IPSC raceguns with muzzle brakes and red dot sights are close to breaking the three-second barrier, and even shooters using production guns with no muzzle brakes or optical sights routinely break the five-second mark.

=== The Dozier Drill ===
This drill was invented by Jeff Cooper after the kidnapping of Brigadier General James L. Dozier by Italian Red Brigade members. The militants had entered General Dozier's apartment by posing as plumbers. As many as eight completed the gang and four or perhaps five entered the apartment. One of the militants removed a submachine gun from his bag of tools while another read a political statement to General Dozier. At that time, US military personnel were prohibited by Italian law from carrying firearms within their areas of accommodation, which were within the local community and not on US bases. General Dozier was unarmed and unable to defend himself. In response to this incident, Jeff Cooper designed the "Dozier drill".

The range is set with five metal silhouette targets which are hinged at their base (called "Pepper Poppers") so as to fall backwards when struck. A second participant stands well to one side and is tasked with retrieving a pistol and a magazine from a toolbag, which he must assemble and ready for action. This action mimics the terrorist who retrieved his submachine gun from his toolbag and provides a datum against which the shooter must compare his performance. On the signal, the shooter must draw his pistol and engage the five targets, representing the five terrorists, before the participant representing the terrorist retrieves his weapon and readies it for use.

=== Malfunction clearing drills ===
When engaged in combat shooting, sometimes cartridges do not feed into the chamber properly. These malfunctions must be corrected quickly so that firing can be resumed. There are variations of malfunction drills, including the two most often required in competition: clearing a cartridge that fails to fire, and clearing a double feed malfunction.

1. User error: Magazine improperly seated, ammunition is not loaded upon racking of the slide.
2. Stovepipe: Spent round does not fully eject and is often seen standing upright in the ejection port appearing like a stovepipe.
3. Double feed: Spent or unspent round remains in chamber while another round also tries to load into same space.

=== Instinct drills ===
Up until the mid-1980s, standard police trainers taught sight-picture shooting at all but contact distances. With the dissemination of the concept of instinct shooting with a handgun, described and explained in Chuck Klein's 1986 book, Instinct Combat Shooting, Defensive Handgunning for Police, the method began to be accepted by the police trainers. Though William E. Fairbairn, Sergeant Eric A. Sykes and Jeff Cooper touted the advantages of sightless shooting at close quarter distances, they did not explain how it was achieved, which was Chuck Klein's contribution.

Instinct shooting requires the same eye, hand, and mind events as throwing a baseball or darts. The shooter must devote full attention on the smallest part of the target whilst drawing the weapon to fire. Once the weapon is at the ready, the shooter must fire immediately, to avoid losing the intense focus and missing the target. This technique is most often practiced with a moving target, such as clay birds. The practical use of this drill is for life or death situations, in which the gun handler must instinctively and accurately shoot the target, or die himself. The shooter must almost simultaneously:

- See the target
- Decide to shoot
- Start moving the gun to position
- Focus on a small part of the target
- Pull the trigger the instant the weapon reaches position

== See also ==
- Gun fu
- Pistol-whipping
- Buttstroke
