= Airsoft pellets =

Projectiles used by airsoft guns

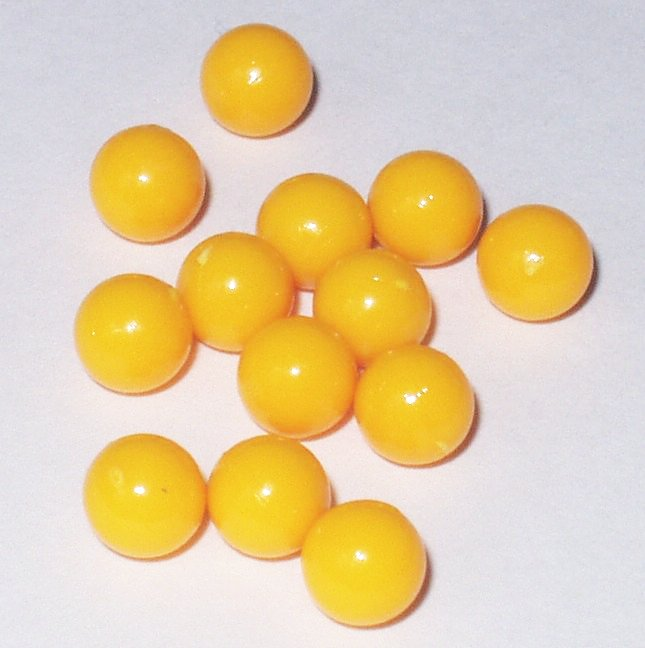
Low-quality 6 mm 0.12 g plastic airsoft pellets

Airsoft pellets (known as BBs) are spherical projectiles used by airsoft guns. Typically made of plastic, they usually measure around 6 mm (0.24 in) in diameter (though selective models use 8 mm (0.315 in), or 6.4 mm (0.252 in)), and weigh 0.20–0.40 g (3.1–6.2 gr), with the most common weights being 0.20 g (3.1 gr) and 0.25 g (3.9 gr), while 0.28 g (4.3 gr), 0.30 g (4.6 gr), 0.32 g (4.9 gr), and 0.40 g (6.2 gr) BBs are also commonplace. Though frequently referred to as "BBs" among airsoft users, these BBs are not the same as either of the 4.5 mm caliber metal projectiles that BB guns fire, or the 4.6 mm (0.180 in)-sized birdshot from which the term "BB" originated.

== Variants ==
Although the majority of pellets bought and used are simple spherical projectiles made of plastic, some of the following special varieties can be used to give a player an advantage, such as higher quality pellets.

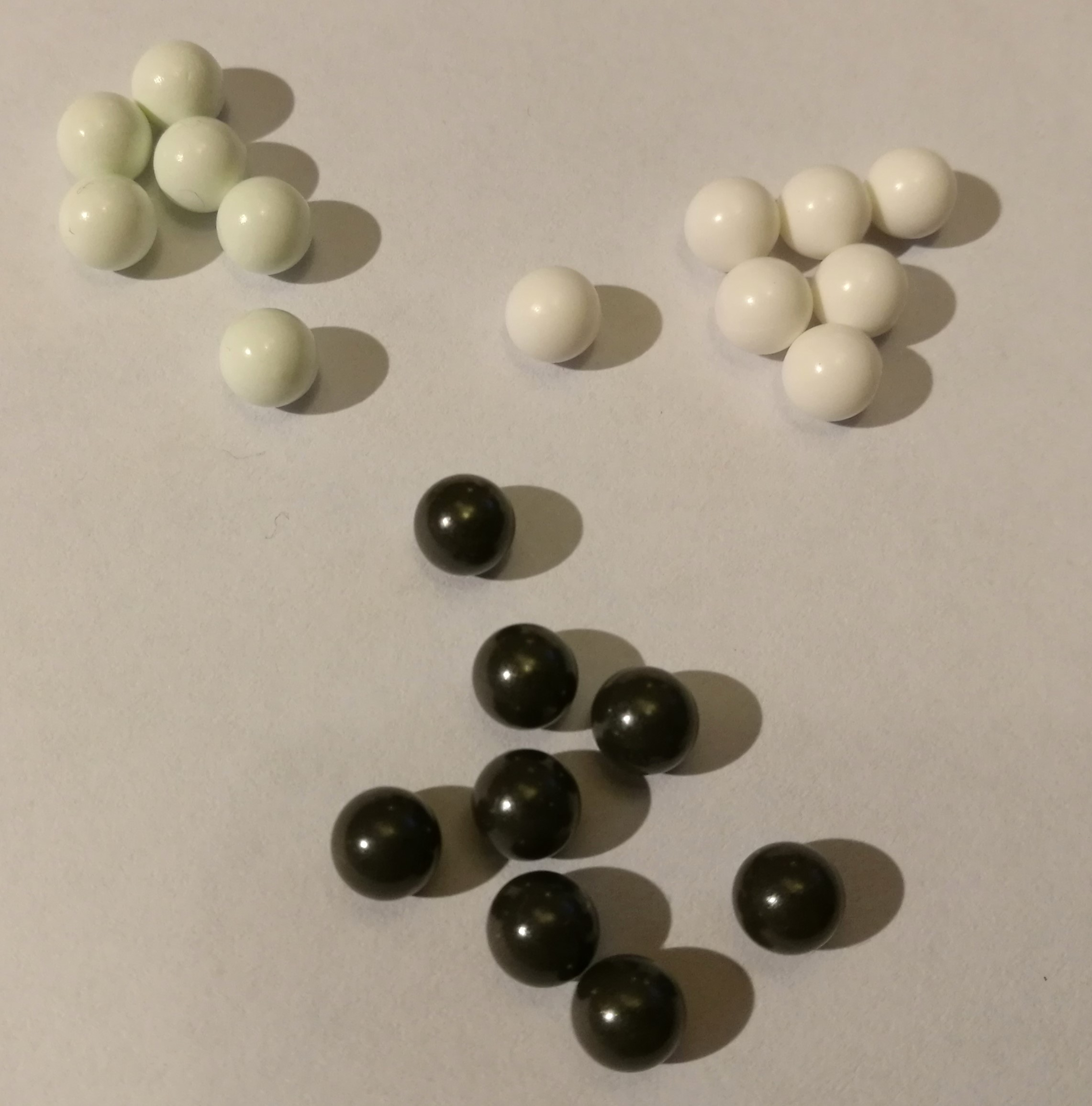
High quality Airsoft pellets.

=== Biodegradable ===
Biodegradable pellets are available, and are often required by outdoor fields where sweeping is not an option. Conventional pellets pollute the environment, as most non-biodegradable pellets have a mineral or petroleum-based center, coated in non-biodegradable plastics, thus ensuring they will stay in the environment for several hundred years if not collected. Biodegradable pellets are made of various types of resin, often developed for the agricultural industry, and better makes are certified as compostable. Commonly used plastic resins include polylactic acid or polylactide (PLA) which is based on renewable materials like corn products and a molecular formula of (C_{3}H_{4}O_{2})_{n}. There is a mixture of degradable processes being used, such as soil microbes and photosensitive degradation. Biodegradable pellets are currently being produced with all the characteristics of the best of the conventional, with homogeneous resin construction.

Most high-quality pellets are available in a non-biodegradable version, as well as a biodegradable version that costs slightly more. Both bio- and non-biodegradable pellets are popular and widely available.

=== Tracers ===
Glow-in-the-dark pellets, known as tracer pellets, can be used in conjunction with a device that "charges" the pellets by flashing them with a burst of light before leaving the barrel so that they remain luminescent in flight for use during nocturnal games/operations. This tracer unit is usually hidden from view, often disguised as a suppressor, or is included inside the magazine or hop-up unit. There are also biodegradable tracer pellets available.

=== Non-traceable pellets ===
This type of pellet is dark-colored so that the opponent has a tougher time spotting the pellets' origin, as the most common pellet color is white, which makes it easy for the opposition to spot the shooter by following the trail of pellets. Two major problems of this variant of pellet are that there are few high-quality pellets in this color and the shooter has a difficult time seeing their own trail of shots.

=== Paint-spherical projectiles ===
Paint-filled pellets are also available, called "paintballs", which are very similar to those used in paintball. Airsoft models equipped with the hop-up projectile stabilizing system are not able to use these, as the thin shells are liable to break in the barrel, covering the inside with paint. These special pellets are also incompatible with airsoft models using mechanized feeding systems, such as high capacity magazines, for the same reason. With some companies, the use of paintballs voids the airsoft gun's warranty; paint may get into the mechanical workings of the airsoft gun and damage parts beyond simple maintenance. These issues may be fixed by removing the hop-up unit, which can void the warranty, and also switching to a low or mid-capacity magazine with no mechanized feed.

=== Markers ===
A specialized pellet coated in a powder or liquid that leaves a small colored mark when it strikes a surface. The powder deposits from these pellets are left in any part of the airsoft gun or storage unit that the pellet comes in contact with; build-up over time, without cleaning, can cause malfunctions or damage to moving parts.

Made from (most commonly) 100% silica, the material in these pellets is very evenly distributed, improving flight characteristics. Some accounts indicate that these pellets are capable of breaking glass and industry-standard protective eyewears. Due to safety concerns and reports of injuries caused by this type of pellets, it is commonly prohibited in professional airsoft facilities.

=== Metallic ===
Metal pellets are also marketed for use in airsoft guns. These pellets are heavier and harder than conventional polymer pellets, and the impact from a metal pellet can injure players. Safety concerns make metallic pellets suitable only for target shooting. The added weight reduces the effect of crosswind on the pellet, imparting more accuracy when fired at longer ranges in outdoor environments where wind would significantly alter the trajectory of traditional pellets. Many airsoft locations where players can pay to play against others prohibit the use of metallic pellets due to the fact they are more likely to penetrate skin. Metallic pellets are mostly used in a standard pump-action or carbon dioxide-powered BB guns.

=== Ceramic ===
Created from laboratory-grown crystal lattice structures, these pellets are individually machined to precise specifications that ensure uniform weight, dimensions and surface shape. This precision and uniformity provides ideal ballistic performance and consistent flight patterns. The manufacturing process and materials are much more costly than molded polymer pellets – as a result, ceramic pellets are considerably more expensive than standard airsoft pellets. The material is able to defeat standard eye protection due to the weight and higher energy required to propel it, thus unsuitable for use against other human targets

=== Translucent ===
Translucent pellets come in many colors. They tend to be non-biodegradeable and it can be difficult to find high quality versions compared to their opaque counterparts.

== Pellet mass ==
Pellet mass is an important factor when choosing pellets. The pellet's mass influences several aspects of pellet performance:

- Velocity: Lighter pellets achieve higher velocities, but are more prone to influence from external factors like wind. Lighter pellets also decelerate (lose velocity) faster than heavier pellets. Due to the increased momentum of a heavier pellet, it will hit harder than a lighter one. In addition, while apparently counterintuitive, lighter pellets can actually decrease range due to the mechanics of hop-up. Velocity is usually specified in feet per second (FPS) or meters / second (MPS). FPS is more commonly used globally and the specified number is measured using a 0.2g BB. When using a heavier BB, FPS will go down since laws of physics dictate that energy remains constant.
- Energy: Lighter pellets have higher kinetic energy in lower-velocity guns, but heavier pellets show trends to have higher kinetic energy in guns that shoot 620 ft/s (190 m/s).
- Trajectory: The curvature of a projectile (trajectory) determines its range and lighter pellets typically result in much more curved or unpredictable trajectories, although using a hop-up can flatten, regulate and extend trajectory.
- Hardware: Heavier pellets may require a more powerful airsoft gun and often necessitates upgraded springs and other gun parts.

A player's choice of pellet mass is governed by their gaming style (assaulting vs. sniping), the airsoft gun used (internal parts), game venue condition (in/outdoor) and size, and muzzle velocity regulations.

Also, the quality of the individual pellets may influence choice of price-range or manufacturer. Low-cost pellets are often considered to have such negative characteristics as residual plastic from the moulding process (flash); lower impact resistance and some deviation from perfect spherical shape. Cheaper pellets are known to shatter when fired, which can cause irreparable damage to the internals of the gun. Higher cost BBs generally have a smoother finish, are more impact resistant and are perfectly spherical.

=== 6 mm airsoft pellets ===
6 mm is the industrial standard size used in almost all spring, electric and gas airsoft guns. A wide variety of pellet masses are also available for different usages.

- 0.11 g (1.7 gr) – Manufactured by HFC, same use as .12 gram. Extremely Uncommon.
- 0.12 g (1.9 gr) – Extremely common, standard weight for all low-grade AEG's and spring guns. Not to be used in any small arms beyond low-cost, low quality replicas firing under 250 ft/s (76 m/s). These pellets are notorious for breaking inside high-powered guns because they are not hollow inside. The low weight of this pellet also causes it to be extremely inaccurate because they are easily affected by the slightest of breezes.
- 0.135 g (2.08 gr) – Same uses as 0.12 g (1.9 gr). Extremely Uncommon. MFI standard. Not to be used in most guns.
- 0.15 g (2.3 gr) – Same uses as 0.12 g (1.9 gr). Uncommon. Made only by Air Venturi, Red Jacket, Elite Force, and Black Ops USA.
- 0.16 g (2.5 gr) – Essentially the same as the 0.15 g (2.3 gr) pellets. Made only by Air Venturi.
- 0.20 g (3.1 gr) – Second-most common weight. Standard for all chronograph tests in regions, where gun power output is measured in feet per second (FPS). AEGs are able to use these, however, most players will use heavier masses due to the increased accuracy and range.
- 0.21 g (3.2 gr) – Homemade by covering 0.20 g (3.1 gr) with pencil lead. Great for "paintball" but leaves residue in barrel.
- 0.22 g (3.4 gr) – Available from Pyramyd Air.
- 0.23 g (3.5 gr) – Heavier pellets for AEGs. Blends speed of 0.20 g (3.1 gr) with range and accuracy of 0.25 g (3.9 gr). Used less now in favor of 0.20 g (3.1 gr) & 0.25 g (3.9 gr)
- 0.24 g (3.7 gr) – Only known manufacturers are Airstrike (a subsidiary of Daisy) and Crosman
- 0.25 g (3.9 gr) – Third-most common weight, especially popular for the higher-powered AEGs used in America. This is the heaviest mass for lower-powered AEGs, blowback and spring guns. Tokyo Marui standard AEGs, gas and spring guns are set at the factory for 0.25 g (3.9 gr) pellets, and they usually include a package of 200 of these with the gun. These are available in bio- and non-biodegradable versions from many sellers including Valken, EliteForce, 6mmProShop and Matrix.
- 0.26 g (4.0 gr) – Made by TSD in biodegradable form.
- 0.27 g (4.2 gr) – Made by Bioval BBBMAX. They are (ostensibly) considered to be of the same grade, if not higher than the Maruzen SGM, while being significantly less expensive.
- 0.28 g (4.3 gr) – Most used weight in Northern Europe. Suitable for modern standard AEGs. Typically cheaper than 0.30 g (4.6 gr) but yields similar performance. Biodegradable versions are made by most manufacturers.
- 0.29 g (4.5 gr) – Maruzen Super Grandmaster pellets, designed for their Air Precision Shooting series of airsoft guns. O
- 0.30 g (4.6 gr) – Standard mass for most sniper rifles. Also recommended weight for tuned AEGs. Have become more common in recent times with some of the top brands like Bioval and Bioshot, Biodegradable versions made by various manufacturers including G&G and Tokyo Marui.
- 0.32 g (4.9 gr) – Also standard for sniper rifles. Offers excellent balance of velocity and stability for most spring and gas sniper rifles. These are available from Evike, Elite Force, and other BB manufacturers. A well-known brand is Goldenball.
- 0.36 g (5.6 gr) – Heavier pellets for sniper rifles. Slower, but have high stability. Produced by Madbull Airsoft, among others. BB Bastard manufactures a ceramic pellet in this mass class.
- 0.40 g (6.2 gr) – Heavy pellets for airsoft sniper rifles. Mad Bull is a known producer. Even slower than 0.36 g (5.6 gr) but even more stable and maintains its velocity better.
- 0.43 g (6.6 gr) – For the highest level of upgrades in spring and gas sniper rifles. Usually graphite-coated.
- 0.66 g (10.2 gr) – For extreme long-range shooting, not used against human targets. This is a CNC-machined ceramic pellet made by BB Bastard.
- 0.90 g (13.9 gr) – Nickel-plated steel BBs sold by UK's Abacus Claysports. Air gun grade, not used against human targets.

=== 8 mm airsoft pellets ===
8 mm (0.315 in) pellets are most commonly used in gas-powered airsoft shotguns with high velocities.

- 0.27 g (4.2 gr) – Low mass
- 0.34 g (5.2 gr) (Normal) — Standard mass
- 0.35 g (5.4 gr) (Biodegradable) — Standard mass
- 0.40 g (6.2 gr)
- 0.45 g (6.9 gr)
- 0.48 g (7.4 gr)
- 0.50 g (7.7 gr)
- 0.90 g (13.9 gr) – Heaviest mass

== Flight physics ==
=== Pellet muzzle velocity and energy ===
Velocity vs. energy chart for 6 mm Airsoft pellets.

The pellet speed of spring-powered and automatic electric guns is determined in large part by the tension of the gun's main spring. Muzzle velocity limits are between 90 and 120 m/s (300 and 390 ft/s) for AEGs and 120 to 170 m/s (390–560 ft/s) for single-shot spring sniper rifles.

For comparison purposes, 3.00 g (46 3/10 gr) is the typical mass of a paintball pellet, and 0.2 g (3 9/100 gr) is the standard for an airsoft pellet. At 3 g mass, a pellet flying at 100 m/s (330 ft/s) has 15 J of kinetic energy, while a 0.20 g has 1 J. It is important to distinguish that, in airsoft, the terminal impact energy is very close to the kinetic energy of the pellet because the collision is almost completely elastic. On the other hand, in paintball, the pellet fractures upon impact, leading to an inelastic collision with energy loss, and thus the impact energy is smaller than the kinetic energy of the pellet. Nevertheless, the typical impact energies of the airsoft pellet tend to be much smaller than of the paintball.

=== Pellet ballistics ===
impact energy dependence on distance of impact for a typical airsoft pellet

While a pellet's muzzle velocity is important for safety proposes, it will lose velocity during flight due to drag. The typical deceleration of a pellet of mass "m" and diameter "D" is given by the quadratic drag:

$$A_\text{drag} = \frac{1}{2m}\rho_\text{air} v^2 \cdot 0.47 \cdot \pi \left(\frac{D}{2}\right)^2$$

where v is the instantaneous velocity of the pellet. For typical values of the pellet (m = 0.2 g, v = 120 m/s, D = 6 mm), the drag can be very high ($576\ \mathrm{m}/\mathrm{s}^2$), which means that the velocity decreases quite fast.

The above equation has a simple solution for velocity vs. distance:

$$v = {v_0}{e^{ - s/{s_0}}}$$

where ${v_0}$ is the initial velocity, $s$ is the distance travelled, and ${s_0}$ is the distance over which the velocity is reduced to $1/e$ of ${v_0}$:

$${{s}_{0}}=\frac{8m}{{{\rho }_{air}}\cdot 0.47\cdot \pi \cdot {{D}^{2}}}$$

In particular, for typical values and neglecting wind effects or hop-up usage, a straight shot from a height of 1.8 m (5.9 ft) has a range of 34 m (37 yd). On ground hit, the impact energy of the pellet is 0.1 J. However, the same shot at close quarters (e.g. 5 m distance) has an impact energy of 1 J (see figure).

== Dangers to humans ==
Airsoft pellets travelling with sufficient velocity can leave small superficial wounds when hitting exposed skin. While this can be painful, these wounds are typically closed contusions and heal quickly without needing any medical attention. However, pellets can cause more serious damage to the more vulnerable parts of the body, such as the eyes and ears. Lower protective face masks are recommended during airsoft matches to shield players' nose, mouth, teeth and ears, and goggles or other protective eyewear are mandatory for eye protection.

The critical velocity required for skin penetration can be calculated using the formula:

$$v_\text{cr} = 162.1 e^{-0.38 \sqrt{m}}$$

where m is the mass of a spherical bullet, in grams. Penetration is defined here as entering the skin to a depth of more than half of the spherical pellet's diameter.

Accordingly, a typical 0.20 g airsoft pellet will penetrate the skin at 136.7 m/s (448 ft/s). Because many high-end AEGs, spring- and gas-powered airsoft guns can achieve such velocity at close ranges, many airsoft venues set strict limits on the maximum muzzle velocities allowed on the field, requiring each player to undergo a chronograph test prior to participating in a game. Some venues even have restrictions on minimal engagement distances, where shooting at opponents nearer than a set distance is prohibited, and a "bang bang" rule (players imitate firing by shouting "bang bang" instead of really firing the weapon) is often implemented.

The following excerpts from the United Kingdom Parliament's "Principles of Firearms Control" expound on the level of danger involved with low-energy projectiles:

"25. The Firearms Act 1968 defines a firearm "a lethal barreled weapon of any description from which any shot, bullet or other missile can be discharged". In this context, a "lethal weapon" means a weapon capable of firing a projectile with sufficient force to inflict more than a trivial injury, i.e. with a force sufficient to puncture the skin. The force with which a firearm is able to deliver a projectile is normally expressed in terms of the kinetic energy it generates at its muzzle—the "muzzle energy". This energy is normally expressed in units of foot-pounds (ft·lbs) or joules (J).

"26. The Home Office and the Forensic Science Service considers that the lowest level of muzzle energy capable of inflicting a penetrating wound is one foot pound force (1.35 J); below these power levels, weapons are "incapable of penetrating even vulnerable parts of the body, such as the eye". However, more recent analysis by the Forensic Science Agency for Northern Ireland has indicated that a more reasonable assessment of the minimum muzzle energy required to inflict a penetrating wound lies between 2.2 and 3.0 ft·lbf (3 to 4 J). We will deal more fully with this discrepancy at paragraphs 123 to 130 below."

"123. The power level at and above which an air weapon is considered a firearm in law is presently set at 1 ft·lbf. However, the Forensic Science Agency of Northern Ireland has more recently assessed the power level at which a barreled weapon is capable of inflicting a lethal wound as between 2.2 and 3 ft·lbf, and the Secretary of State for Northern Ireland has proposed that the law relating to firearms in Northern Ireland be amended to take this into account."

On another document also regarding firearms, "The Eleventh Annual Report of the Firearms Consultative Committee", the penetration levels lies between 2 and 3 J based on a research for US Army and DiMaio's work in "Minimal Velocities Necessary for Perforation of Skin by Air Pellets and Bullets, Journal of Forensic Sciences".

Date	Reference	Energy level	Observations
April 2000	Principles of firearms control [paragraph 26], Home Office and the Forensic Science Service;	1.35J	penetrating wound (later changed by paragraph 123, see below)
April 2000	Principles of firearms control [paragraph 123], Forensic Science Agency for Northern Ireland;	3.00J-4.00J	penetrating[26]/lethal[123] wound
March 2002	The Eleventh Annual Report of the Firearms Consultative Committee DiMaio's work in Minimal Velocities Necessary for Perforation of Skin by Air Pellets and Bullets, Journal of Forensic Sciences;	2.00J-3.00J	penetration level

== See also ==
- BB gun
- Pellet (air gun)
