= Tamiya DF-02 =

The DF-02 by Tamiya is a 1/10 scale R/C buggy, based on the popular TT-01 platform, released in 2004.

The buggy features a shaft-drive 4WD transmission with gear differentials front and rear, and independent suspension on all four wheels. It is recommended for beginners due to its relatively low cost and ease of building.

It is available in both kit and "Expert Built" ready-to-run form, with a choice of four different body styles (Plasma Edge, Gravel Hound, Rising Storm and Aero Avante). Several upgrade parts are available such as ball bearings, aluminium turnbuckles for adjusting camber and toe angles, and threaded-body shock absorbers.

In 2013, it was superseded by the all-new TT02B chassis. The last DF-02 model was released in 2014.

== See also ==
- Tamiya TT-01
