= Modern technique =

Method of using a handgun for self-defense using a two-handed grip

The modern technique (abbreviation of modern technique of the pistol) is a method for using a handgun for self-defense, originated by firearms expert Jeff Cooper. The modern technique uses a two-handed grip on the pistol and brings the weapon to eye level so that the sights may be used to aim at the target. This method was developed by Cooper into a teachable system beginning in the 1950s, based on the techniques of shooters like Jack Weaver, Mike Rousseau and others, after experiments with older techniques such as point shooting. The method was codified in book form in 1991 in The Modern Technique of the Pistol by Gregory B. Morrison and Cooper.

== History ==
In 1956, following a career in the United States Marine Corps where he served in World War II and the Korean War, and rose to the rank of lieutenant colonel, Jeff Cooper started holding Leatherslap shooting events and established the Bear Valley Gunslingers at Big Bear Lake, California. The initial events consisted of straight quick-draw matches, determining who could draw and hit a target at seven yards the fastest. They were the first matches of their kind, unrestricted as to technique, weapon, caliber, holster, or profession.

Initially, competitors primarily used some form of point shooting, a single-handed technique with the pistol fired from the hip, that was popular and believed to be the best-suited to the purpose. However, shooters would often discharge several rounds from the hip in rapid succession, but miss the 18-inch balloons seven yards away. One of the early champions, Jack Weaver, switched to an eye-level, two-handed, aimed technique. In his words, "a pretty quick hit was better than a lightning-fast miss."

Weaver's string of victories, resulting from his new method, influenced adoption of the technique and abandonment of point shooting. Soon, firearms trainers, most notably Cooper, began refining and codifying the concept; the result became the modern technique.

Over several years, the Bear Valley Gunslingers evolved into the South Western Combat Pistol League (SWCPL; known officially as the Southwest Pistol League (SWPL) – Cooper asserted that the word "combat" offended the then California Secretary of State, Frank M. Jordan). Their objective was to inject realism into pistol-shooting competition, thus developing the best methods of using a pistol for self-defense. The later competitions held at Big Bear were designed to represent actual and projected real-life situations, including shootings that some of the police officers attending the SWCPL had experienced. Six competitors consistently dominated the competitions, and these men became known as the Combat Masters: Jack Weaver, Ray Chapman, Elden Carl, Thell Reed, John Plähn, and Jeff Cooper.

The Combat Masters were given this title because, if they all competed, they would take the first six places, and if only one of them competed, ordinarily, he would be the winner. These competitions included highly accomplished world-class point shooters, such as Reed and Bob Munden (later known as the "world's fastest gun"), who competed using what would become the modern technique. Weaver is credited with originating the new two-handed Weaver Stance, Carl and Chapman refined it in competition, Plähn codified it, and Cooper publicized the new technique. Plähn, who possessed a PhD in physical education, filmed the Combat Masters in action to analyze what their winning techniques had in common. The most efficient movements were selected and integrated into the modern technique.

Others significant in the SWCPL included Leonard Knight (finished second in the first IPSC U.S. National Championship in 1977), Al Nichols, Jim Hoag, Bruce Nelson (designer of the "Summer Special" holster and an LEO in Southern California working in narcotics; present at the formation of IPSC and formed the Holster Committee), Michael Harries (former US Marine, who invented the Harries Technique of flashlight manipulation for use with a pistol, as well as becoming an instructor at Gunsite and consultant to police departments and the movie industry), and Jim Zubiena (appeared in the episode "Calderone's Return Part 1" of the TV series Miami Vice, a good example of the employment of the modern technique and the Mozambique drill in entertainment).

Cooper recognized several advances in pistolcraft prior to the modern technique:

- The work of William Fairbairn and Eric Sykes in Shanghai Municipal Police during the Twenties and Thirties.
- The FBI Practical Pistol Course in the 1930s, which consisted of timed shooting at seven, 25, 50 and 60 yards, holding the pistol in the strong hand, and then the weak hand, considered a significant improvement over the basic bullseye shooting taught previously.
- Cooper's own work in conjunction with fellow Marine Howland G. Taft on the Advanced Military Combat Pistol Course in 1948, which was incorporated into the US Army Field Manuals.

== Method ==
The modern technique comprises four central elements: an appropriately powerful weapon, and an effective way to hold it, aim it, and fire it. Cooper summarized the requirement and intended outcome in three Latin words:

- Diligentia - Accuracy: You must hit your assailant in order to injure him.
- Vis – Force: You must strike your opponent with sufficient force to incapacitate him.
- Celeritas – Speed: You must strike him quickly, so your opponent does not injure you before you injure him.

Cooper's personal motto, expressed as "DVC," and the phrase "front sight/press," are the main takeaways for students of the modern technique.

=== Semi-automatic pistol in a large caliber ===
The modern technique may be used with any handgun, but the .45 ACP caliber Colt M1911 semi-automatic pistol is universally associated with Jeff Cooper and the technique.

Jeff Cooper specified the use of a large caliber semi-automatic pistol as a component of the modern technique. He chose a large caliber because experience demonstrated that the largest quantity of force, and therefore damage, should be inflicted to maximize the chances of stopping even the most motivated and physically tough assailant.

The choice of magazine-fed semi-automatic handgun was because this firearm enabled continuous fire by allowing fresh magazines to be inserted quickly by the shooter. Most revolvers must be reloaded one cartridge at a time, which is a slower process than the replacement of a magazine in a semi-automatic pistol. Furthermore, reloading a revolver in the dark is very difficult, while reloading a semi-automatic pistol is relatively easy. During World War II (prior to developing the modern technique), after taking advice from a distinguished authority on gun fighting, Charles Askins, Jeff Cooper took a Colt Single Action Army revolver into combat in the Pacific theater and subsequently remarked that this advice nearly got him killed.

Bullet wounds vary in how much they incapacitate an assailant. The greater the injury inflicted, the greater the chance of killing one's assailant or wounding him so badly he is no longer able to fight. According to Cooper, larger caliber bullets, being bullets of greater diameter, are more likely to inflict wounds that bleed severely and incapacitate the assailant in a shorter period of time. Jeff Cooper's studies of reports from gun fights pointed to the greater effectiveness of larger diameter bullets in killing or incapacitating an assailant.

Pistols are not practical platforms for the launching of large projectiles because their small size, relative to rifles, decreases their capacity to absorb the force of recoil, increasing the proportion transmitted into the user's body. At calibers larger than .45 or .50, the negative impact on a shooter's control generally outweighs the benefits of a larger projectile. Hence Jeff Cooper's preference for a pistol launching a bullet of .45 diameter, or in the case of a shooter of such slight stature that they are unable to use a .45 caliber pistol, the use of a pistol firing a bullet of as large a diameter as is practical for the shooter to control.

The ability of different types and sizes of bullet to damage and incapacitate human beings and other creatures is called stopping power. Stopping power is a controversial subject because of the absence of data from controlled experiments and therefore a lack of scientific data that would demonstrate the superiority of one particular type of cartridge over another.

=== Weaver stance ===
The Weaver stance consists of two components. The first is gripping the pistol with two hands so that the slight forward pressure on the grip of the hand that drew the pistol is opposed by a rearward pressure on the grip of the second hand. This action aids in controlling the recoil of the pistol to stabilize the pistol for subsequent shots. The second component, and most commonly known, is the positioning of the feet in a walking stance, with the off-side foot ahead of the strong-side foot. A right-handed person will have the right foot angled out to the side and further to the rear. Most of the weight will be on the left foot, with the knee slightly bent. The shoulders will be leaned forward over the left toe. The right foot behind will help catch the force of recoil, as well as allow for rapid changes in position. For a left-handed person, this would all be reversed.

=== Flash sight picture ===
The Flash Sight Picture is a method of allowing the cognitive faculties of the shooter to align the target and the sights without the delay involved in the conscious alignment of sights, as used when slow-firing a rifle at a distant target. In point shooting, by contrast, the pistol is drawn from the holster and fired from the hip, without the sights being aligned at all.

In slow-fire rifle shooting, the front sight and rear sight of the rifle are aligned with the distant target with great care, taking at least several seconds.

The Flash Sight Picture technique falls between these two methods. During a gunfight, waiting to align the sights is too slow. However, more accuracy than point shooting is required to hit one's assailant reliably. It is physically impossible for the human eye to focus simultaneously on the rear sight (nearest to one's eye), the front sight (farther away from one's eye), and the relatively distant target at the same time. The muscles of the eye adjust to focus sight on one specific distance optimally at any one instant, so 3 different distances mean the shooter's focus must hunt (muscular physical adjustments) between all three points of mental concentration. The greatest adjustment of focus (relatively more ocular muscle contraction) is required to view shorter distances, such as the gun's rear sight. In the modern technique, the shooter is taught to focus on the front sight of the pistol and align it against the target, ignoring the rear sight for quicker aiming and minimal physical requirements. This prevents the focus of the eye from hunting between rear sight, front sight and target, wasting vital time in refocusing.

The technique is called "flash" sight picture because the cognition is best able to perform this function when the target and front sight are presented quickly as a single image, in a 'flash', as if the shooter had just turned around to face a threat appearing from close by. The shooter's vision can "see" the rear sight, even if the focus is on the front sight. This is enough for the cognition to make an alignment. With the flash sight picture, the front sight and a rapidly presented image of the target are used to align the pistol. This is faster than slow-fire rifle, and offers more chance of hitting the target than point shooting from the hip.

The cognitive functions of the brain align objects in the hand with distant objects at great speed. This ability of human cognition can be used to align the pistol with the target. Cooper discovered this specific ability and named it the "Flash Sight Picture".

Human cognition can perceive a "Flash Sight Picture" at a speed faster than conscious awareness. This facility was discovered during World War II experiments with rapid recognition of aircraft silhouettes. Experimentation was continued after the war and branched into subliminal advertising in the 1960s, where images were flashed onto cinema screens for a duration too short for the viewer to notice, yet for cognition to have observed the image nonetheless.

Use of the Flash Sight Picture requires a rapid acquisition of the front sight in order to allow the brain to perform its calculations. This focus on the front sight is one of the main themes Colonel Cooper impressed upon students of the modern technique to clear their minds when shooting during a confrontation. The emphasis for students of the modern technique on the word "front sight" was so great, that a shooting school and a shooting magazine were named after this phrase.

=== Compressed surprise break ===
Here the compressed, surprise break of the trigger is used to discharge the firearm.

In this technique, one should pull the trigger to have the shot break as if it were a glass rod. When the compression of the trigger by the finger reaches an appropriate point, the "glass rod" of the trigger will break and discharge the firearm. The "surprise break" of the "glass rod" means the pistol remains aligned on the target while the muscles in the shooter's hand adjust from merely gripping the pistol to depressing the trigger at the same time. This disturbance in the muscles of the hand, while it attempts to move the trigger backwards while still holding the pistol steady, can cause the alignment of the firearm to shift, causing the shot to miss the target. The gradual compression of the trigger by the hand muscles means the alignment may be observed by the eye during the process of compression and kept on the target, regardless of slight changes to the alignment introduced by the muscles of the hand starting to squeeze the trigger.

This process must take place as fast as possible, yet without disturbing the pistol.

=== Cooper's color code ===
During training in the modern technique Cooper emphasized that readiness was everything.

Cooper asserted that if the individual weren't prepared to encounter danger at all times, the technique used and the pistol selected were of no consequence. To underscore this point and give students a reference with which to evaluate their own behavior, Cooper developed a color code of readiness, consisting of four states of readiness:

- White – Readiness is non-existent. The individual's readiness is unaware (same as would be if he were asleep, or reading a book, or otherwise without any perception of his surroundings or movements within them).
- Yellow – Readiness is aware, but unspecific. The individual is aware of his surroundings and monitoring what is happening in those surroundings.
- Orange – Readiness is a specific alert. The individual is aware of any activity or person within his surroundings which presents a threat.
- Red – Readiness to face danger. Fight mode (although not necessarily shooting yet). The individual is aware of a specific immediate threat, which will likely result in the use of deadly force. Individual will shoot if his predetermined "mental trigger" is tripped.

Cooper's color code is frequently mistaken as an indicator of danger rather than an indicator of readiness. The color code was developed as a mental crutch to get over the resistance of using deadly force (it is not a warning system). The student may be in grave danger, but may be asleep and thus his level of readiness is "Condition White", with readiness being unaware. For most individuals, even those whose occupations take them to dangerous regions, awareness condition Yellow will be the condition they spend 99% of their waking lives within. Specific threats, leading to readiness in Condition Orange (specific alert) would be rare. Condition Red (fight) is even more rare.

This color code of readiness has been adopted by third parties, including the US Marine Corps.

To promote situational awareness, Cooper endorsed what is known as the "Dollar Club" – Gunsite "family members" were expected to be members. When two members of the Dollar Club met, the one who saw and recognized the other first could claim a dollar from the less-aware member. Cooper also stated that any family member who got a traffic ticket should pay it, because a properly aware driver should see police cars in time to avoid citation.

== Development and training ==
=== Analysis of gunfights ===
Cooper requested his students report back to him if they had been involved in gunfights, so that he might build up a body of reference material against which the modern technique could be evaluated and altered or extended. This body of reference material was built over 50 years, encompassing nearly 40 gunfights. The reports drawn from the experience of those involved in gunfights continued the tradition of reflecting real situations in the courses of competition set up for the South Western Combat Pistol League.

To further refine the modern technique and the methods used in its training, Cooper continued to compile reports of gunfights from students of the technique until his death, building the largest collection of data of its kind. As a result of analyzing this body of material, Cooper developed several training drills:

==== Mozambique Drill – 1974 ====
Jeff Cooper described the Mozambique drill as such in his Commentaries:

I added The Mozambique Drill to the modern doctrine after hearing of an experience of a student of mine up in Mozambique when that country was abandoned. My friend was involved in the fighting that took place around the airport of Lourenço Marques. At one point, Mike turned a corner and was confronted by a terrorist carrying an AK47. The man was walking toward him at from perhaps 10 paces. Mike, who was a good shot, came up with his P-35 and planted two satisfactory hits, one on each side of the wishbone. He expected his adversary to drop, but nothing happened, and the man continued to close the range. At this point, our boy quite sensibly opted to go for the head and tried to do so, but he was a little bit upset by this time and mashed slightly on the trigger, catching the terrorist precisely between the collar bones and severing his spinal cord. This stopped the fight.

The effect of a bullet striking the human body depends greatly on which organ is struck during penetration. In some instances, the assailant might drop quickly; in others, there might be no apparent effect. A bullet striking the brain kills the assailant almost without exception. Recognizing that similar situations would occur, Cooper popularized the term Mozambique drill based on the technique improvised by his student there. This drill consists of shooting two rounds to the center of the torso, followed by a pause and assessment of the situation and then a more carefully aimed shot to the head, specifically, in the triangle formed between the eyes and the base of the nose. The "head shot" is required to enter this "fatal triangle" because any other shot in the head with a handgun runs a higher chance of being non-debilitating because of striking thicker cranial bones or the teeth. Under nearly any condition, engaging an assailant with the Mozambique drill should offer a high probability that one's assailant will be stopped and likely killed.

==== El Presidente – 1977 ====
The "El Presidente" drill was invented by Cooper while training the protection squad for the president of a South American country. The drill consists of three targets. The shooter starts by facing away from the targets. On the signal to start, the shooter turns and shoots each target twice, before reloading and shooting each target twice again. The shooter's performance is scored by taking account of both the number of hits and the time taken to achieve those hits.

==== Dozier Drill – 1981 ====
A further example of the expansion of the modern technique was the invention of the "Dozier Drill". This drill was invented by Cooper after the kidnapping of US Army Brigadier General James L. Dozier by Italian Red Brigade terrorists. The terrorists had entered General Dozier's apartment by posing as plumbers. As many as eight comprised the gang and four or perhaps five entered the apartment. One of the terrorists removed a submachine gun from his bag of tools while another terrorist read a political statement to General Dozier. At that time, U.S. military personnel were prohibited by Italian law from carrying firearms within their areas of accommodation, which were within the local community and not on U.S. bases. General Dozier was unarmed and unable to defend himself. In response to this incident, Cooper designed the "Dozier drill".

In this drill, the range is set with five metal silhouette targets hinged at their base (called "Pepper Poppers") so as to fall backward when struck. A second participant stands far to one side and is tasked with retrieving a pistol and a magazine from a tool bag, which he must assemble and ready for action. This action mimics the terrorist who retrieved his submachine gun from his tool bag and provides a datum against which the shooter must compare his performance. On the signal, the shooter must draw his pistol and engage the five targets representing the terrorists, before the terrorist retrieves his pistol and readies it for use.

=== International Practical Shooting Confederation ===
In May 1976 Jeff Cooper was present at the conference that founded the International Practical Shooting Confederation (IPSC) and served as the first IPSC president. According to Jim Wilson and Jeff Cooper, the IPSC initially reflected a practical emphasis on self-defense but in subsequent decades IPSC became more focused on sport shooting and lost its original focus.

=== American Pistol Institute/Gunsite ===
Jeff Cooper went on to codify and promulgate the modern technique in his work after the Big Bear Leatherslaps. He traveled the world providing training in the technique to security teams protecting heads of state, prominent politicians and wealthy individuals. In 1976 Jeff Cooper founded the American Pistol Institute (API) at Gunsite Ranch just north of Paulden in Yavapai County, Arizona, to provide training in the technique to a larger audience of military personnel, law enforcement officers and citizens. The American Pistol Institute was renamed Gunsite.

== Criticism ==
Critics of the modern technique and its components point out that some elements of the technique existed before Jeff Cooper codified them. For example, there are a few photographs of shooters predating World War II showing shooters using the Weaver stance. Jeff Cooper claims that while individual shooters such as these may have used individual components of what would become the modern technique, what did not happen until the advent of the modern technique was the testing of different techniques, the determination of the most advantageous techniques by comparison in realistic simulations, and the codification of the assembled techniques into a doctrine. Contrasting this are texts such as Kill or Get Killed by Col. Rex Applegate that describe the flash sight picture and Weaver stance (though not using those terms) and the accuracy of the shooters compared to those trained in other methods.

== Legacy ==
Gradually, some people working with firearms, such as close protection teams and special forces units of Russia and Belarus, moved toward adopting doctrines and formal training regimes. Frequently, their doctrines adopted largely contain elements of the modern technique (such as the Weaver stance) or use the technique in its entirety.

== See also ==
- Combat pistol shooting
- Gun fu
