= Nostalgia drag racing =

Nostalgia drag racing is a form of drag racing that uses cars from earlier eras of drag racing, as well as cars built to fit the guidelines of earlier eras using parts that would have been available in that era.

The cars raced are a mixture between restored originals, while others are re-creations of older cars. Today, nostalgia drag racing events are held in the United States from coast-to-coast run by organizations, groups, tracks along with the NHRA and IHRA. Nostalgia drag racing is gaining in popularity as the original drag racers become old. There are many nostalgia drag racing teams trying to preserve the vehicles and racing culture of the 1960s and 1970s.

== History ==
After Henry Ford started making automobiles more affordable for Americans by manufacturing them on an assembly line, it wasn't long until people started racing them. Drag racing is defined as straight line speed races. Initially highly illegal, the first legal drag racing track was set up on an Orange County Airport runway in 1950 by C.J. Hart in Santa Ana, California. In 1991, C.J. Hart was inducted into the International Drag Racing Hall of Fame. In 1999 he also joined the Motorsports Hall of Fame of America.

Though 'drag racing' began with the meeting of the first few automobiles, its real allure began in the 1950s, fueled by such writers as Henry Felsen and the need for excitement not hindered by war and the Great Depression. Chuck Klein revived the 50s nostalgia of this era with set-in-the-fifties hot rod intensive books Circa 1957 and The Way it Was, Nostalgic Tales of Hot Rods and Romance and his columns in Street Rod Action Magazine and Nostalgia Drag World.

Drag racing has continued, with six types of cars used: Top Fuel, Funny Cars, Pro Stock, Pro Stock bikes, Top Fuel Dragsters and Pro Stock trucks. Top fuel cars are the fastest cars used, nitromethane fueled, can accelerate from 0 to 100 mph in under a second and can reach 330 mph. Funny cars are fueled by nitromethane and methanol, use a forward mounted engine on an aerodynamic carbon fiber car body. Pro Stock cars are powered by gasoline, and cannot use turbo charging, super charging, or nitrous oxide. Pro stock bikes are nitromethane-powered motorcycles which are regulated similarly to pro stock cars. Top Fuel Dragsters were built specifically for drag racing, use 90% nitromethane and 10% alcohol with an engine just behind the driver and use a parachute to slow them down at the end of a race. Pro stock trucks use gasoline.

Nostalgia drag racing started in California in 1981 when old racers started using their front-engine "slingshot" dragsters, funny cars and Super Stockers to race again at Fremont drag strip also known as Baylands raceway park where the N.D.R.A. "nostalgia drag racing association" was formed by Tom Prufer along with partners Brian Burnett & Ken Foster in 1981 kicking things off with a match race between T V Tommy Ivo's Rislone jet dragster vs. the " California Kid" 34 ford from the movie of the same name starring Martin Sheen. After Fremont closed in Dec. 1988 the W.C.T.A. "west coast timing association" was formed by the same 3 people at Sacramento Raceway and a competing series was introduced at Sonoma Raceway.

In 2008, in support of Nostalgia drag racing, NHRA Museum started the Hot Rod Heritage Series, which has races across the U.S. with most of the points races on the West Coast. The Cacklefest features push starts with flames shooting out of the zoomies and the smell of nitro in the air everywhere. The March Meet at Famoso Raceway is the biggest sporting event in California every March. In Marion, Ohio in August of each year is the largest gathering of old-school blown alcohol nostalgia funny cars at the Marion County Nostalgia Funny Car Nationals.

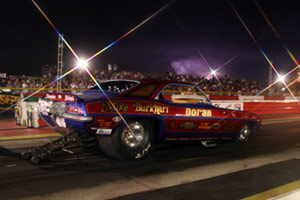
2010 Marion County's Nostalgia Funny Car Nationals

== See also ==
- Historic motorsport
