= Mozambique drill =

Firearm shooting technique

The Mozambique drill, also known as the failure drill, failure to stop drill, or informally as "two to the body, one to the head", is a close-quarters shooting technique that requires the shooter to fire twice into the torso of a target (known as a double tap or hammered pair to the center of mass), and follow up with a more difficult shot to the head that, if properly placed, should kill or otherwise stop the target if the previous shots failed to do so.

== History ==
According to anecdotal history, the technique originated with Mike Rousseau, a Rhodesian mercenary taking part in the Mozambican War of Independence (1964–1974). While engaged in combat at the Lourenço Marques Airport in what is now Maputo, Mozambique, Rousseau rounded a corner and encountered a FRELIMO fighter armed with an AK-47 at ten paces (7.5 m (25 ft)) from his position. Rousseau fired two rounds from his Browning Hi-Power pistol into the fighter's upper chest, usually enough to incapacitate or kill outright; however, seeing that the fighter was still advancing, Rousseau attempted a head shot that hit the fighter through the base of his neck, severing the spinal cord and killing him. Rousseau relayed the story to an acquaintance, small arms expert Jeff Cooper, founder of the Gunsite Academy shooting school, who incorporated the "Mozambique drill" into his modern technique shooting method.

The Mozambique drill was incorporated in the Gunsite curriculum from the late 1970s. In 1980, two Los Angeles Police Department Metropolitan Division SWAT officers, Larry Mudgett and John Helms, attended pistol training at Gunsite and received permission from Cooper to teach the technique to the LAPD. Concerned that "Mozambique" could have racist overtones, the officers renamed it the Failure Drill.

Most special forces were trained in the technique during the 1980s. Following the September 11 attacks, the changing nature of counterterrorism and counterinsurgency threats—and the chance of encountering suicide bomb vests—led to it being largely replaced by other techniques within special forces units. The practice of firing rounds in pairs has been retained, but modern approaches rely on higher magazine capacities to prioritize target incapacitation over conserving ammo. For example, special forces may be trained to fire two pairs at the target's pelvic girdle to immobilize and cause the target to fall and then as many rounds at the chest or head as necessary or multiple pairs at the center of the target's body followed by one pair to the head with the plan to repeat this pattern until the target can be confirmed down.

== Theory and technique ==
The Mozambique drill is intended to ensure that the target is immediately stopped, by first placing two shots into the larger, easier-to-hit mass of the upper body, then, if the target is still active, following with a third, more precisely aimed and difficult head shot. Due to factors such as body armor, the bolstering effect of drugs, or failure to hit vital organs, the body shots may not be immediately effective, necessitating the third shot. To ensure instant incapacitation by impacting the brain and central nervous system, the head shot should be delivered to the area between eyebrows and upper lip where the bone is thinnest.

== In popular culture ==
In the television series Miami Vice, Jim Zubiena performed the Mozambique drill during his appearance as Ludovici Armstrong, a hitman hired by Calderone, in the episode "Calderone's Return: The Hit List" (Part 1). Zubiena also served as the show's firearms instructor.

The 2004 film Collateral, starring Tom Cruise, features a scene in which Cruise's character executes the Mozambique drill with expert proficiency. Cruise trained for months using live ammunition to perfect the shooting skills demonstrated in the film.

== See also ==
- Glossary of firearms terms
- Practical shooting
- Stopping power
