= Chuck Klein (author) =

American author

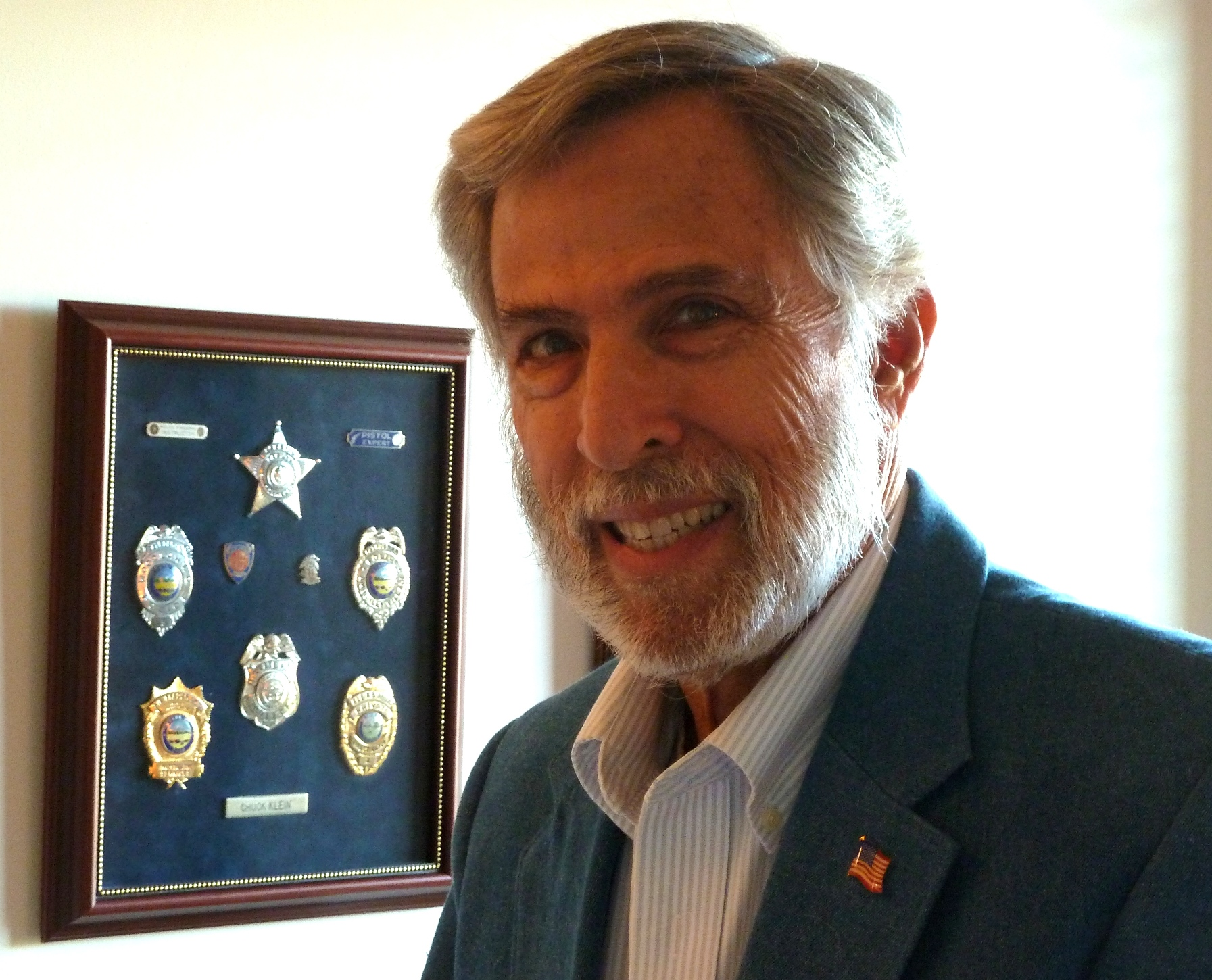
- Born: Charles Henle Klein, Jr. March 20, 1942 (age 84)
- Education: Bachelor of Laws, Blackstone School of Law, 1972
- Occupations: Author; Firearms instructor

Charles Henle Klein Jr. (born March 20, 1942), is an American author, best known for writing about police ethics, and the technique of instinct combat shooting, He is also a firearms instructor, a former law enforcement officer and a retired private investigator.

== Career ==
Klein was a police officer in Ohio from 1968 to 1975 and later his family had moved to Indiana and Klein became a police officer there. He is a NRA (National Rifle Association) certified firearms instructor in five disciplines and is a former staff instructor for Tactical Defense Institute.

From 1979 to 2004, Chuck Klein was licensed as a private detective in Indiana and then Ohio.

In 1992, Klein wrote "America Is Beautiful", which was read into the U.S. Congressional Record. He wrote Lines of Defense, Police Ideology and the Constitution in 2000 to raise awareness for law enforcement officers of their constitutional obligations. In 2004, Klein wrote about instinct shooting in his book, Instinct Combat Shooting, Defensive Handgunning for Police as a result of studying police training methods. Klein is also known for writing The Badge, Stories and Tales from Both Sides of the Law and the autobiographical novel Circa 1957.

== Selected bibliography ==
- "America is Beautiful," The United States Congressional Record, 1992
- Lines of Defense, Police Ideology and the Constitution. 2000, Institute of Police Technology and Management. (ISBN 9781884566400)
- Guns in the WorkPlace, A Manual for Private Sector Employers and Employees, 2006, Merril Press. (ISBN 9780936783499)
- The Badge, Stories and Tales from Both Sides of the Law. 2011, BeachHouse Press. (ISBN 9781596300712)
- Circa 1957, 2nd Edition, 2012, BeachHouse Press. (ISBN 9780962718403)
- Where the Old Highway Had Run: Classic Tales of the Road and Beyond, 2015, BeachHouse Books. (ISBN 9781596300989)
- Instinct Combat Shooting, Defensive Handgunning for Police, 4th Edition, 2016, CRC Press Taylor & Francis Group. (ISBN 9781498766913)
- America's Framework For Freedom, A Simplified Look At The U.S. Constitution, 2020, Second Amendment Foundation & U.S. Concealed Carry Association.

== See also ==
- Point shooting
- Criminal justice ethics
- Nostalgia drag racing
