= BB gun =

Air gun that uses metallic ball projectiles called BBs

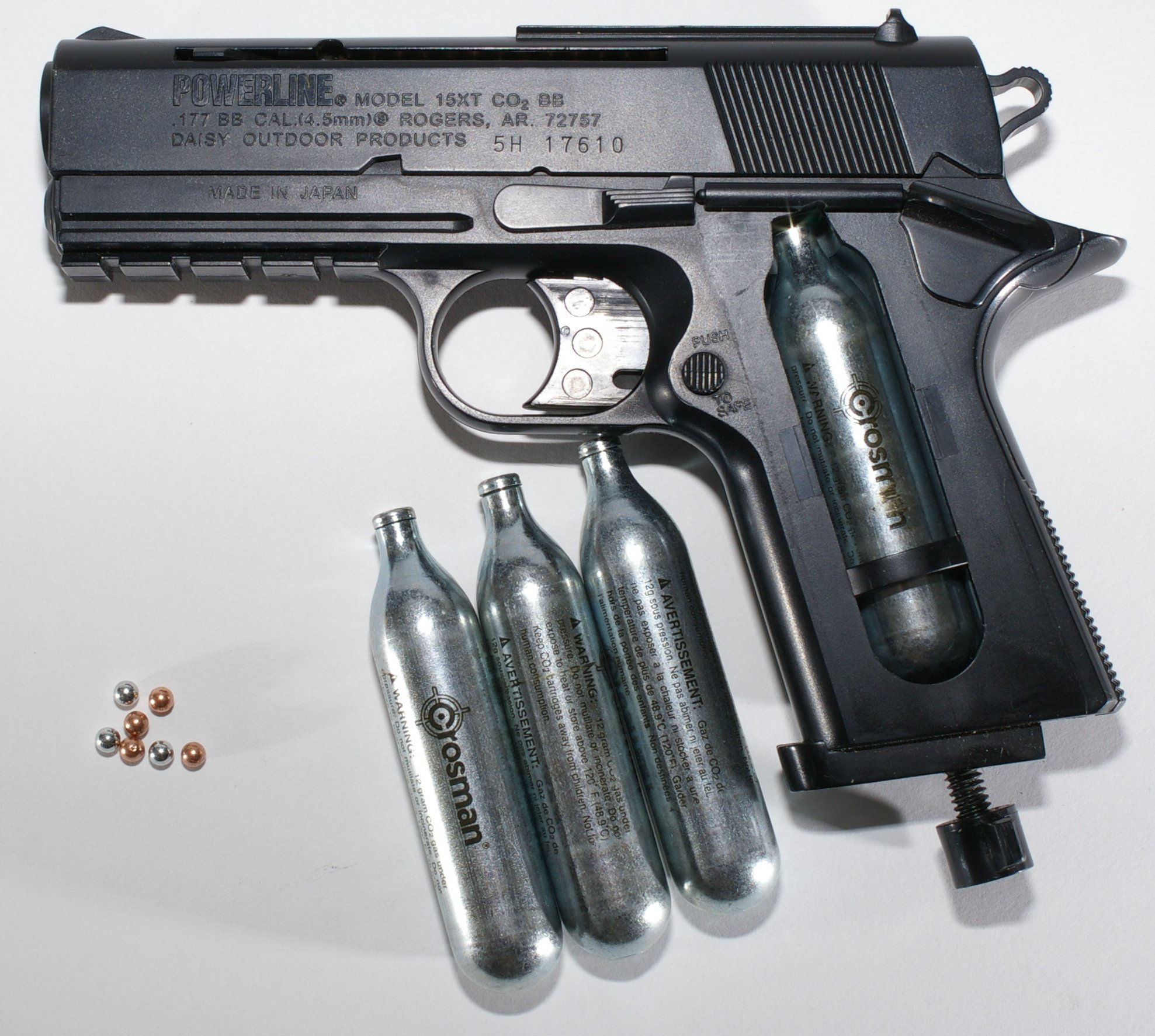
BB pistol with CO_{2} cartridges and BBs

A BB gun is a type of air gun that fires metallic spherical projectiles called BBs (not to be confused with similar-looking bearing balls), which are approximately the same size as BB-size lead birdshot used in shotguns (0.180 in or 4.6 mm in diameter). Modern BB guns usually have a smoothbore barrel of 4.5 mm (0.177 in) caliber, and use steel balls that measure 4.3–4.4 mm (0.171–0.173 in) in diameter and 0.33–0.35 g (5.1–5.4 gr) in weight, usually zinc- or copper-plated for corrosion resistance. Some manufacturers still make the slightly larger traditional lead BBs that weigh around 0.48–0.50 g (7.4–7.7 gr), which are generally intended for use in rifled barrels (because lead is more malleable and exerts less wear on the rifling).

The term "BB gun" is sometimes incorrectly used to refer to airsoft guns, which shoot plastic pellets (also often referred to as "BBs") that are larger (usually 6 mm or 0.24 in in diameter) but much less dense than metal BBs, and have significantly lower ballistic performance. The term is sometimes mistakenly used to describe a pellet gun, which shoots diabolo-shaped (not spherical) lead projectiles at higher power and velocity. Although some BB guns can also shoot pellets, the reverse situation is not true: steel BB balls have greater stiffness and are not meant to be shot from pellet guns, whose barrels are typically rifled, where they can become lodged in the barrel, potentially damaging the rifling or causing mechanical failure and leading to damage or mechanical failure within the pellet gun.

== History ==
The term "BB" originated from the nomenclature of the size of lead shots used in a smoothbore shotgun. Size "BB" shots were nominally 0.180 in (4.6 mm), but tended to vary considerably in size because of the loose tolerances in shotshells. The largest shotgun pellet commonly used was named "00" or "double ought" and was used for hunting deer and thus called "buckshot", while the smaller BB-sized shot was typically used to shoot small/medium-sized game birds and called "birdshot".

In 1886, the Markham Air Rifle Company in Plymouth, Michigan, produced the first wooden-construct spring-piston air rifle design as a youth training gun, and used the BB lead shot as the ammunition. Two years later, the neighbouring Plymouth Air Rifle Company (renamed Daisy Manufacturing Company in 1895) introduced the first full-metal airgun that also fired BB shots – the Daisy BB Gun, which became a very popular household name because of successful marketing. Around 1900, Daisy changed their BB-size bore diameter to 0.175 in (4.4 mm), and began to market precision-made lead shot specifically for their BB guns. They called these "round shots", but the "BB" name was already well established, and consequently most users continued calling their guns "BB guns", and the projectiles as "BB shots" or just "BBs".

Subsequently, the term "BB" became generic, and is used loosely referring to any small spherical projectiles of various calibers and materials. This includes bearing balls often utilized by anti-personnel mines, .177 caliber lead/steel shots used by air guns, plastic round balls (such as the pellets used by airsoft guns), small marbles and many others. It has become ubiquitous to refer to any steel ball, such as a BB, as a "ball bearing". However, BBs should not be confused with a ball bearing, which is a mechanical component using small internal rolling balls to reduce friction between moving parts of machines.

== Operation ==
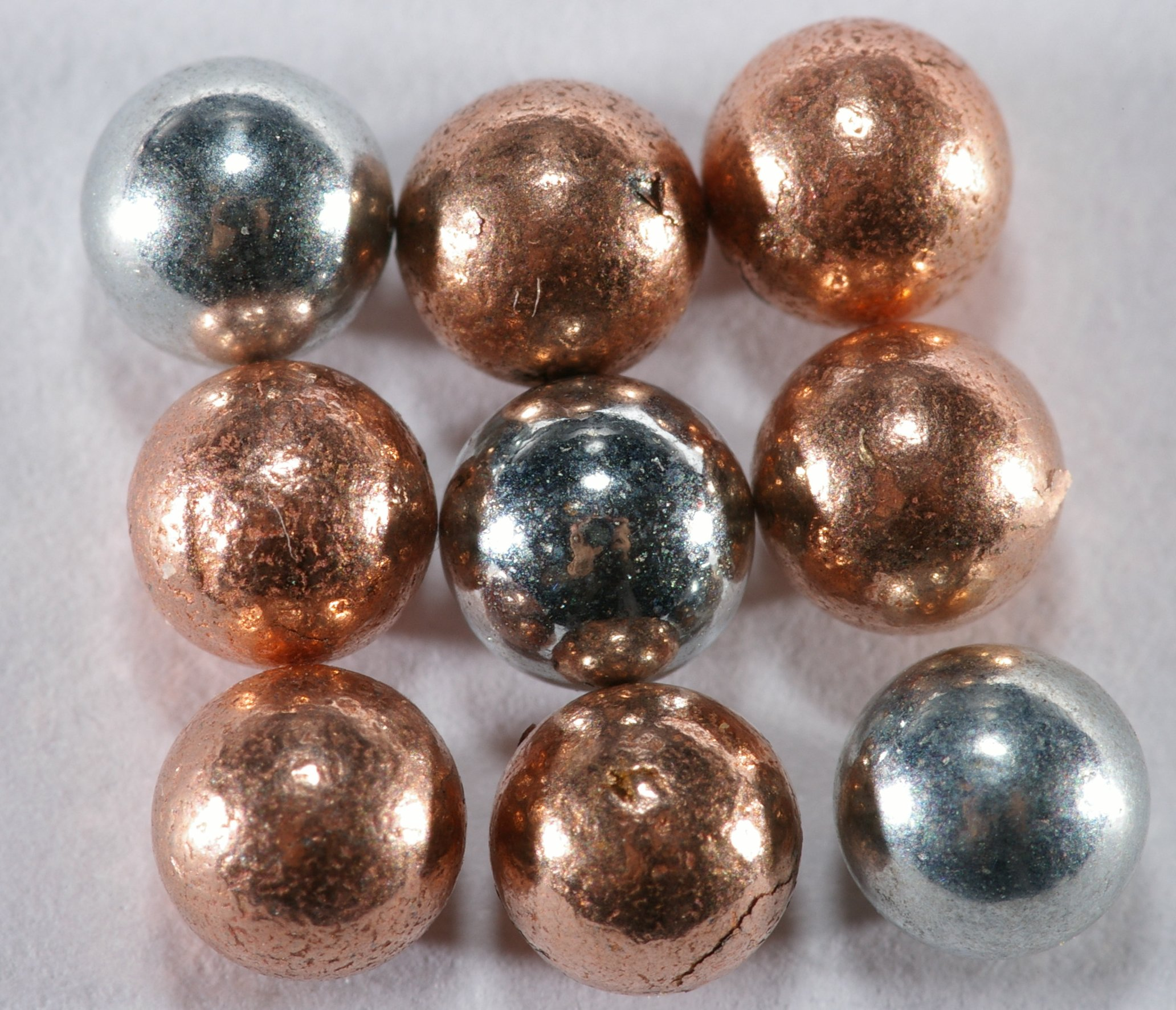
Steel BBs with copper or zinc jackets

BB guns can use any of the operating mechanisms used for air guns. However, because the projectile inherently has limited accuracy and short effective range, only the simpler and less expensive mechanisms are generally used for guns designed to fire only BBs.

Because the strength of the steel BB does not allow it to be swaged with the low propelling force used to accelerate it through the barrel, BBs are slightly smaller (4.3 to 4.4 mm (0.171 to 0.173 in)) than the internal diameter of the barrel (4.5 mm (0.177 in)). This limits accuracy because little spin is imparted on the BB. It also limits range, because some of the pressurized gas used to accelerate the BB leaks around it and reduces the overall efficiency. Since a BB will easily roll unhindered down the barrel, it is common to find guns that use a magnet in the loading mechanism to hold the BB at the rear of the barrel until it is fired.

The traditional and still most common powerplant for BB guns is the spring-piston pump, usually patterned after a lever-action rifle or a pump-action shotgun. The lever-action rifle was the first type of BB gun, and still dominates the inexpensive youth BB gun market. The Daisy Model 25, modeled after a pump-action shotgun with a trombone pump-action mechanism, dominated the low-price, higher-performance market for over 60 years (1914–1978). Lever-action models generally have very low velocities, around 84 m/s (275 ft/s), a result of the weak springs used to keep cocking efforts low for use by youths. The Daisy Model 25 typically achieved the highest velocities of its day, ranging from 114 to 145 m/s (375 to 475 ft/s).

Multiple-pump pneumatic guns are also common. Many pneumatic pellet guns provide the ability to use BBs as a cheaper alternative to lead shot. Some of these guns have rifled barrels, but the slightly undersized BBs do not swage in the barrel, so the rifling does not impart a significant spin. These are the types of guns that will benefit most from using precision lead BB shot. Pneumatic BB guns can also attain higher velocities than traditional spring-piston types.

The last common type of power for BB guns is compressed gas, most commonly the Powerlet cartridges. The powerlet is a disposable metal gas cylinder containing 12 grams (185 gr) of compressed carbon dioxide, with a self-contained valve to release the CO_{2} which expands to propel the BB. These are primarily used in BB pistols, and are capable of rapid firing unlike spring-piston or pneumatic types. A typical CO_{2} BB pistol uses a spring-loaded magazine to feed BBs, and a double-action trigger mechanism to chamber a BB and cock the hammer. However some guns (either to stay true to the original gun or to make the trigger pull easier) do have a single-action trigger. Either type of gun may also have blowback action, where CO_{2} will push the slide back in addition to firing a BB. When firing, the hammer strikes an internal valve linked to the CO_{2} source, which releases a measured amount of CO_{2} gas to fire the BB; this also gives it realistic recoil and muzzle report features. Many CO_{2} BB guns are patterned after popular firearms such as the Colt M1911, and can be used for training as well as recreation.

Some gas-powered BB guns use a larger source of gas, and provide machine gun-like fire. These types, most notably the Shooting Star Tommy Gun (originally known as the Feltman) are commonly found at carnivals. The MacGlashan BB Gun was used to train antiaircraft gunners in the United States Army Air Corps and United States Navy during World War II. A popular commercial model was the Larc M-19, which used 1 pound (454 g) canisters of Freon-12 refrigerant. These types have very simple operating mechanisms, based on a venturi pump. The gas is released in a constant stream, and this is used to suck the BBs up into the barrel at rates as high as 3600 rounds per minute.

== Safety ==
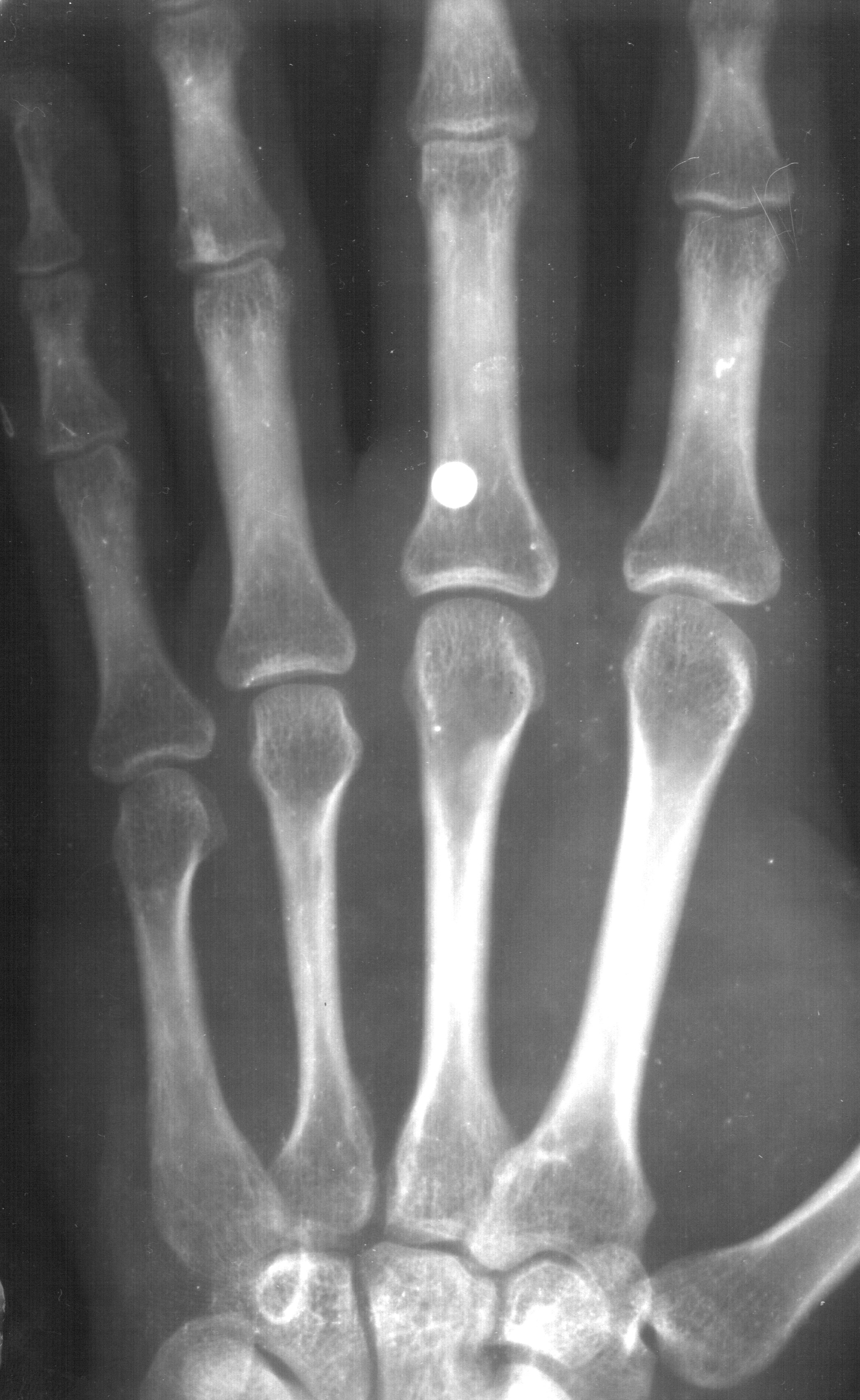
BB gun injury showing a 4.5 mm steel BB that penetrated the middle finger on the left hand

BB guns can shoot faster than 60 m/s (200 ft/s), but are often less powerful than a conventional pellet airgun. Pellet airguns have the ability to fire considerably faster, even beyond 170 m/s (560 ft/s). Although claims are often exaggerated, a few airguns can actually fire a standard 0.177 caliber lead pellet faster than 320 m/s (1,000 ft/s), but these are generally not BB-firing guns.

A BB with a velocity of only 45 m/s (150 ft/s) has skin-piercing capability, and a velocity reaching 60 m/s (200 ft/s) can fracture bone. This is potentially lethal, and this potential increases with velocity, but also rapidly decreases with distance. The effective penetrating range of a BB gun with a muzzle velocity of 120 to 180 m/s (390 to 590 ft/s) is approximately 18 m (60 ft). A person wearing jeans at this distance would not sustain serious injury. However, even at this distance a BB still might penetrate bare skin, and even if not, could leave a severe and painful bruise. The maximum range of a BB gun in the 120 to 180 m/s (390 to 590 ft/s) range is 100–200 metres approximately, provided the muzzle is elevated to the optimum angle.

Steel BBs are prone to ricochet off hard surfaces such as brick, concrete, metal, or wood end grain. Unlike lead pellets, which usually flatten and absorb energy upon impact, a BB bouncing off a hard surface can retain a large portion of its initial energy, and could easily cause serious eye damage. Wearing eye protection is essential when shooting BBs at these materials, more so than when shooting lead pellets.

== Quick Kill training ==
The U.S. Army trained recruits in Quick Kill techniques using Daisy Model 99 BB guns to improve soldiers using their weapons in the Vietnam War from 1967 to 1973. The technique was developed for the Army by Bobby Lamar "Lucky" McDaniel and Mike Jennings.

== Legal status ==
BB guns are often regulated as a typical air gun. Air gun laws vary widely by local jurisdiction.

== See also ==
- Paintball marker
- List of air guns
