= Eric A. Sykes =

British army officer

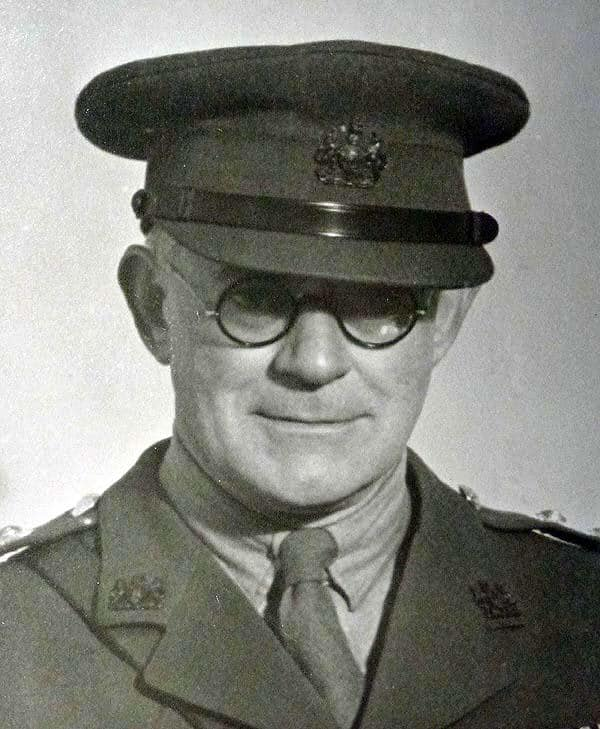
Eric A. Sykes

Major Eric Anthony Sykes (5 February 1883 – 12 May 1945), born Eric Anthony Schwabe, was a soldier and firearms expert. He is most famous for his work with William E. Fairbairn in the development of the eponymous Fairbairn–Sykes fighting knife and modern British Close Quarters Battle (CQB) martial arts during World War II. Originally working for an import/export company selling weapons in East Asia, he claimed he volunteered for and served in the British Army as a sharpshooter on the Western Front during World War I. Returning to China in 1917, he joined the volunteer branch of the Shanghai Municipal Police (SMP) Specials with the rank of Inspector in 1926.

== Background ==
Sykes was born Eric Anthony Schwabe in Barton-upon-Irwell, Eccles, Greater Manchester, England, the son of Lawrence Schwabe, a Manchester-born letter press printer, and Octavie, his German wife from Cologne, Germany. By 1891 the family had moved south to Bromley in Kent near to Sevenoaks where his father worked as a cotton trader. He grew up at No. 40 Marlowes, Hemel Hempstead and by 1901 was working as a clerk for the county council. The reasons for his name change in 1917 were said to be that he found it "too Germanic". A shikari hunter, he was an avid rifleman and an expert with the pistol. He first arrived in Shanghai in 1907 while working for Reiss & Co. He met Fairbairn in 1919, then with the Shanghai Municipal Police (SMP), beginning their famous professional association. In 1923 Sykes was working for the China & Japan Trading Co. as China representative for Remington and Colt. It was not until 1926 that Sykes officially joined the SMP as an unpaid, part-time volunteer officer in the reserve, and in 1929 he joined S.J. David & Co., where he worked until his departure from China in 1940.

While working for S.J. David & Co., his experience in sharpshooting and his personal friendship with Fairbairn led him to form and oversee a team of civilian and police snipers for the SMP. He became the head of this unit in 1937, working part-time in this capacity until he resigned this position in 1939. In 1940, Fairbairn resigned from the Shanghai Municipal Police and returned to Britain, with Sykes following. The pair had apparently planned this, since they shipped crates full of illegal weapons from lax Shanghai into Britain on their boat. He joined the British Special Operations Executive (AKA SOE), where he worked at the Special Training Centre in Lochailort, Scotland.

== Wartime service ==
Fairbairn and Sykes were both commissioned as second lieutenants on the British Army, General List on 15 July 1940.

After training special forces units throughout 1940, the two were finally commissioned into the British Army on the General List of 1941. Their book Shooting to Live, published in 1942, is considered by many to be the classic text of pistol combat, and one of the best codifications of the high-stress point shooting method. Nevertheless, this was the last time the pair worked together in any capacity; by mid-1942 the pair's friendship had split, with Sykes claiming that Fairbairn treated him as an inferior. Soon thereafter, Fairbairn travelled to Canada to teach armed and unarmed combat to commandos and covert agents of the Americas at Camp X. Sykes stayed in Great Britain, training Special Operations Executive (SOE) agents at the various Special Training Centres before being assigned to train the joint UK/US Jedburgh teams at Milton Hall.

Relinquishing his commission in the rank of Captain due to disability on 6 April 1945 he was allowed to retain the honorary rank of Major.

He died at Bexhill-on-Sea, England on 12 May 1945.

Sykes reputedly ended every self-defence lecture with his trademark phrase "and then, kick him in the testicles" as this method ensures that regardless of the effectiveness of the given tactic used, the assailant would be at least moderately incapacitated.

== See also ==
- Combatives
- William E. Fairbairn
- Fairbairn–Sykes fighting knife
- Point shooting
