= Hop-up (airsoft) =

Backspin on airsoft pellets and BBs

Soft airgun projectile rotation via "Hop-Up" mechanism

Hop-up is the backspin put on airsoft pellets and BBs to increase their range via the Magnus effect.

Hop-up devices apply backspin to the projectile reducing the air pressure on its top side. This causes the plastic pellet to fall less over a given distance than it would without the spin applied, extending the effective range of the weapon without increasing velocity. It allows the mechanism to shoot BBs in a curved trajectory.

In airsoft guns, this is usually implemented as a small rubber protrusion, called a bucking, into the path of the projectile, on the top of the barrel. The bucking momentarily hinders the top side of the projectile, imparting a backspin that can exceed 1,000 rpm (17 rotations per second). This is usually adjustable through means of a dial or set screw so that the effect can be tuned to suit the weight and speed of the projectile and each player's preference.

The primary cause of the lift is the Magnus effect. There is a layer of non-moving air (the boundary layer) on its surface. In the case of a spinning ball, this layer gets thrown off at an angle. Newton's laws state that in order for air to be thrown in one direction, the ball has to move in the opposite direction. According to the Magnus explanation, the rotating ball would throw air downward and to the rear, thus giving lift. The boundary layers on the top and bottom separate unevenly, creating a wake that is lower than the middle of the ball, appearing like a comet's tail pointing down. This can be verified in wind tunnels and is well documented in fluid dynamics textbooks.
