= Point shooting =

Shooting method where the weapon's sights are not used or relied on

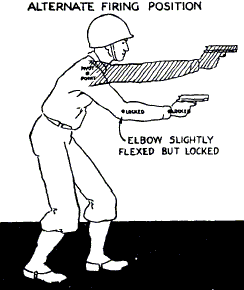
Side view of handgun point shooting position

Point shooting (also known as target- or threat-focused shooting, intuitive shooting, instinctive shooting, subconscious tactical shooting, or hipfiring) is a practical shooting method where the shooter points a ranged weapon (typically a repeating firearm) at a target without relying on the use of sights to aim. Emphasis is placed on fast draw and trying to score preemptive hits first. In close quarters combat, where life-threatening situations emerge very quickly, sighted marksmanship techniques become risky, so advocates of point shooting emphasize a less sighting-oriented style that prioritizes the tactical advantages of quick fire superiority and suppression.

Point shooting is also a technique used by trained archers and marksmen to improve general accuracy when using a bow, crossbow, firearm or other ranged weapon. In addition, Instinct Combat Shooting is a method police are taught. By developing a muscle memory for a given weapon, the shooter can become so accustomed to the weapon's weight and balance in its typical shooting position as to remain relatively accurate without needing to focus on the sights to aim. With sustained practice, a shooter can develop a subconscious hand-eye coordination utilizing proprioceptive reflex, minimizing the concentration required for effective shooting. In archery it is called instinctive shooting and is considered a real philosophy.

== Overview ==
One point shooting method, referred to as aimed point shooting, has been used and discussed since the early 19th century. The method employs the use of the index finger along the side of the gun to aim the gun, and the middle finger is used to pull the trigger. Mention of the use of the middle finger can be found in books from the early 1800s up through the 20th century: 1804, 1810, 1816, 1829 1835, 1885, 1898, 1900, 1908, 1912, and in many other military manuals on the M1911 pistol.

The United States Army's first instructional manual on the use of the M1911 pistol specifically mentions it, but in a cautionary way due to the design of the slide stop: the slide stop pin protrudes from the right side of the pistol, and if depressed when the gun is fired, the M1911 can jam. Similar cautionary language is repeated in many other military manuals published from 1912 and up until the 1940s: 1915, 1917, 1918, 1920, 1921, 1922, 1926, 1927, 1929, and 1941.

Several US patents have drawings showing the method used with firearms: US Patent # 694969 issued Mar. 11, 1902, US Patent # 896099 issued Aug. 18, 1908, US Patent # 2270707 issued Jan. 20, 1942, US Patent # 5166459 issued Nov. 1992.

Early 20th century shooting experts such as William E. Fairbairn and Rex Applegate advocated point shooting, while many experts later in the century advocated the use of sights. Later sight-reliant methods include Jeff Cooper's modern technique method which became popular after World War II. The modern technique is also known as "sight-reliant shooting" or "sight shooting".

The issue of using sight-reliant shooting, which relies on the use of the sights for aiming in close-quarters combat situations, versus point shooting, which does not rely on the sights for aiming in close quarters combat situations, has been debated since as early as 1835.

== Basis for the use of aimed point shooting ==
Video showing aimed point shooting being used to shoot at and hit a string of aerials (soda cans tossed into the air at a distance of 3 meters (9.8 ft)

The one thing that point shooting methods have in common is that they do not rely on the sights, and they strive to increase the shooter's ability to hit targets at short range under the less-than-ideal conditions expected in close quarters, life-threatening situations, self-defense, and combat situations.

Aimed point shooting employs humans' ability to point accurately at targets in such a way, that the shooter can use that ability to hit targets with a firearm.

The following is from Chap. 2, Sect. II, US Army Field Manual 23-25, Combat Training With Pistols & Revolvers:

When a soldier points, he instinctively points at the feature on the object on which his eyes are focused. An impulse from the brain causes the arm and hand to stop when the finger reaches the proper position. When the eyes are shifted to a new object or feature, the finger, hand, and arm also shift to this point. It is this inherent trait that can be used by the soldier to rapidly and accurately engage targets.

Further the U.S. Marine Corps Warfighting Publication on Military Operations on Urbanized Terrain (MOUT) states:

Pointing Quick Fire. The pointing system is based on the phenomenon that when a person looks at an object and simultaneously points a finger at it, the finger aligns itself on the point of focus of the eyes with no conscious effort on the part of the individual. When a Marine looks at an object and simultaneously brings his rifle to his shoulder, the rifle in effect becomes an extension of the pointed finger. Consequently, it aligns itself naturally with the object on which the shooter is focusing.

Walter J. Dorfner SSgt VSP, the Vice Chair of the Use of Force Committee of the Vermont Criminal Justice Training Council at the Vermont Police Academy in Pittsford, Vermont, wrote a paper that details his experimentation with using that method of aiming and shooting. He also was the lead firearms instructor for the VSP.

== In military doctrine ==
Point shooting is often included in military tactical training, alongside other topics such as combatives and urban warfare. A variety of point shooting methods have entered military doctrine at various times and places.

=== Fairbairn, Sykes, and Applegate ===
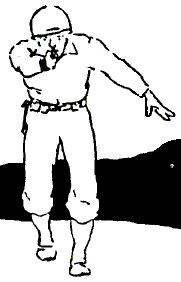
Front view of handgun point shooting position

Soon after the creation of the Office of Strategic Services (OSS) in 1942, then Second Lieutenant Rex Applegate was given the task of adapting the training being given to British Commando forces for use by OSS agents. Applegate's methodology was published in his book, Kill or Get Killed which was first printed in 1943, and based on his training program for the OSS developed with William E. Fairbairn and Eric A. Sykes. This method is often referred to as the Fairbairn, Sykes, and Applegate method, or FSA (though sometimes the order is altered to FAS).

By 1976, it was into its fifth edition, and was re-published in 1991 as Fleet Marine Force Reference Publication FM12-80, Kill or Get Killed. This book covers a wide range of topics, from armed and unarmed combat to prisoner control and riot control techniques. Chapter 5, "Combat Use of the Hand Gun", covers the basic use of a handgun in a combat situation, while chapter 6, "Combat Firing with Shoulder Weapons", covers techniques for submachine guns, rifles and shotguns. While aimed fire techniques are covered in both chapters, along with topics such as use of cover and different firing positions, the point shooting techniques generally attract the most attention. Much of Applegate's instruction on point shooting involves developing a firm, consistent shooting position that allows the student to consistently hit where he is looking.

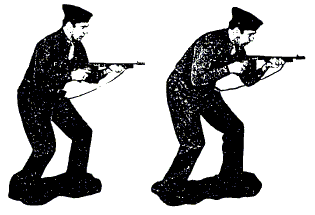
Side view of shoulder weapon point shooting position

While Applegate did cover firing handguns from the hip (from a position he called the "1/2 hip" position), he was careful to point out that this method only worked on targets at the same level as the shooter, and only at very close range.

For one hand shooting, the gun is held in a low ready position and on center of the body, and with the wrist and arm locked. The arm stays locked (stiff), as the pistol is then raised from the shoulder. And when on target, a convulsive squeeze is used to fire.

To reduce error in the stance, targets not directly in front of the shooter are engaged by turning the upper body at the hips, since turning the arm at the shoulder, elbow, or wrist will result in a loss of control and a miss, while turning at the waist keeps everything aligned correctly.

Another of Applegate's training innovations was the use of particularly intense combat firing ranges, which he called the "house of horrors". A cross between an obstacle course, a haunted house, and a shooting range, it used a three dimensional layout with stairs and tunnels, pop-up targets, deliberately poor lighting, psychologically disturbing sounds, simulated cobwebs and bodies, and blank cartridges being fired towards the shooter. The range was designed to have the greatest possible psychological impact on the shooter, to simulate the stress of combat as much as possible, and no targets were presented at distances of greater than 10 feet (3.0 m) from the shooter.

Applegate also used his house of horrors as a test of the point shooting training. Five hundred men with no previous handgun shooting experience were run through the house of horrors after standard, bullseye-type, introductory target pistol training with no gun handling instruction, and then again (with modifications in the layout) after training in Applegate's approach to point shooting and basic gun handling. The average number of hits in the first group was four out of twelve targets hit (with two shots per target). After point shooting, the average jumped to ten out of twelve targets hit. Further shooters trained only in point shooting, including those who had never fired a handgun before receiving point shooting training, maintained the high average established by the first group. Similar methods were in use as early as the 1920s and continue to this day, for example the FBI facility called Hogan's Alley.

=== Rifle Quick Kill ===
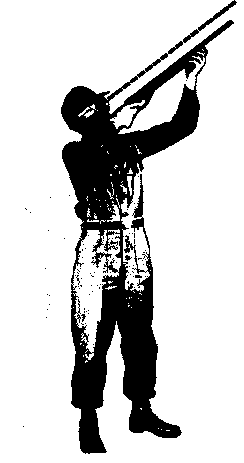
The proper method of sighting to hit aerial targets with the sightless BB gun

A method of point shooting with a rifle was developed by Lucky McDaniel and taught by the US Army beginning in 1967. It was called "Quick Kill", and it was taught using an air rifle. The Quick Kill method was fully detailed in-step-by-step fashion in Principles of Quick Kill. It was taught starting with a special Daisy BB gun that had no sights. The slow moving steel BB was visible in flight on sunny days, making it an inexpensive tracer round. The students began by firing at 3.5-inch (89 mm) diameter metal disks thrown in the air slightly in front of the student and 2 to 4 meters (6 ft 7 in to 13 ft 1 in) above the student's head. After an 80% hit rate is attained firing at these disks, the student is then presented with 2.5-inch (64 mm) diameter disks. Once proficiency is attained with the aerial targets, it shows the student has mastered the fundamentals, and training moves on to stationary targets on the ground, first with the BB gun and then with a service rifle having its front and rear sights taped over.

The reason the quick kill method works is that the shooter learns to sight above the barrel, rather than along the barrel. While focusing on the target, the muzzle is placed about 2 inches (51 mm) below the target (the distance being measured at the muzzle), which places the barrel nearly parallel to the line of sight of the shooter. To hit the aerial targets, or other targets above eye level, the shooter focuses on the top edge of the target. When shooting at targets on the ground or below eye level, the shooter focuses on the bottom of the target. One of the points emphasized in quick kill is that it is essential to focus on a single spot on the target, such as the top edge of a thrown disc, or the bottom edge of a can on the ground.

A key to hitting the target is for the shooter to track the target by moving their head with the rifle seated against it, instead of just following it with the eyes.

The Daisy company commercially sold sightless BB guns and target throwers for a number of years under the name Quick Skill, along with an instruction book that was a demilitarized version of the aerial target portion of the "quick kill" course.

=== Pistol Quick Kill ===
In the late 1990s and early 2000s, Robin Brown (a former student of Lucky McDaniel) popularized Pistol Quick Kill.

With Pistol Quick Kill, the pistol is gripped and pointed at a target much like a person would point their finger. "When you point, you naturally do not attempt to sight or aim your finger. It will be somewhat below your eye level in your peripheral vision, perhaps 2-4 inches below eye level."

The same applies when pointing a gun at a target. Just as with pointing their finger, the user will "...see the end of the barrel and/or front sight while looking at the target...You have not looked at the gun or front sight, just the target."

"With Quick Kill, the focus is always on the target, never having to adjust one's gaze or focus even remotely on the near object [the gun or sights]."

=== Quick fire ===
Quick fire is a method previously used by the US Army for teaching point shooting. It is described in the following excerpt from US Army Field Manual FM 3-22.9:

Aimed. When presented with a target, the soldier brings the rifle up to his shoulder and quickly fires a single shot. His firing eye looks through or just over the rear sight aperture. He uses the front sight post to aim at the target. Using this technique, a target at 25 meters or less may be accurately engaged in one second or less.

Pointed. When presented with a target, the soldier keeps the rifle at his side and quickly fires a single shot or burst. He keeps both eyes open and uses his instinct and peripheral vision to line up the rifle with the target. Using this technique, a target at 15 meters or less may be engaged in less than one second.

=== Reflexive fire ===
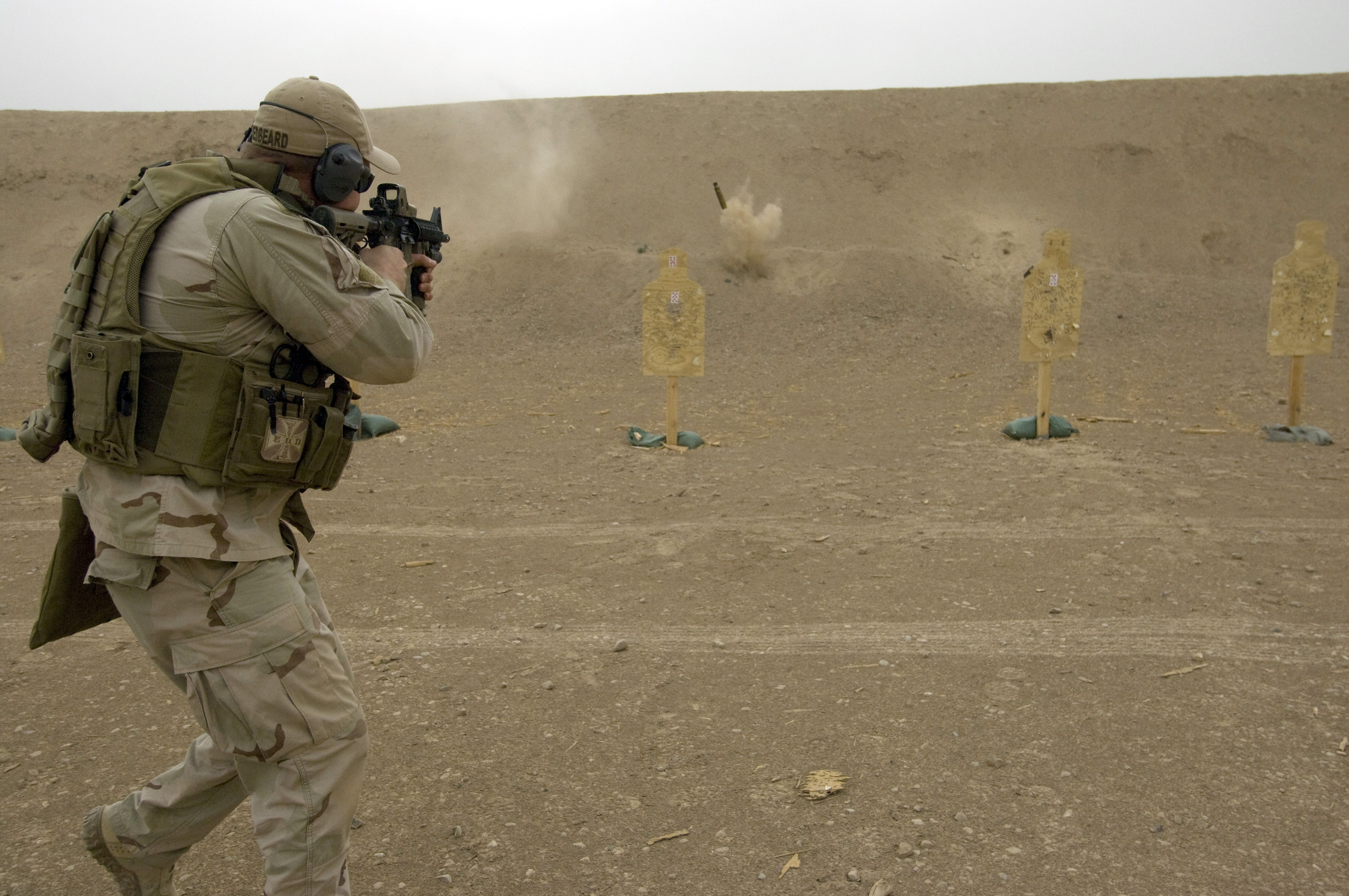
US Navy sailor practices reflexive firing during a periodic weapons assessment

Reflexive fire is a method currently used by the US Army to teach short-range marksmanship with a rifle or carbine, but it is considered to be the least accurate of the techniques taught.

=== Israeli method ===
The "Israeli method" is a point shooting system devised by the Israel Defense Forces for use in training personnel to use rifles, submachine guns, and handguns.

In its initial stages of training, it closely resembles the FSA method. In later stages, training in the rapid acquisition of the sights is taught, as well as a more advanced method of point shooting.

== In law enforcement ==
Instinct shooting, referred to as "Quick Kill", was taught to the U.S. Army using rifles by Lucky McDaniel as far back as the 1960s. McDaniel also taught his point shooting techniques to the police, but using BB guns.

Point firing, or instinctive shooting, with rifles developed as a result of direct combat experiences. It is taught by the Israeli, British and French militaries. Instinct shooting with a handgun has been taught at most police academies worldwide since the 1980s.

Point firing is similar to Quick Kill, with the sights not being used. The target is usually in close range, between 1–21 feet, in a life-or-death situation. Chuck Klein defines instinctive combat shooting as "the act of operating a handgun by focusing on the target and instinctively coordinating the hand and mind to cause the handgun to discharge at a time and point that ensures interception of the target with the projectile." The shooter should focus on a small point, like a button, stain or corner, not the attacker or target in general. This intense focus is tunnel-vision, which is widely discouraged, but is mandatory for the brief moment when the shooter transitions from deciding to shoot to the completion of shooting. Additional threats and innocents who may be hurt are scanned before the decision to shoot is made, and can be seen in peripheral vision. Between the point at which one decides to shoot and completion of the shot(s), full concentration, oblivious to everything else, is required. The time in which the shooter is engaged in tunnel vision only lasts a matter of milliseconds. Race car driver Phil Hill says, "True concentration is not aware of itself." There are no rigid requirements for positioning the body, feet or arms, as the practical use of this technique requires the shooter to be able to shoot from any position, though it is recommended that the shooter practice the technique using common target shooting stances.

== See also ==
- Glossary of firearms terms
