= Close-quarters battle =

Physical combat at close range

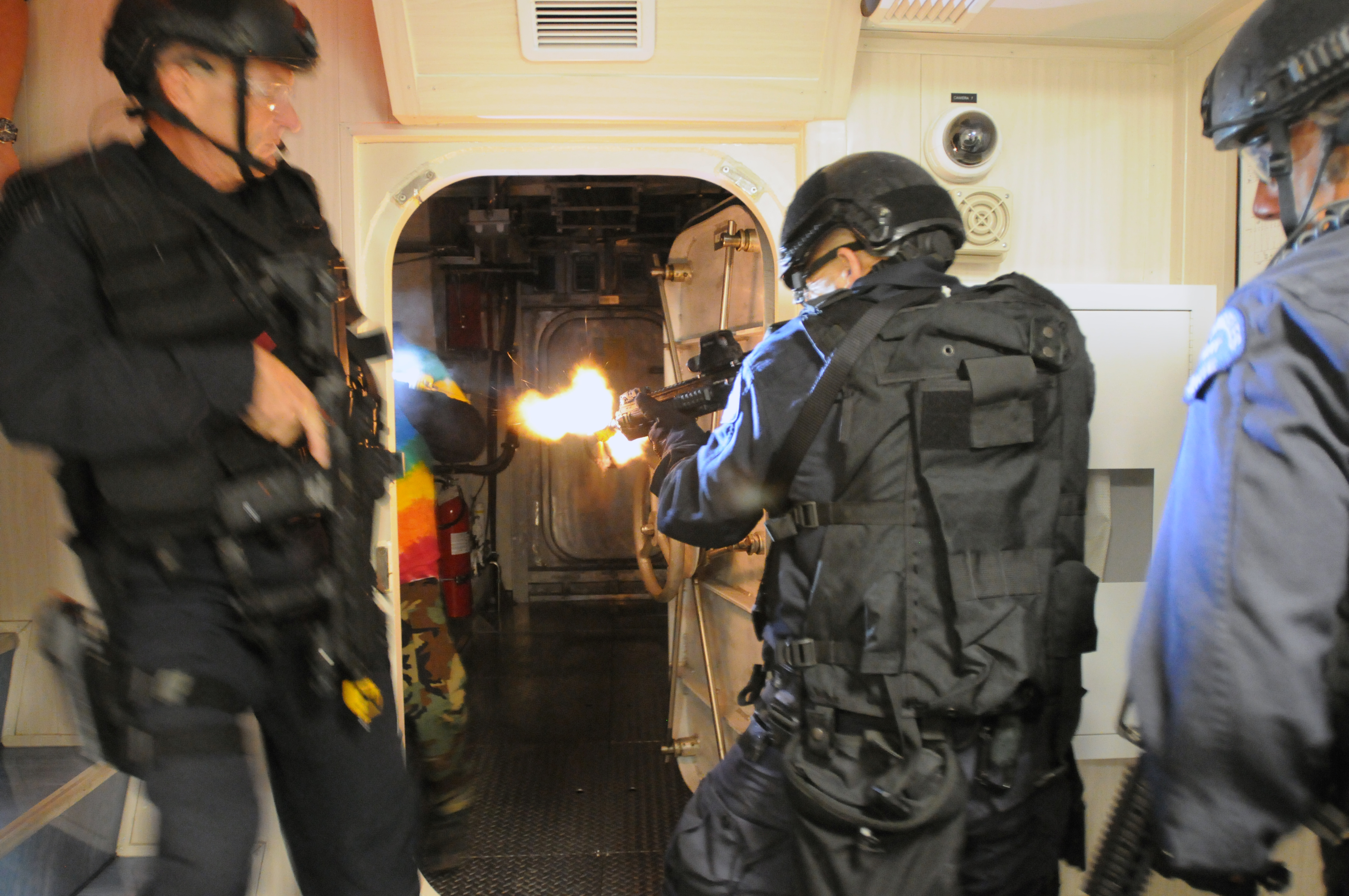
Los Angeles Police Department SWAT officers engaged in close-quarters battle during a joint training exercise with the U.S. Navy, 2007

Close-quarters battle (CQB), also called close-quarters combat (CQC), is a close combat situation between multiple combatants involving ranged (typically firearm-based) or melee combat. It can occur between military units, law enforcement and criminal elements, and in other similar situations. CQB is typically defined as a short duration, high intensity conflict characterized by sudden violence at close range.

== History ==
Close-quarters battle has occurred since the beginning of warfare, in the form of melee combat, the use of ranged weaponry (such as slings, bows, and muskets) at close range, and the necessity of bayonets. During World War I, CQB was a significant part of trench warfare, where enemy soldiers would fight in close and narrow quarters in attempts to capture trenches.

The origins of modern close-quarters battle lie in the combat methods pioneered by Assistant Commissioner William E. Fairbairn of the Shanghai Municipal Police, the police force of the Shanghai International Settlement (1854–1943). After the 1925 May Thirtieth Movement, Fairbairn was tasked with developing a dedicated auxiliary squad for riot control and aggressive policing. After absorbing the most appropriate elements from a variety of martial arts experts, Fairbairn condensed these arts into a martial art he called "defendu". The aim of defendu was to be as brutally effective as possible, while also being relatively easy for recruits and trainees to learn compared to other martial arts. The method incorporated both less-lethal and lethal fighting tactics, such as point shooting, firearm combat techniques, and the use of more ad hoc weapons such as chairs or table legs.

During World War II, Fairbairn was recruited to train Allied special forces in defendu. During this period, he expanded defendu's lethality for military purposes, calling it the "Silent Killing Close Quarters Combat method"; this became standard combat training for British special forces. He also published a textbook for CQB training called Get Tough. U.S. Army officers Rex Applegate and Anthony Biddle were taught Fairbairn's methods at a training facility in Scotland, and adopted the program for the training of Allied operatives at Camp X in Ontario, Canada. Applegate published his work in 1943, called Kill or Get Killed. During the war, training was provided to British Commandos, the First Special Service Force, OSS operatives, U.S. Army Rangers, and Marine Raiders. Other military martial arts were later introduced elsewhere, including European Unifight, Chinese sanshou, Soviet sambo, and the Israeli kapap and Krav Maga.

For a lengthy period following World War II, urban warfare and CQB had barely changed in infantry tactics. Modern firearm CQB tactics were developed in the 1970s as "close-quarters battle" by Western counterterrorist special forces units following the 1972 Munich massacre. The units trained in the aftermath of the massacre, such as the Special Air Service, Delta Force, GSG 9, GIGN, and Joint Task Force 2, developed CQB tactics involving firearms to quickly and precisely assault structures while minimizing friendly and hostage casualties; these CQB tactics were shared between these special forces units, who were closely-knit and frequently trained together. The Special Air Service used CQB tactics during the 1980 Iranian Embassy siege. CQB tactics soon reached police tactical units and similar paramilitaries, such as American SWAT teams, by the 1980s and 1990s.

However, CQB was still not widely taught to regular infantry, as it was considered a hostage rescue tactic. As late as the 1990s, some infantry manuals on urban combat described close-quarters room clearing essentially the same basic way it was described 60 years prior: a grenade being thrown into an enclosed area, followed by an infantry assault with automatic fire. The special forces "monopoly" on CQB was broken following the experiences of urban warfare and close-quarters battles in the 1990s, during the Battle of Mogadishu, the Bosnian War, and the First Chechen War.

The First and Second Battles of Fallujah during the Iraq War were the watershed moments for infantry CQB, when U.S. Marines, under pressure to capture the city of Fallujah, Iraq from insurgents, used conventional combined arms and fire support against the city, and lacked proper CQB training and equipment to effectively clear buildings, causing numerous civilian and allied casualties and severely damaging the city. With similar struggles in towns and cities among ABCA Armies during the War in Afghanistan, a proper approach to infantry in urban warfare became crucial, and CQB tactics began to be more widely taught to infantry.

According to scholar Anthony King, some special forces units express disdain at regular infantry being taught CQB, especially in organizational politics and internal matters such as securing budgets; a unit with CQB training requires expensive equipment and training facilities, using up funding that could be used for other units or purposes.

== Examples ==
- The Battle of Spotsylvania Court House took place between 9 and 21 May 1864 during the American Civil War. The men of the Northern and Southern armies were periodically forced into a bloody hand-to-hand struggle reminiscent of ancient battles, with the men using swords, knives, bayonets, and even with sticks and bare hands.
- The Battle of Isandlwana on 22 January 1879, the first battle in the Anglo-Zulu War, turned into close combat when the British exhausted their ammunition. It resulted in a decisive victory for Zulus over the modern British army.
- On 22 October 1986, during the Pudu Prison siege, the Special Actions Unit (special ops unit of the Royal Malaysia Police) turned to hand-to-hand combat, using batons and rattan canes, after the Malaysian Prime Minister ordered the resolution of the hostage crisis without the use of firearms. The result was a victory for the police, and the five prisoners holding hostages in Pudu Prison were arrested.
- The Battle of Danny Boy took place close to the city of Amarah in southern Iraq on 14 May 2004, between British soldiers and about 100 Iraqi insurgents of the Mahdi Army. The insurgents ambushed a patrol of Argyll and Sutherland Highlanders close to a checkpoint known as Danny Boy near Majar al-Kabir. The Argylls called in reinforcements from the 1st Battalion of the Princess of Wales's Royal Regiment; the latter were also ambushed, and due to an electronic communications failure, it was some time before further British relief arrived. While waiting for reinforcements, the British were involved in one of the fiercest engagements they fought in Iraq. The fighting involved close-quarter rifle fire and bayonets. The battle lasted for about three hours, during which 28 Mahdi Army insurgents were killed; the British suffered some wounded, but none were killed in the action.

== Use ==
=== Military ===
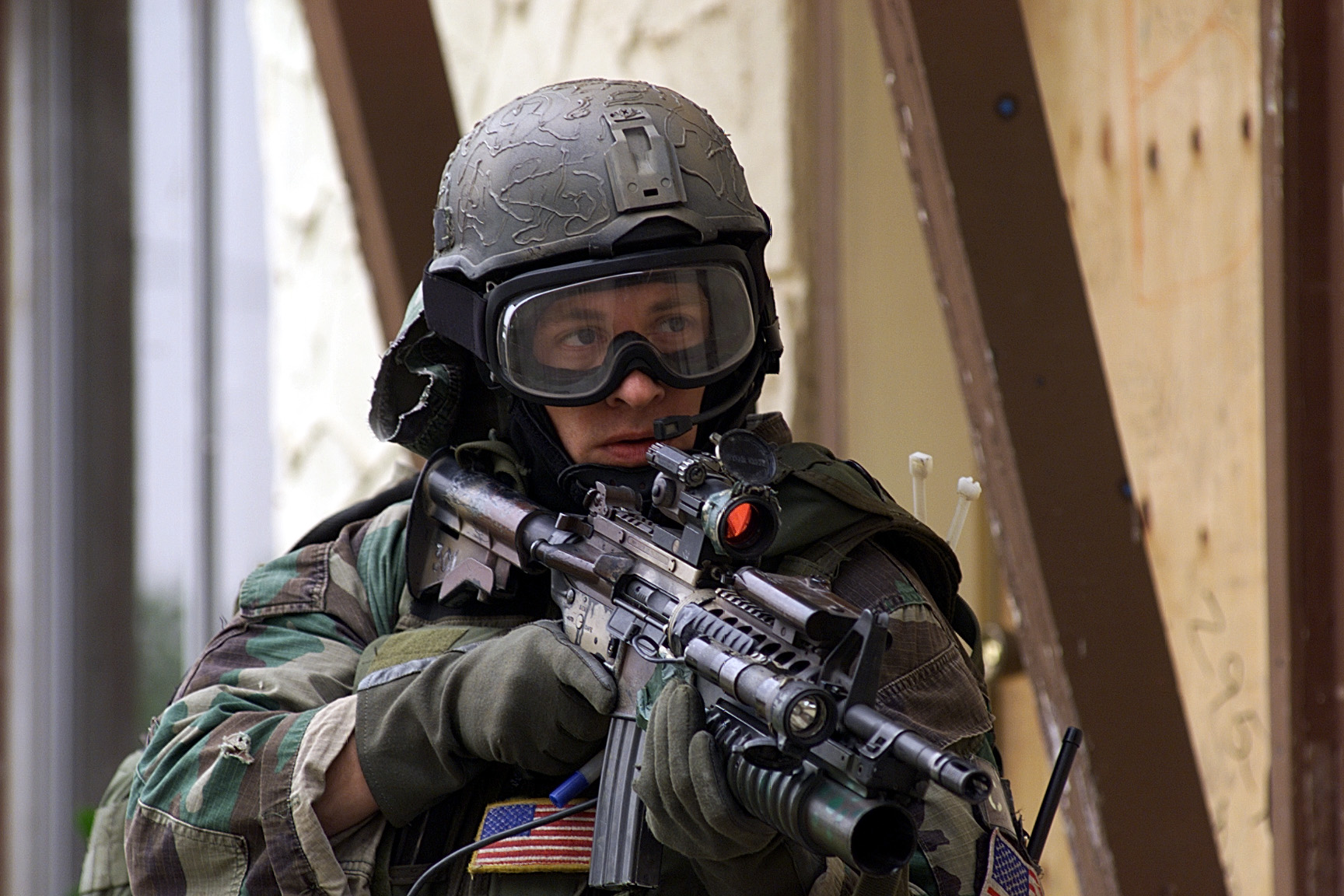
A U.S. Army Special Forces soldier preparing to breach a structure during training

Military uses of close-quarters battle vary by unit type, branch, and mission. Military operations other than war (MOOTW) may involve peacekeeping or riot control. Specialized forces may adapt MOUT tactics to their own needs, such as marine naval boarding teams being trained specifically to search ships and fight CQB within them. Hostage rescue or extraction units may involve even more esoteric adaptations or variations, depending on environments, weapons technology, political considerations, or personnel.

Armies that often engage in urban warfare operations may train most of their infantry in basic CQB doctrine as it relates to common tasks such as building entry, clearing a room, and using different types of grenades.

=== Police and law enforcement ===
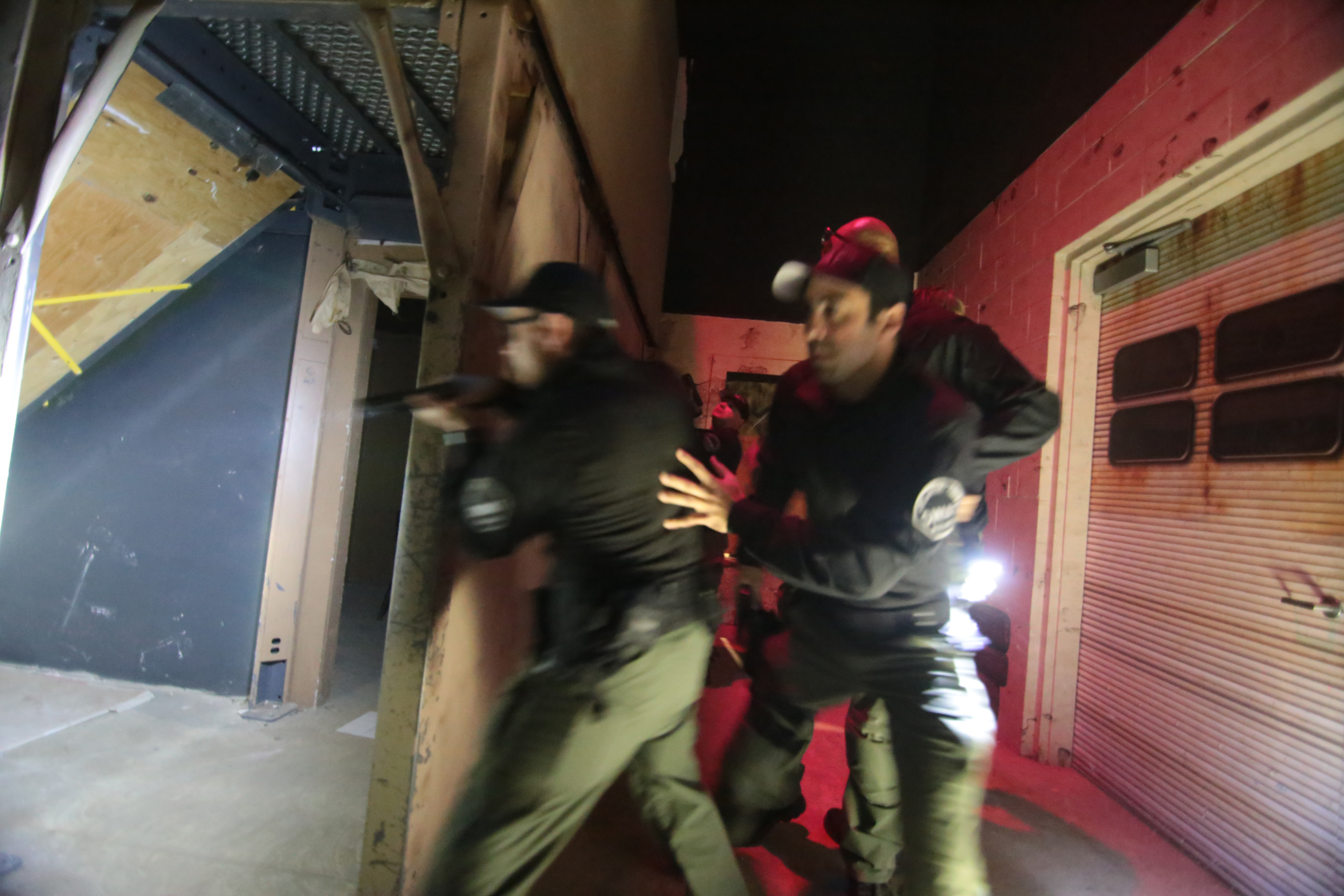
Atlantic City Police Department SWAT officers conducting CQB training

Police tactical units (PTU) are the primary units that engage in CQB domestically. Situations involving the potential for CQB generally involve threats outside of conventional police capabilities, and thus PTUs are trained, equipped, and organized to handle these situations. Additionally, police action is often within what can be considered "close quarters", so members of PTUs are often well-trained in or already experienced with CQB, to the point that some PTUs may train military service members in CQB principles such as breaching and room clearing.

Police CQB doctrine is often specialized by unit type and mission. Depending on the unit or agency's jurisdiction or scope, PTUs may have different goals with different tactics and technology; for example, prison guards may maintain a unit trained in CQB in compact indoors areas such as cells without using lethal force, while a police anti-gang unit may be trained in CQB against multiple enemies that may be difficult to identify.

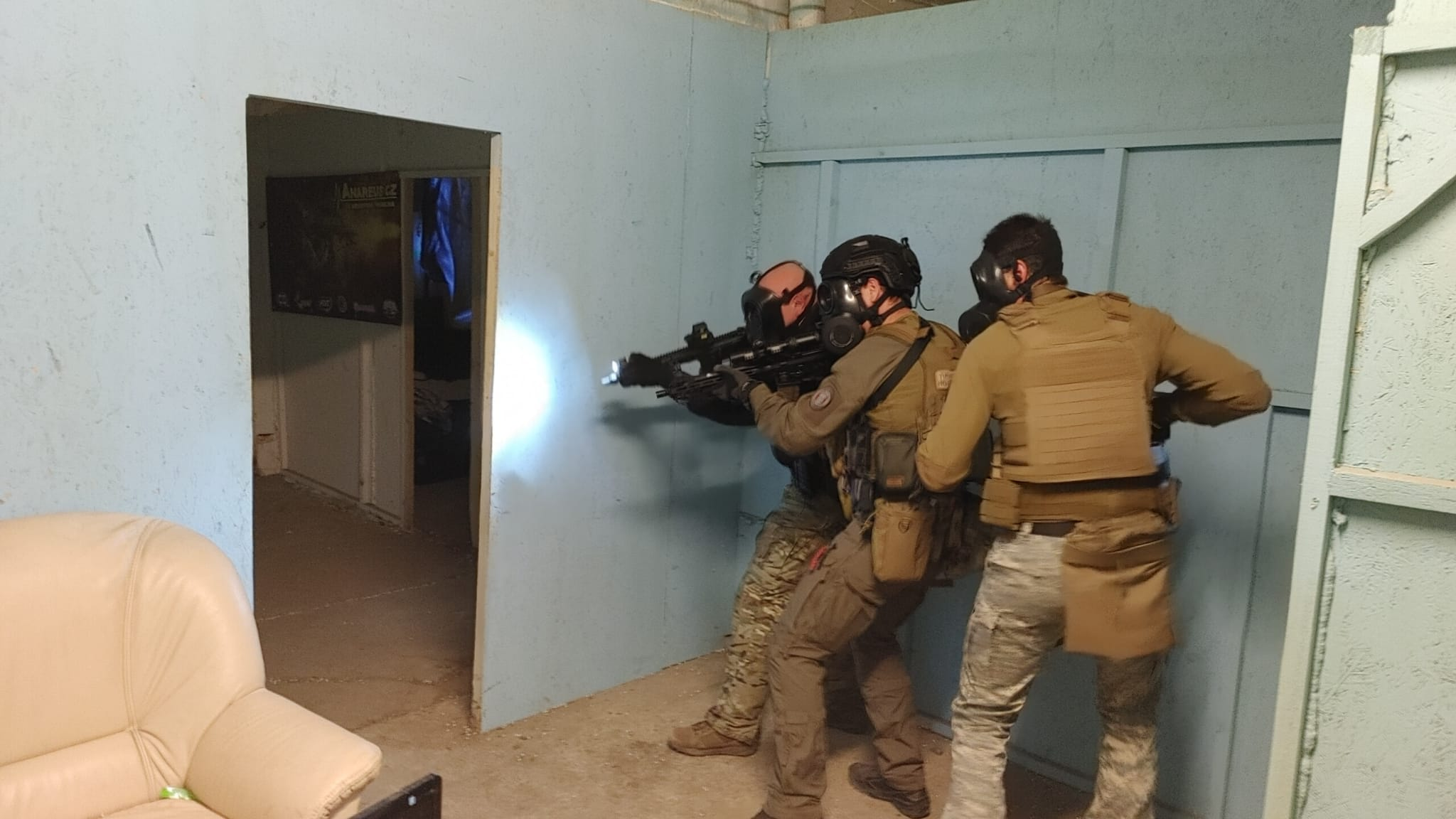
Czech Designated Reserves (armed civilians) training CQB elimination of active shooter

Unlike their military counterparts, PTUs, as law enforcement officers, are tasked with ideally apprehending suspects alive; for this reason, they are often trained in arrest procedures, non-lethal takedowns, and standoff negotiation instead of solely combat. They may be equipped with less-lethal weaponry such as tasers, pepper spray, and riot guns to fire tear gas, rubber bullets, plastic bullets, or beanbag rounds.

=== Private industry ===
Private security and private military companies may maintain units that are trained in CQB. These teams may be responsible for responding to an incident at a facility operated by a government agency that has hired their security services, or to provide protection for VIPs in combat zones. For instance, the U.S. Department of State employed such security teams in Iraq.

Private military and security companies known to maintain units that are trained in, or are capable of training other units in, CQB include Blackwater and SCG International Risk.

== See also ==
- List of established military terms
- Hand-to-hand combat
- Kill house
- Knife fight
- Mozambique drill
- Charge (warfare)
- Combatives
