= Criminal justice ethics =

Criminal justice ethics (also police ethics) is the academic study of ethics as it is applied in the area of law enforcement. Usually, a course in ethics is required of candidates for hiring as law enforcement officials. These courses focus on subject matter which is primarily guided by the needs of social institutions and societal values. Law enforcement agencies operate according to established police practices and ethical guidelines consistent with community standards in order to maintain public trust while performing their responsibilities.

Police ethics and integrity are essential aspects of the law enforcement system that facilitate effective crime control practices. A combination of laws, training, and standards help police officers maintain ethical behavior on duty. Holding a position of authority while also having the means to use force legitimately requires police professionals to adhere to the strictest ethical standards to avoid controversial or corrupt abuses of power.

Policing the community often brings ethical situations into consideration that may be, but is not limited to, one of the following circumstances: criminal investigations, procedural justice, racial profiling, early intervention systems, internal affairs, citizen complaints, mediation, recruitment, and use of force.

== Values ==
Values are the ideas and behaviors that shape ethical ideals. Personal values are things that are important to individuals that are shaped by one's specific upbringing, religious beliefs, cultural background, and personal experiences. Societal values are things that are comprehensively held by a broader number of people, like a community, that align closely to the society's culture and beliefs. Personal values are unique to individuals and thus are not an appropriate basis for professional ethics. Ethics can be defined as a system of moral values that distinguish rules for behavior based on an individual's or groups' ideas of what is good and bad. Police ethics are the rules for behavior that guide law enforcement officials based on what society deems as right and wrong. Ethics remain constant while definitions of right and wrong may change over time, yet what may be considered ethically right or wrong can be different than what is legally considered right and wrong. For police officials, ethical standards further include values such as integrity, courage and allegiance.

== Code of ethics ==
Law enforcement officials are expected to comply with a code of ethics outlining general guidelines to ethical behavior of police professionals. To be effective, the code of ethics should become part of each officer’s demeanor and officers should learn to live and think ethically in order to avoid conflicting behaviors.

Codes of ethics are used as instructional aids for law enforcement departments to help officers define standards and expectations of behavior. Some countries adopt or draft a national code of ethics that all law enforcement officials are expected to abide by and other countries allow for individual police departments to adopt their own code. For example, the United Kingdom adopted a national code of ethics in April 2014, while in the United States, most police departments adopt the code of ethics (adopted) by the International Association of Chiefs of Police, though they are not required to.

The Code of Ethics was developed and written by Captain Gene Muehleisen of San Diego PD as chairman of the Professional Committee of the Peace Officers Research Association of California (PORAC).

The failure by police professionals to act ethically could result in the loss of public trust, jeopardize investigations, or expose agencies or departments to liability issues.

=== International Association of Chiefs of Police ===
The International Association of Chiefs of Police (IACP) has over 14,000 members and operates in 68 countries, making it the most universally representative police association. The IACP emphasizes the importance and need of ethics training in law enforcement agencies. The organization developed a subcommittee for ethics training in 1995 that later released multiple recommendations to all of its members. The recommendations include encouraging the adoption and support of a law enforcement oath of honor, providing job-specific ethics training, and constantly reinforcing ethical conduct throughout the agency and during recruitment.

Incorporated in the IACP’s rules is a code of ethics outlining standards of professional conduct. The first five sections of the code of ethics are the basic tenets that all IACP members should uphold. Sections six through fourteen outline ethical standards concerning enforcement procedures.

== Aspects of police ethics training ==
Police officers routinely face complicated situations that involve strong emotions and volatile circumstances. Ethics training can help prepare officers and police professionals for unpredictable situations and how to react ethically. Training can include ethical guidance such as:

- Quickly recognize ethical issue or problem
- Identify options and alternatives to address the problem
- Make rational and ethical decisions
- Promptly respond with actions based on the ethical decisions made to solve the issue or problem
- Accept the responsibility of the outcomes in the situation

Law enforcement officials must both think and act ethically. A response to any particular situation has two factors, the reaction and action. The reaction is an emotional response and the action refers to how a police professional handles the situation. Ethics training emphasizes the importance of responding with actions that are not just abiding the law but also take motivation into consideration. Actions that involve an officer doing the right thing for the wrong reason is not considered acting ethically.

The United States Department of Justice released a report in 2009 titled "Building Trust Between the Police and the Citizens They Serve" which outlines the ways in which ethical training can help create and maintain trust between a community and the professionals policing it. One aspect of training is having the chief of police establish, exhibit, and promote ethical conduct and fairness both inside and outside the agency. Aside from establishing an ethical culture, ethical training should begin with new police professionals and extend throughout their career until they retire.

== In the United States ==
The United States has various laws and policies in place, such as the Miranda Rights, that are meant to ensure ethical practices by law enforcement officials. Further measures have been adopted to secure ethical standards in police departments. Such measures include various codes of ethics provided by professional law enforcement associations like the Law Enforcement Code of Ethics, adopted in 1957, and the American Federation of Police, adopted in 1966. The Law Enforcement Code of Ethics was revised in 1989 by the International Association of Chiefs of Police. The U.S. does not have a national code of ethics, rather individual police departments construct their own code of ethics based upon the basic standards laid out in the law enforcement associations that are then incorporated into an oath of office each member of the department pledges.

== See also ==
- Criminal justice
- Peelian principles
- Police
- Police oath
- Police academy
- Police misconduct
