= Lucky McDaniel =

American sport shooter

Bobby Lamar "Lucky" McDaniel (1925–1986) was an American marksmanship instructor, who taught what he called "instinct shooting" to bird hunters and law enforcement officers off and on from 1953 until 1982, using a Daisy lever-action BB gun without sights as his basic training aid. He taught approximately 100,000 people how to shoot, including President Dwight D. Eisenhower, Henry Ford II, John Wayne, Audie Murphy, and key executives of the Remington and Winchester firearms companies.

From 1967 to 1973, McDaniel was an instructor for the U.S. Army, where he instructed infantrymen in instinctive shooting with the service rifle in jungle or urban warfare. The Army employed his training course for some years under the program name, "Quick Kill". Beginning in the late 1970s, McDaniel taught combat shooting at Mitchell WerBell III's facility, "The Farm", located in Powder Springs, Georgia, where a number of Israelis, among others, were trained.

== Biography ==
During his childhood, McDaniel honed his hand-eye coordination by spending his summers at his grandparents' farm in Middle Georgia in the 1930s, often hunting for dinner for the family with a .22 rifle and a .410 shotgun. As a teenage pool hustler in Warner Robins, Georgia, he earned the nickname "Lucky". Later, McDaniel became a route man for the U.S. Tobacco Company, moving stocks of Brown's Mule chewing tobacco, Brewton's Dental snuff, and Sano cigarettes to crossroads country-stores in rural Georgia.

In 1954, McDaniel began teaching instinctive shooting full-time. His training courses for bird hunters and police officers lasted about four hours. Initially, McDaniel taught the basics of instinct shooting to both of these groups using the cheapest 400-shot Daisy lever-action air rifle available, with the sights removed, as its relatively weak spring propelled the BB through the air slowly, making it easier for the student to track the flight of the BB. Daisy later built a BB rifle to McDaniel's specifications.

== Shooting technique ==
Two books, Instinct Shooting and Lucky McDaniel's Secrets to Shooting, are devoted to McDaniel's training techniques, which were considered highly unconventional. He was written about in a wide variety of magazines, particularly in the 1950s, including Time, Saturday Evening Post, Sports Illustrated and Guns. McDaniel had intuited effective procedures for training the subconscious mind to direct the body to perform manual tasks, in this case, shooting to hit certain types of targets, more rapidly and with greater precision than could be attained by the conscious mind. In the 1950s, however, kinesiology, specifically, proprioception and proprioceptive feedback, and cognitive ergonomics to speed the development of procedural memory were not well understood, and his approach went mostly unnoticed outside of a small segment of the shooting community.

McDaniel's primary contributions to instinct-shooting instruction were twofold. First, after analyzing, via time-and-motion studies, all of the moves involved in shouldering, pointing, and firing the rifle or shotgun instinctively, or in quick-drawing and hip-shooting the handgun, McDaniel minimized the number of moves required to point and fire the gun at the target; and, at the same time, minimized the number of joints in the body left mobile (i.e., the variables), which the subconscious mind would have to control in order to direct the muscles of the body to point and shoot the gun accurately. Secondly, he developed an effective training program of motor learning to teach the student's subconscious mind how to quickly solve all of the guidance-and-control problems involved, and how to use those solutions to direct the relevant muscles to point and fire the gun, so as to hit the target without conscious thought on the part of the shooter, except to select the target and initiate the process. The key factor was the use of feedback to correct for positioning errors, by directing the student to always try to bracket the target with the next shot, rather than attempt to hit it directly. This was the fast track for training the subconscious mind to attain a high degree of accuracy in a short time. In his 1980 book, McDaniel called that key factor "proprioceptive feedback".
