= Tamiya TT-01 =

The TT-01 is a 1/10 scale shaft-driven R/C chassis made by Tamiya. Since its release in 2003, the TT-01 has been used as an entry-level chassis, especially for drifting and rallying applications. The TT-01 features a bathtub-style chassis frame and a central driveshaft. The motor and battery are positioned in cut-out mounting locations to lower the center of gravity. The TT-01 is used in 24-hour endurance racing events in Europe and the United States. These events see teams of competitors, hobbyists, and friends build their TT-01 kit at the track the morning of the race then compete for 24 hours with teams of 5-8 people just like the races at Lemans and Daytona. Several TT-01 kits include LED head and tail lights for use during night racing.

== Versions ==
- TT-01 - The first Tamiya TT-01 was released as a Ferrari Enzo in 2003. The original version features a 27T 540 "silver-can" motor, open planetary differentials front and rear, and non-adjustable double wishbone suspension with dry friction shock absorbers.
- TT-01D (Drift) - Includes low friction, hard plastic "drift" tires, ball bearings, adjustable suspension arms, oil-filled shock absorbers and a Sport Tuned 25T Mabuchi Motor. It also comes with body shells of typical real-life drift cars like the Mazda FD3S RX-7, Nissan Silvia S15 Nismo Coppermix and Toyota Supra, and the kits include LED lights.
- TT-01R (Race) - Adds aluminum alloy drive shaft, adjustable rear toe-in and a Tamiya 25T "GT tuned" motor. The race kit does not come with a lexan body shell.
- TT-01 Type E (Enhanced) - The TT-01 Type E features polycarbonate suspension uprights and fiberglass-reinforced nylon chassis bracing. For more information on the updated parts check this information from tamiya: TT-01 vs. TT0-1 Type E By Andrew Kuntze
- TT-01D Type E - Combines "D" upgraded parts with "E" upgraded materials.
- TT-01R Type E - Combines "R" upgraded parts with "E" upgraded materials. Also adds metal diff cup joints, dog bones and wheel axles.
- TT-01S Type E (TT-01 Type E Sport) - XB Series/RTR-only version of the TT-01 Type E kit. Uses cheaper materials to achieve lower retail price.

== Expert built ==
Tamiya also sells the TT-01, TT-01D and TT-01 Type E in Ready-to-Run (RTR) versions, designated "XB" or "Expert built". These come with pre-painted body shells, transmitters and receivers, and only needs batteries and a charger to get the model going.

Depending on your country XB System RTR kits are also available. These ship with a simple wall plug charger and a standard size 7.2V 1800mah NiMH battery.

Tamiya TT-01D

== 24 Hours of Andernach (Germany) ==
The 24 Hours of Andernach (24h Rennen Andernach in German) is an endurance RC race that takes place once a year at the Andernach Autodrom in Germany. Uwe Rheinard, co-creator of the Euro Touring Series and father of Marc, four times IFMAR World Champion driver, started his annual 24-hour endurance-race event originally using Tamiya FWD kits. Since its introduction, the TT01 kit has been utilized. The 24 Hours of Andernach is an RC endurance race; similar events in other regions have adopted its format. All teams utilize a Porsche 911 body. Since the event is held outdoors, the teams must be prepared for rain just like the real thing, because they do not stop the race for weather. In 2012, 4000 mAh LiPo batteries were introduced for the event. Rules allow a maximum of five battery packs. With 3482 laps, or 630 km, team ‘Wilde 13′ won for the fourth time in row with their Falken-Porsche using only two sets of tires and without a single parts failure.

== 24 Hours of Jackson (USA) ==
Inspired by Andernach, RC racers in the US caught onto the fun of endurance racing with the TT-01, most notably with the creation of the 24 Hours of Jackson held in Jackson, New Jersey. The race is promoted courtesy of the Jackson RC club, who are also known for hosting the 2011 ROAR National RC Championships. They held their 1st annual event in 2010 with great success seeing almost all teams finish the race. The facility is also an outdoor, curbed, euro-style track which is ideal for endurance racing as it cuts down on marshal needs which adds up over 24 hours. Many teams will find a motor change needed at some point in the race which again makes the TT-01 an ideal platform with its shaft drive making the change quick and painless. The race allows teams of 5-8 people and, unlike Andernach, the ability to choose their body of choice from 6-8 available selections that are in stock from Tamiya. Jackson also came to the decision in keeping the track layout the same for this particular race so subsequent years could attempt to break the distance record. This was to be the case with the winning team in 2010 covering 3963 laps only to be broken by the 2011 winner who managed 4118 laps total.

== See also ==
- Tamiya DF-02
