= Ruger M77 =

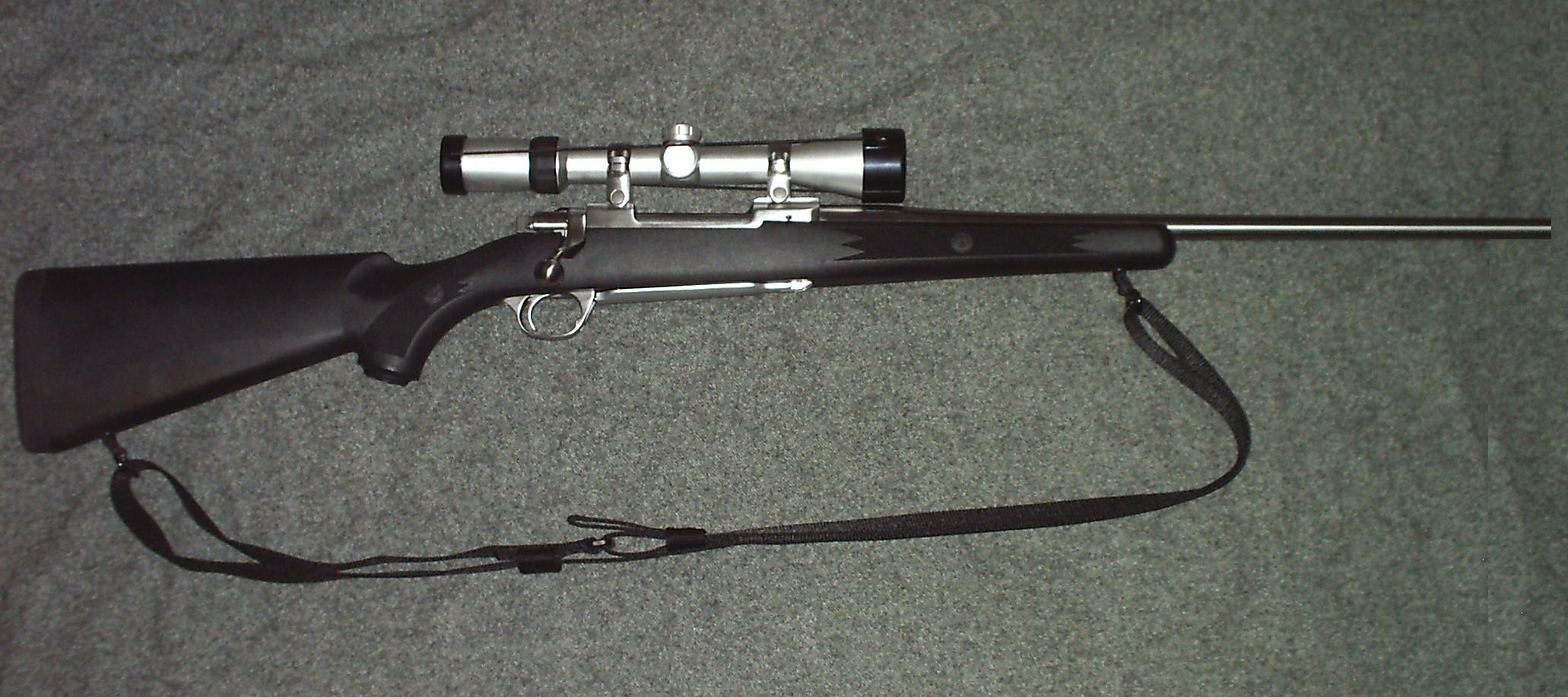
- M77 Mk II in .270 Winchester
- Type: Rifle
- Place of origin: United States

Production history
- Designer: L. James Sullivan
- Designed: 1968
- Manufacturer: Sturm, Ruger & Co.
- Produced: 1968-1984 (Tang Safety, Push Feed); 1985-1992 (Transitional Model); 1989- (Mk II, Controlled Feed)
- Variants: See Variants

Specifications (Ruger M77 Standard)
- Mass: 6.75–8.25 pounds (3.06–3.74 kg)
- Length: 42–44.75 inches (106.7–113.7 cm)
- Barrel length: 22–24 inches (56–61 cm)
- Cartridge: Various
- Action: Bolt-action
- Feed system: 3-5 round integral box magazine
- Sights: Various

The Ruger M77 is a bolt-action rifle produced by Sturm, Ruger & Co. It was designed by Jim Sullivan during his three years with Ruger. It was designed primarily as a hunting rifle featuring a traditional Mauser K98-style two-lugged bolt with a claw extractor.

== History ==
Ruger's first bolt action rifle was introduced to the U.S. market back in 1968 after some years of design and innovation led by Jim Sullivan and influenced Bill Ruger himself, who hired Sullivan in 1965 primarily to develop the rifle.

Investment casting was used to save on costs. The M77's popularity rose fast due to features such as the Mauser type claw extractor that filled a gap in the market that occurred in 1964 when Winchester discontinued the controlled round feed version of the Model 70 in order to compete with the recently introduced Remington 700, as well as for the writings of the late Jack O'Connor favoring the rifle.

== Design and features ==
From the beginning, the M77 was intended as a modernized Mauser 98, though numerous changes were made. Bill Ruger wanted to use investment casting in place of a forged receiver. The Sullivan-designed bolt dispensed with the Mauser blade type ejector and instead used the simpler plunger style of ejector. A two-position tang safety and redesigned trigger system were also designed from scratch, while the stock design was carried out with the aid of the famous stock designer Lenard Brownell.

The M77 uses an angled screw that draws the action down and to the rear, tightly bedding it against the stock.

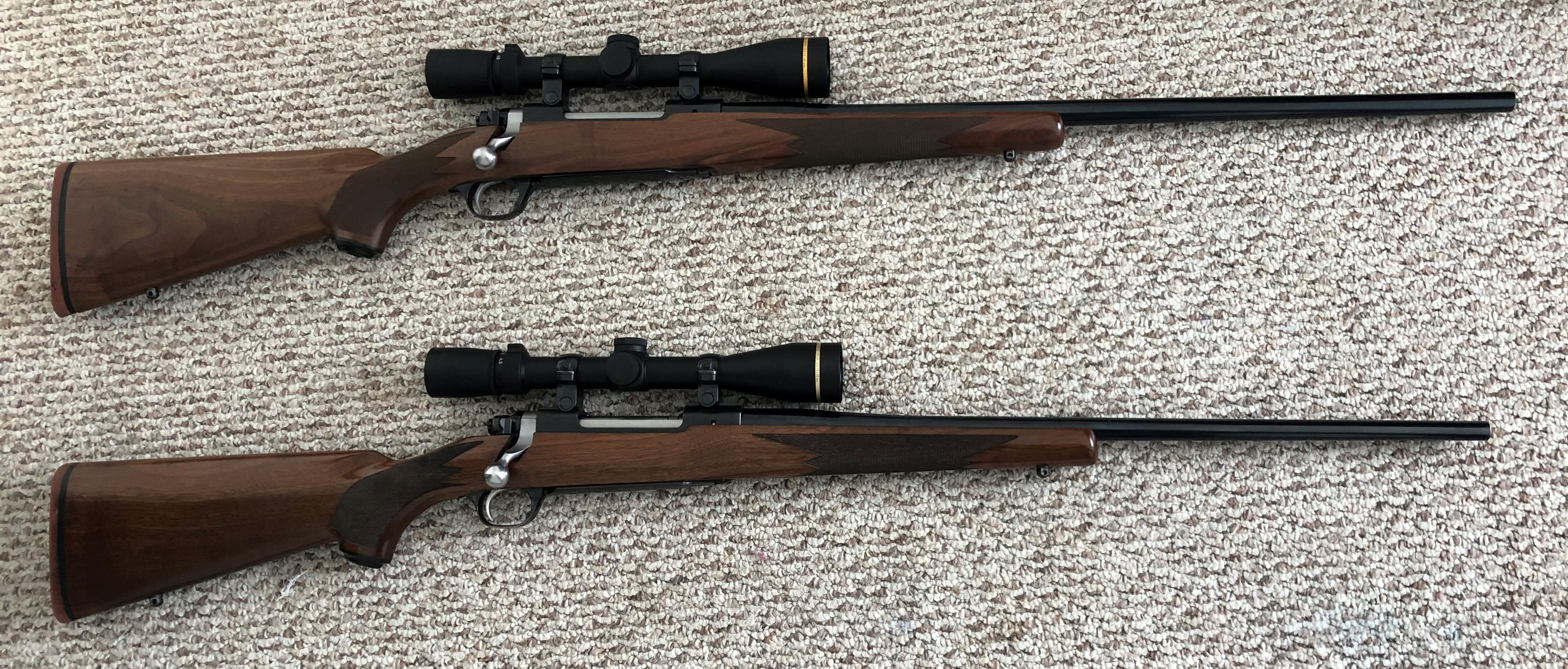
M77 Hawkeye rifles chambered in .300 Win Mag and .270 Win

== Variants ==
The M77 has undergone several redesigns.

=== M77 tang safety ===
The original model was not a true controlled round feed action but a push feed with an external claw and included a tang safety. Barrels fitted to these first M77s were provided by third parties, thus resulting in accuracy variation among rifles. The first change involved incorporating a proprietary scope mount milled integral with the receiver as the first production rifles in the late 1960s had simple rounded-top receivers drilled and tapped for separate scope mounts.

=== M77 Mark II ===
The M77 was entirely retooled and reintroduced in 1991 as the Model 77 Mark II. Barrels were now hammer forged at Ruger's factory. The safety, bolt, trigger, and bottom metal were substantially redesigned as well. The claw extractor was retained, but the bolt face was opened up to turn the action into a true controlled-round feed. The plunger ejector was replaced with a Mauser style fixed blade ejector. The tang safety of the original model was replaced by a three-position safety, similar to Winchester M70, which allowed the bolt to be operated while the gun was still on safe. Ruger also eliminated the factory-supplied adjustable trigger available on the original M77. With the Mark II, several variants were offered ranging from blued steel alternatives to stainless steel and from circassian walnut stocks to synthetic.

=== M77 RSM Mark II ===
This variant of the M77, often known as the Safari Magnum, features a circassian walnut stock, express sights and a long magnum action designed for cartridges such as the .375 H&H, .416 Rigby, and the .458 Lott.

=== M77 Hawkeye ===
In 2006, Ruger introduced new features and a new name for their rifle, the Hawkeye. Major changes were made to the trigger system and the stock was recontoured, but otherwise the rifle remained unchanged. The LC6 trigger addressed complaints from consumers about the Mark II trigger to make it easier for gunsmith adjustment than the earlier design. The LC6 trigger is lighter and smoother.

Ruger has launched many variants of the Hawkeye, from classic walnut stock and blued steel to high grade synthetic stocks and stainless steel. Among the latest inclusions for the M77 hawkeye is a 5R rifling free floated barrel as well as picattiny rails as alternative to Ruger's original rings.

The Hawkeye featured the introduction of a new line of short magnum cartridges such as the .300 Ruger Compact Magnum as well as the proprietary dangerous game cartridges .375 Ruger and .416 Ruger, both of them capable of being chambered in standard length actions opposed to the long Magnum action calibers, offered in the RSM variant of the former Mark II Version of the M77. Both cartridges are currently offered in both, the African and Alaskan variants of the Hawkeye.

=== .30-06 Cal SAR (Search and Rescue) rifle ===
The SAR Rifle, .30-06 caliber, RUGER, Model M77 is a rifle designed for use by Canada's search and rescue technicians (SAR Techs) and aircrews. The SAR Rifle is designed to be a compact survival rifle chambered in .30-06 Springfield. The rifle is based on the standard M77 Mk II rifle but the barrel has been shortened to 14.5 in (370 mm). The orange coloured buttstock has been modified so that it can fold along the left hand side of the stock and it also can hold six additional rounds of ammunition. The rifle is issued with a special case that has been designed to attach to the search and rescue technicians' parachute harnesses.

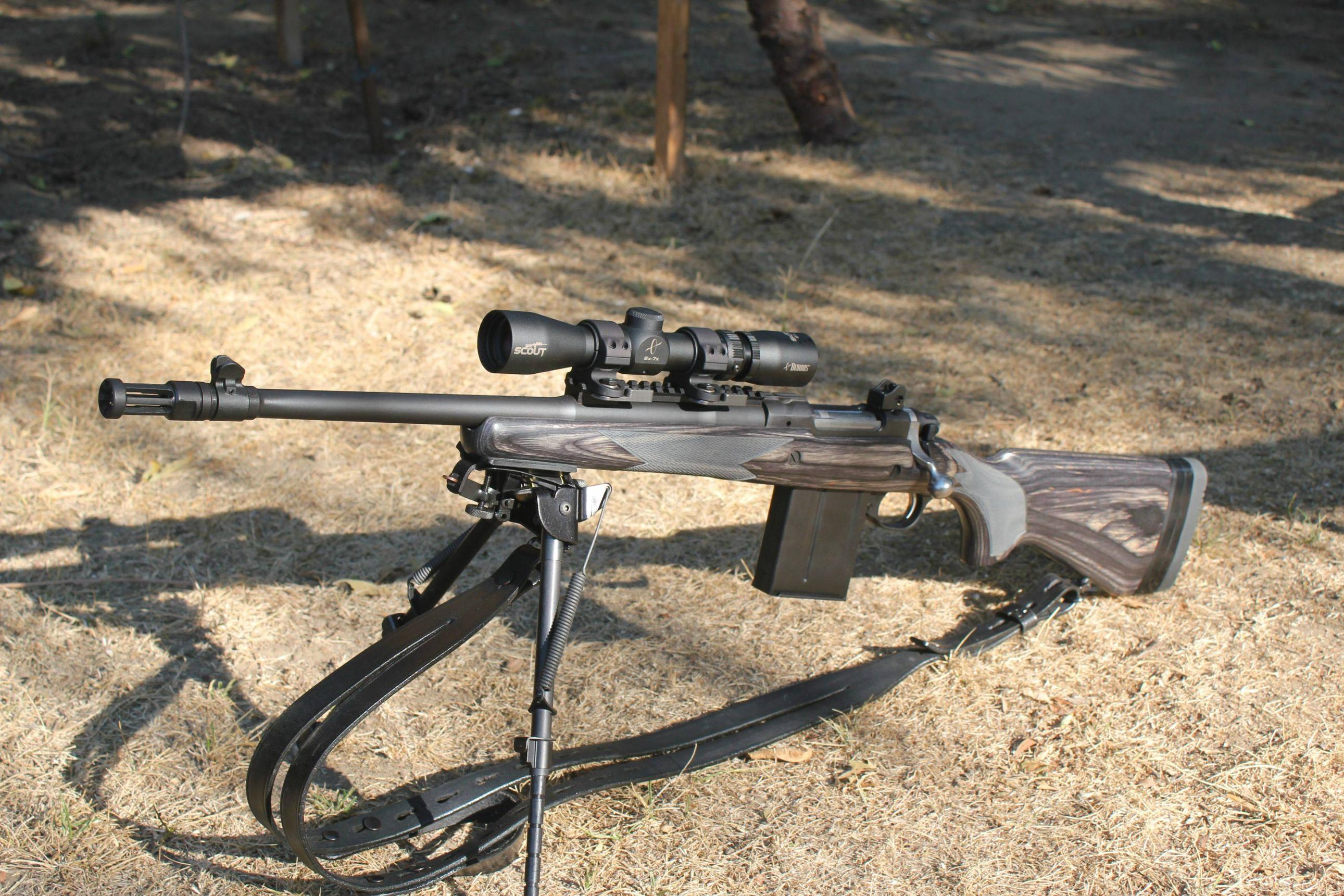
Gunsite Scout Rifle

=== Gunsite Scout rifle ===
To develop the Gunsite Scout, Ruger worked closely with Gunsite Training Center in 2013 to meet the criteria of the modern scout rifle set forth by Colonel Jeff Cooper. The rifle is chambered in .308 Winchester, weighs 7 lb (3.2 kg), has a 16.5 in (420 mm) barrel and black laminate stock, ghost-ring iron sights, flash hider and a picatinny rail for optics mounting, and uses a 10-round Mini-14 style magazine. In 2014, Ruger released a second model of the Gunsite Scout Rifle chambered in .223 Wylde, a hybrid chambering that is designed to accurately, reliably, and safely fire both .223 Remington and 5.56x45mm NATO cartridges. It weighs 7.1 lb (3.2 kg), has a 16.1 in (410 mm) 1/2-28 pitch threaded barrel with a standard Ruger flash hider, a 1:8 twist rate, and uses a standard Mini-14 magazine.
