= .375 Dakota =

Rifle cartridge

- Type: Rifle
- Place of origin: USA

Production history
- Designer: Don Allen
- Manufacturer: Dakota Arms

Specifications
- Parent case: .404 Jeffery
- Case type: bottleneck
- Bullet diameter: .375 in (9.5 mm)
- Neck diameter: .400 in (10.2 mm)
- Shoulder diameter: .529 in (13.4 mm)
- Base diameter: .545 in (13.8 mm)
- Rim diameter: .543 in (13.8 mm)
- Rim thickness: .050 in (1.3 mm)
- Case length: 2.570 in (65.3 mm)
- Overall length: 3.330 in (84.6 mm)

Ballistic performance
Bullet mass/type	Velocity	Energy
227 gr (15 g) Hornady Spire Point Interlock	2,700 ft/s (820 m/s)	4,370 ft⋅lbf (5,920 J)
- Test barrel length: 25 in (640 mm); Source(s): Chuckhawks, Hornady

The .375 Dakota is dangerous game cartridge designed by Don Allen, the founder of Dakota Arms of Sturgis, South Dakota.

Like the .375 Ruger and the .376 Steyr, the .375 Dakota was designed to compete with the .375 H&H Magnum, yet have the advantage of having a rimless, beltless case and can function through a standard-length rifle action due to a shorter overall length. Like the .375 Remington Ultra Magnum, this cartridge is based on the Canadian Magnum series of rifle cartridges developed by Aubrey White and Noburo Uno, which were based on the .404 Jeffery cartridge. However, unlike the .375 RUM and the .375 Canadian Magnum cartridges which have rebated rims, the Dakota is of a rimless design. Since the .375 Dakota is a proprietary cartridge neither SAAMI or the CIP have provided guidelines or specifications concerning the cartridge.

The .375 Dakota is available in the Dakota Model 76 and Model 97 bolt-action rifles and the Model 10 and Miller single-shot rifles. Both the Model 76 and Model 97 rifles are incorporate elements from the Winchester Model 70 and rifles developed by Mauser, while the Model 10 and Miller are falling-block rifles.

== Performance comparison ==
.375 Dakota vs other .375 caliber (9.5 mm) cartridges
Cartridge	Bullet weight	Muzzle velocity	Muzzle energy	Source
.375 Dakota	270 gr (17 g)	2,800 ft/s (850 m/s)	4,680 ft⋅lbf (6,350 J)	
.375 Dakota	300 gr (19 g)	2,600 ft/s (790 m/s)	4,502 ft⋅lbf (6,104 J)	
.375 H&H Magnum	300 gr (19 g)	2,670 ft/s (810 m/s)	4,748 ft⋅lbf (6,437 J)	
.375 Remington Ultra Magnum	300 gr (19 g)	2,760 ft/s (840 m/s)	5,073 ft⋅lbf (6,878 J)	
.375 Ruger	300 gr (19 g)	2,660 ft/s (810 m/s)	4,713 ft⋅lbf (6,390 J)	
.375 Winchester	200 gr (13 g)	2,200 ft/s (670 m/s)	2,150 ft⋅lbf (2,920 J)	
.375 Weatherby Magnum	300 gr (19 g)	2,800 ft/s (850 m/s)	5,224 ft⋅lbf (7,083 J)	
.376 Steyr	270 gr (17 g)	2,600 ft/s (790 m/s)	4,052 ft⋅lbf (5,494 J)	

== See also ==
- List of rifle cartridges
