= The Art of the Rifle =

1997 book by Jeff Cooper

- Author: Jeff Cooper
- Language: English
- Genre: Non-fiction
- Publication date: 1997

The Art of the Rifle is a concise book explaining the use and techniques of rifles. It was authored by Lt. Col. (R) Jeff Cooper (1920–2006) and published in 1997. In it, Cooper uses short chapters to teach about both physical and mental preparedness for successful rifle shooting, whether for defense, hunting, or competition. His goal was to help the rifle shooter be accurate at any time or place. Col. Cooper was particularly well known for his pistol shooting expertise, popularizing the widely used “Weaver stance” and establishing a large training center in Arizona for military, law enforcement and civilians interested in gaining skill with firearms and defense techniques. Col. Cooper also authored at least half a dozen other books related to shooting since the 1950s. As of 2012, The Art of the Rifle was still in print in hardcover, softcover and electronic formats.

== Rifle common sense ==
The Art of the Rifle suggests reasons for owning a rifle. These include the defense of oneself or one's country. A rifle can also be used to properly fell an animal while hunting. A rifle is used to compete in target shooting matches or just for personal enjoyment. It is important for the rifle to be comfortable for the shooter. Cooper suggests that if the rifle is uncomfortable to hold out from the body with the right arm for a minute, it is too heavy.

The general rules of firearm safety apply before, during, and after use of the firearm. The general safety rules are: all guns are always loaded, never point the muzzle toward anything you are not willing to destroy, keep your finger off the trigger until the sights are on the target, and be sure of your target and what is beyond.

== Trajectory: curve of a bullet in flight ==
A bullet in flight is in projectile motion, meaning no other forces are acting on it except the acceleration due to gravity (and sometimes wind). When a bullet leaves the muzzle, it not only travels forward, but also begins to fall due to the influence of gravity. The downward acceleration is constant and does not depend on how fast the bullet leaves the muzzle. Therefore, in order for a shooter to aim at a distant target and then hit it, the actual trajectory, or path that the bullet follows is a curve, not a straight line. That is, the bullet is shot at a slightly upward angle, and the goal of sighting in the rifle is to match the vertical position of the bullet on the downward part of its trajectory with the target.

This is the reason why rifles are sighted in for specific target distances. This means that the sights are adjusted so that the bullet will hit the location on the target viewed in the center of the sights at a known distance. When shooting at a target significantly closer or farther than the distance for which the rifle was sighted in, the shooter must know about how much higher or lower than the center of the sights the bullet will hit and adjust the aim accordingly. The study of bullet trajectories after they leave the firearm is known as external ballistics.

== Positioning of the body while shooting ==
Cooper instructs that, in the field, the shooting position taken depends on the situation. A standing position would be used when the hunter has to shoot over brush. The animal has usually spotted the hunter and is on the move. The standing position is the least stable of all shooting positions. The kneeling position can also be used when brush is in the way, but the animal is usually unaware of the hunter. It is somewhat steady. The hunter can use shooting sticks or a bi-pod to support the front of the gun while in the position. A rest can also be used in the sitting position. The sitting position is more accurate than the kneeling position; however it is not as quickly assumed. Shooters in the prone position are usually on a somewhat flat surface. Prone is the most comfortable of all the shooting positions, but it takes the longest to assume.

The rest positions used in the field can be almost anywhere. The different shooting positions can be used to take advantage of the rest opportunities. The fork in a tree, a rock, a log, a stump; any of these can be used to steady the gun and show a clearer sight picture. The shooter's right hand should be such that the index finger is above the trigger, but can be adjusted quickly to fire the weapon. The shooter's left hand is usually steadying the firearm in front of the trigger system.

When adjusting the position of the crosshairs on a scope, the shooter should keep their “good” eye open. This is the eye that the shooter is the most comfortable with. Switching eyes is not recommended. Breathing techniques vary, however most prefer to exhale before the shot. The rifle will move the slightest bit when you breathe, so practice is great to determine the breathing patterns while shooting.

The shooting sling can be used to carry a gun when it is more efficient to do so. The gun can be slung muzzle up over the shoulder, or muzzle down. Keeping the firearm pointed in a safe direction is extremely important when using a shooting sling. The shooting sling can also be used to steady the firearm in the sitting, kneeling, or standing positions.

Some shooting competitions are designed to test the ability of the shooter in several positions. The International Shooting Sports Federation (ISSF) recognizes four, three-position events. Two of these events, both called 50 m Rifle, are shot in the Olympics, one for men, the other for women. The two Olympic events are shot with a rimfire rifle at 50m. The two three position events not in the Olympics, 300 m Rifle and 300 m Standard Rifle, are shot with a centerfire rifle at a distance of 300m.

== Being prepared for different situations ==
Cooper insists that practice is the only way to prepare for a situation that requires a quick shot. When that situation arises, the gun is usually not ready. Quickly raising the gun, loading, aiming, and firing take time. When the situation comes, the shooter will be better prepared if he/she practices the scenarios beforehand.

If time allows, sighting in the firearm is important. The scope needs to be adjusted for different ranges, so knowing the expected range beforehand is helpful. Knowing the direction and force of the wind is also important. For a moving target, keeping as steady a sight picture as possible is paramount. Keeping the rifle steady and at the same latitude is good. If the target is moving in longitude, adjustments need to be made. If the target is moving directly toward or away from the shooter, the rifle should not need to be moved side to side.

In the case of a rifle, Cooper suggests that keeping the chamber empty is usually a good idea for safety considerations. However, loading quickly can make the difference between life and death. Keeping the ammunition on the shooters person in a readily accessible position minimizes the time taken fumbling for it. Practicing the slide or action of the rifle gives the shooter a better idea of how smoothly he/she can gain access to the chamber. Putting in the round and closing the access point can be difficult. Practice smooths the process considerably.

== Mindset ==
If the shooter gets too excited, necessary concentration will be lost. Concentrating on the task at hand is more important than worrying or what ifs. The celebrating and adrenaline rush need to be kept in check. Professionalism needs to be kept right after the shot as well, in case a second shot is needed. Every hunter dreams of killing the target in one shot. Even if the shooter is confident that the target is mortally wounded, quickly reloading before checking to see if the animal has dropped can make the difference between possessing the target and having the target get away because of premature celebration. Practicing before the hunt or shooting match will hone or refresh marksmanship skills. Practicing from different positions can prepare the shooter for many of the situations that could arise. Every aspect of practice is important to performance in an actual situation.

== About the author ==
Jeff Cooper (May 10, 1920-September 25, 2006) was known as an expert with firearms. He was one of the world's foremost shooters and shooting experts. Jeff Cooper fought on behalf of the United States in WWII and the Korean War, reaching the rank of lieutenant colonel. In 1976 he founded API (American Pistol Institute) just north of Prescott, Arizona. Now known as Gunsite Training Center, the facility was developed to teach rifle and shotgun classes to military, law enforcement and civilians. He authored many columns related to shooting skills; some of his writings are archived at various websites. in the 1950s and 1960s, Cooper authored several books that are still available, including Custom Rifles, Fighting Handguns, Guns of the Old West, and Handguns Afield. Other more recent books authored by Jeff Cooper include To Ride, Shoot Straight and Speak the Truth, and Principles of Personal Defense.
