= Ruger Gunsite Scout =

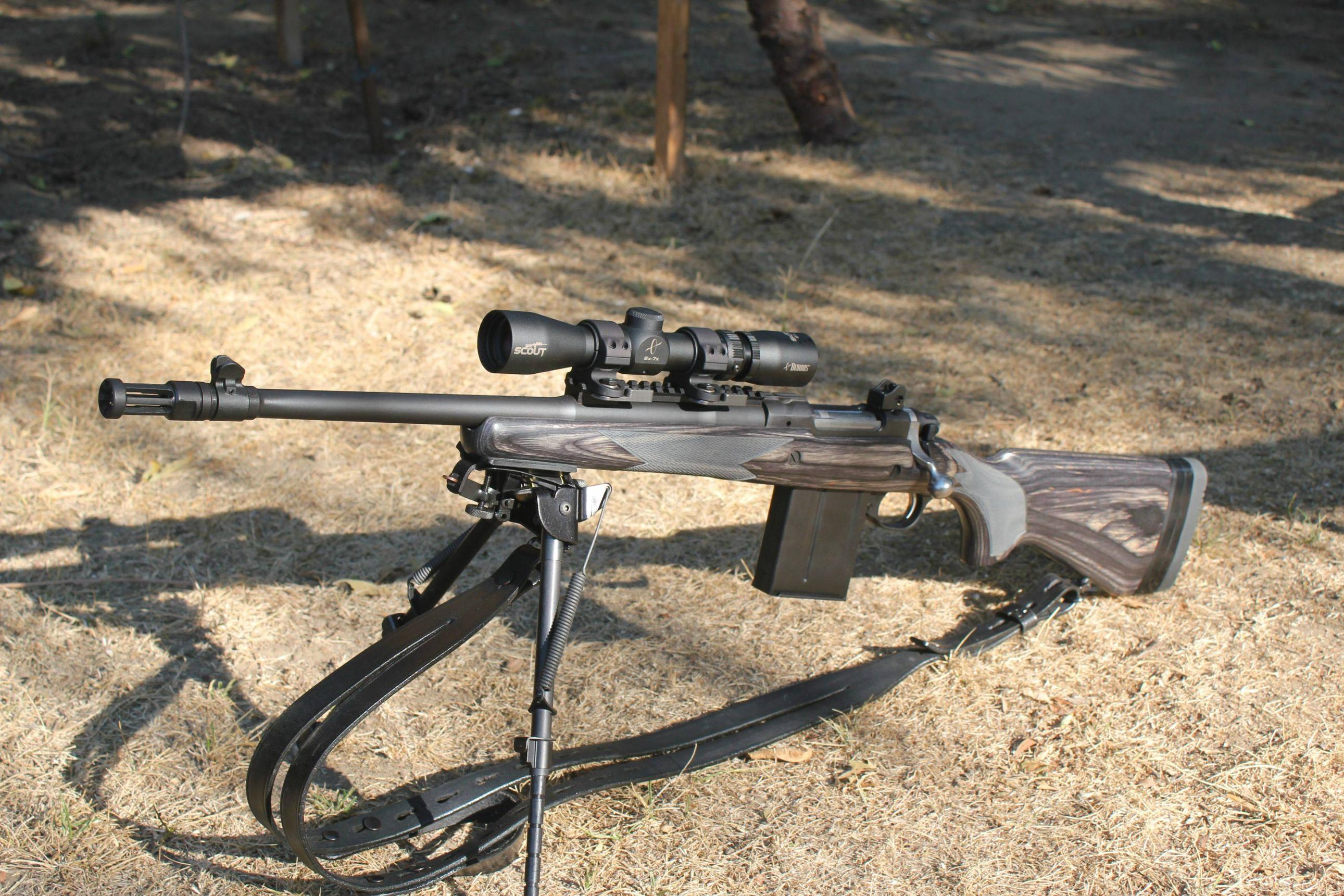
- Ruger Gunsite Scout chambered in .308 Win. The gun is the left-handed black 16.5" model with the Burris Scout Scope, Harris Bipod and Galco Safari Ching Sling.
- Type: Bolt-action rifle
- Place of origin: United States

Production history
- Manufacturer: Sturm, Ruger & Co.
- Unit cost: $1039
- Produced: 2012-2025

Specifications
- Mass: 7 lb (3,200 g) empty, w/ magazine
- Length: 39.5 in (100 cm)
- Barrel length: 16.5 in (42 cm)
- Cartridge: 5.56×45mm NATO, .308 Winchester, .350 Legend, and .450 Bushmaster
- Action: Bolt-action
- Feed system: 3 or 4 (.450 Bushmaster); 5 or 10 round (5.56×45mm NATO and .308 Winchester) detachable box magazine
- Sights: Adjustable ghost-ring rear Iron sights

The Ruger Gunsite Scout is a bolt-action rifle introduced by Sturm, Ruger & Co. at the 2011 SHOT Show. It is a re-designed scout rifle based on their Model 77 action and developed with Gunsite Training Center.

== Background ==
To develop the Gunsite Scout, Ruger worked closely with Gunsite Academy in the development of the rifle, in order to meet the criteria of the modern scout rifle set forth by Jeff Cooper. The original variant of the rifle features a matte black receiver, a 16.5-inch cold-hammer forged alloy steel barrel, a forward mounted picatinny rail, a 3, 5, or 10-round detachable AICS-style box magazine, a flash suppressor, an adjustable ghost-ring rear iron sight, a polymer trigger guard, and a black laminate wood stock with length-of-pull spacers.

== Variants ==
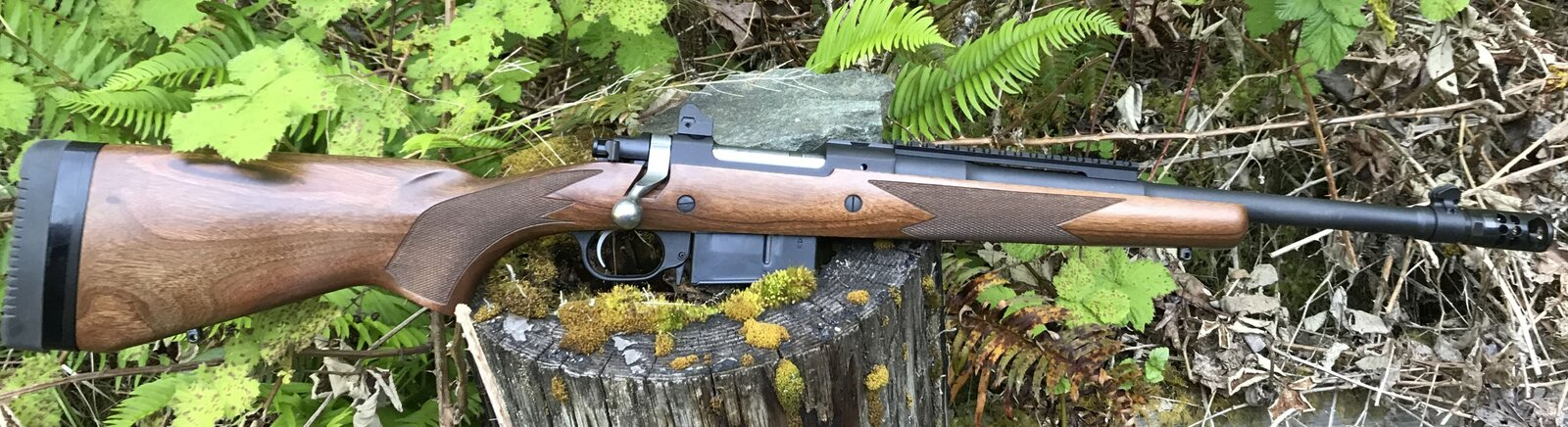
Ruger Gunsite Scout in .450 Bushmaster

- Polymer Stock: some models are offered with a black polymer stock that reduces the overall weight of the bare rifle to at least 6.2 pounds.
- Matte Stainless: features an increased barrel length of 18 inches, a weight of 7.10 pounds, and has an action and barrel made of stainless steel with a matte finish.
- Left-Handed Versions: both the standard 16.5-inch barrel blued and 18-inch barrel matte stainless models are available in left-handed configurations.
- "Export" Model: the Canadian and Australian version of the Ruger Gunsite Scout have a stainless steel barrel and action with an 18-inch barrel without the flash hider. It also lacks the "Gunsite Scout Rifle" name and logo found on the grip cap. As of 2013, the standard model Ruger Gunsite Scout rifle with the 16.5 inch barrel and flash hider and the Matte Stainless is now available for sale in Australia, Canada and other countries.

In addition, a model chambered in 5.56×45mm NATO was announced in 2014.
