= Scout rifle =

Class of general-purpose carbine rifles

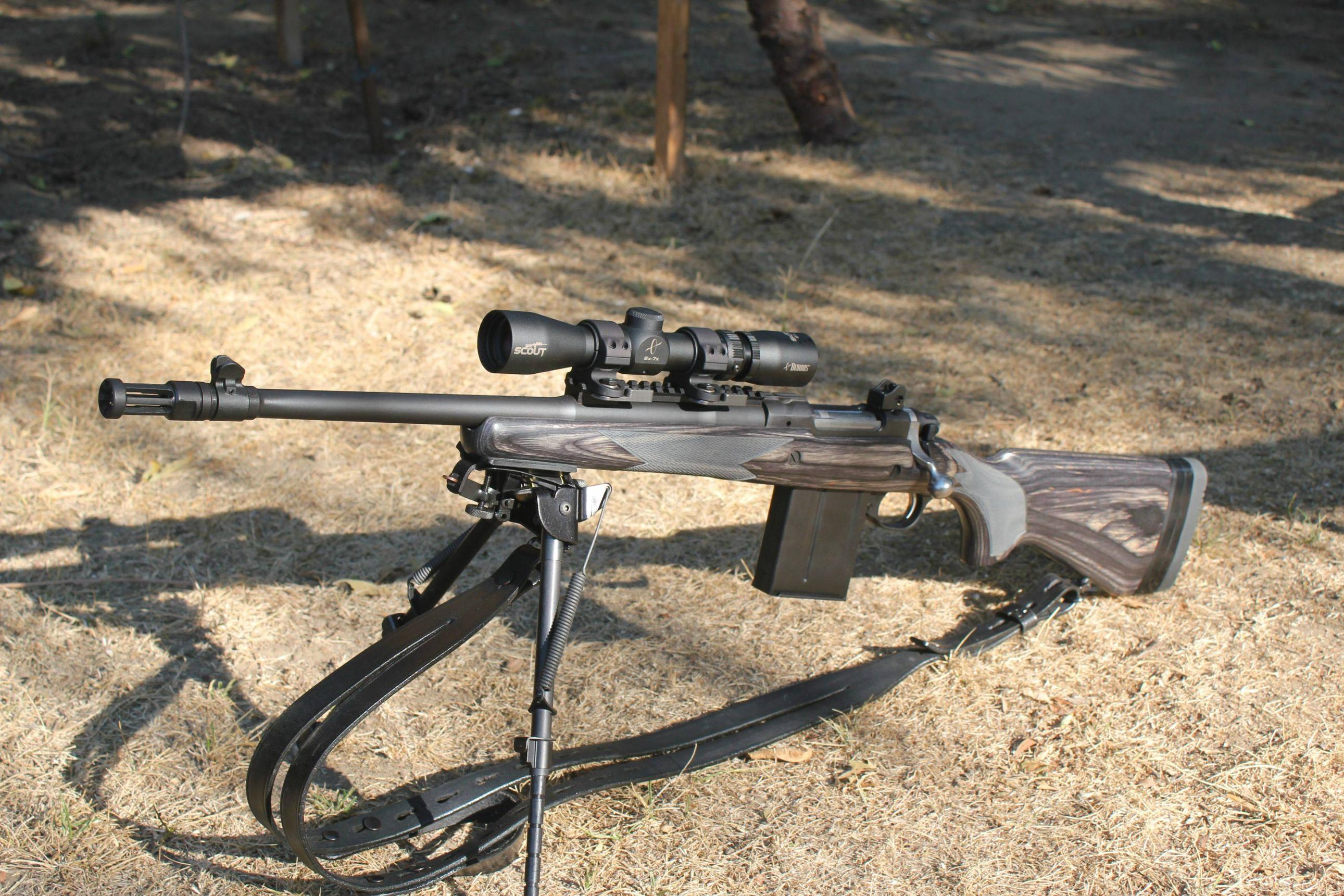
A Ruger M77 Gunsite Scout Rifle chambered in .308Win. The gun is the left -handed black 16.5" model with the Burris Scout Scope, Harris Bipod and Galco Safari Ching Sling.

The scout rifle is a conceptual class of general-purpose rifles defined and promoted by Jeff Cooper in the early 1980s that bears similarities in the design and functionality of guide guns, mountain rifles, and other rifle archetypes, but with more emphasis being placed on comfortable portability and practical accuracy, rather than firepower and long range shooting.

Scout rifles are typically bolt-action carbines chambered for .308 Winchester/7.62×51mm, with an overall length of no more than 39 inches (991 millimetres), with a barrel of 19 inches (483 millimetres) or shorter, and less than 7 pounds (3 kilograms) in weight, with both iron and optical sights and fitted with practical slings (such as Ching slings) for shooting and carrying, and capable of reliably hitting man-sized targets out to 500 yards (457 metres) without telescopic sights. Typically they employ forward-mounted, low-power long-eye relief (LER) scopes or iron sights to afford easy access to the top of the rifle action for rapid manual reloading. Cooper was personally involved with the design work on the Steyr Scout, while other gun manufacturers including Ruger and Savage have since also designed rifles that roughly match Cooper's specifications.

Cooper realized that rifles in the late 20th century differed little from those used by celebrated scouts such as Major Frederick Russell Burnham one hundred years before, and that advances in metallurgy, optics, and plastics could make the rifle a handy, light instrument "that will do a great many things equally well". Cooper's scout-rifle concept was largely influenced by the exploits of the scout Burnham in the Western United States and Africa and as such it is best suited to a man operating either alone or in a two- or three-man team.

"The general-purpose rifle will do equally well for all but specialized hunting, as well as for fighting; thus it must be powerful enough to kill any living target of reasonable size. If you insist upon a definition of 'reasonable size', let us introduce an arbitrary mass figure of about 1,000 pounds (454 kilograms)."

In 1983, a conference was convened at the Cooper's Gunsite Training Center in Arizona to examine the subject of the modernization of rifle design. The members of the conference included gunsmiths, stocksmiths, journalists, marksmanship instructors, inventors and hunters. It was called the First Scout Rifle Conference. A second conference was held in October 1984.

== Defining characteristics ==
Drawing inspiration from several sources, specifically the 1903 Mannlicher–Schönauer and the Winchester Model 1894 carbines, Cooper defined several distinguishing characteristics of a scout rifle:

- Caliber: a standard chambering of .308 Winchester/7.62×51mm NATO or 7mm-08 Remington for locales that forbid civilian ownership of cartridges in chamberings adopted by military forces or for its "slightly better ballistics". As Cooper wrote, "A true Scout comes in .308 or 7mm-08." The .243 Winchester is an alternative for young, small-framed, or recoil-shy people, but needs a 22-inch (56-centimetre) barrel. Cooper also commissioned "Lion Scout," chambered for the .350 Remington Magnum cartridge.
- Action: all Cooper's prototype scout rifles were bolt-actions, however he said "if a semi-automatic action were made which was sufficiently compact and otherwise acceptable, it should certainly be considered". Cooper said the Brno ZKK 601 action is the closest to the guidelines. A bolt-action two-lug, 90° rotation was favored, as was the traditional Mauser claw extractor. The bolt knob should be smooth and round, not checkered and positioned far enough forward of the trigger to avoid pounding of the index finger during firing. The safety should be positive and include three positions. It should disconnect the trigger mechanism rather than blocking it. It should be strong and positive and work from front to rear, rear position "safe" and forward "fire."
- Trigger: smooth and clean, and provide a crisp three pounds (1,400 grams) release.
- Weight: an unloaded weight, with accessories, of seven pounds (3.2 kilograms); with eight pounds (3.6 kilograms) as the maximum acceptable.
- Length: an overall length of 39 inches (990 millimeters) or less and a barrel length of 19 inches (480 millimeters) or less. These two characteristics place scout rifles into the general class of carbines.
- Optics: a forward-mounted telescopic sight of low magnification, typically two to three power. This preserves the shooter's peripheral vision, keeps the ejection port open to allow the use of stripper clips to reload the rifle, and eliminates any chance of the scope striking one's brow during recoil. Cooper has stated that a telescopic sight is not mandatory.
- Reserve sights: ghost ring auxiliary iron sights: a rear sight consisting of a receiver-mounted large-aperture thin ring, and typically a square post front sight on the receiver bridge and not on the end of the barrel, where it catches on things, breaks, snags and muddies up. This allows the rifle to be accurately aimed at short to medium ranges even if the scope becomes damaged.
- Stock: synthetic rather than wood stocks. Heel of the butt rounded to avoid snagging on the shirt. A spare magazine stored in the butt. A retractable bipod that does not protrude from the stock.
- Magazine: magazine should be so constructed as to protect the points of soft point spitzer bullets as they ride in the magazine. Some sort of magazine cut-off permitting the rifle to be used in the single-shot mode with the magazine in reserve. An alternative to the magazine cut-off is a detachable box magazine with a double detent which could be inserted to its first stop not allowing the bolt to feed it. When desired, the magazine could be pressed into its second stop, permitting the bolt to pick up the top cartridge.
- Sling: a "Ching" or "CW" sling. Against common practice, Cooper advocated the use of a sling as a shooting aid. The Ching sling offers the convenience of a carrying strap and the steadiness of a target shooter's sling with the speed of a biathlete's sling. (The CW sling is a simpler version of a Ching sling, consisting of a single strap.)
- Accuracy: should be capable of shooting into 2 MOA (0.6 mrad) or 4 inches (10 centimetres) at 200 yards (183 metres) (three shot groups)

These features dictated short, thin barrels, synthetic stocks, and bolt actions. Other optional features included a retractable bipod, detachable magazines, a buttstock ammunition or magazine holding pouch, and an accessory rail for mounting a flashlight, laser sight, among other attachments. The addition of some of these features often renders the rifle technically not a scout as originally defined, but this has come to be accepted by many as still conforming to the spirit if not to the letter of the concept.

== Shooting and use ==
Although it is unusual in appearance and design when compared to traditional rifles, the features which set the scout rifle apart were selected for utility rather than appearance. The scope sight is mounted on the barrel both for stability, and some claim it also allows faster acquisition of the sighting line when the rifle is brought to the shoulder. It also keeps the breech and ejection port of the weapon clear of obstruction, allowing rapid top-loading of cartridges and clearance of jams or other obstructions.

Being slightly shorter than most full-caliber rifles increases the muzzle blast from a scout rifle, and being lightweight increases the felt recoil (to a significant level in the Steyr Dragoon Scout due to its .376 Steyr cartridge). Even the recoil of the .308 Winchester in a scout was described as feeling like a .300 Winchester Magnum by Gun Tests.

Should the scope be damaged, it can be rapidly removed and the ghost ring sight used. A ghost ring is an iron aperture sight.

== Commercial variants ==
For many years, scout rifles were only available from custom gunsmiths. However, a number of manufacturers build scout rifles close to Cooper's specifications.

=== Steyr Scout ===
The version considered by some to be the benchmark is the Steyr Scout.

In 1998, Steyr Mannlicher of Austria began series production of the Steyr Scout, which is also known as the Mannlicher Scout. Jeff Cooper spent many years of reflection and working with Steyr before they began production built to the specifications developed. A heavy-caliber version is chambered for the proprietary .376 Steyr cartridge, but exceeds (by approximately one inch) the overall length limit of the scout rifle specification. This version carries four rounds in the magazine, compared to five in the standard Steyr Scout. A version is also produced in the 5.56×45mm/.223 Remington round used in various current military assault rifles.

The Steyr Scout features an integral bipod, as well as storage for a spare, loaded magazine. The rifle is also designed to allow either single-shot, manually loaded fire or normal magazine feeding.

Despite being civilian rifles, Steyr Scouts were used by the Kosovo Liberation Army in the Kosovo War.

In January 2015, Steyr Arms announced that a limited edition Steyr Camo Scout would be available in three variations of hydro-dipped camouflage due to customer demand.

=== Savage Scout ===
Savage Arms offered the Model 10FCM Scout with their adjustable AccuTrigger (allowing the owner to safely adjust trigger pull weight to anywhere between 2.5 and 6.0 lb (1,100 and 2,700 g) without the need of a gunsmith), black synthetic AccuStock with aluminum spine and three-dimensional bedding cradle, a 20.5 in (520 mm) free-floating button-rifled barrel, oversized bolt knob for rapid manipulation of the bolt, ghost ring rear sight, forward scope mount, and detachable 4-round box magazine in either .308 Winchester or 7.62×39mm with a total weight of 6.75 lb (3.06 kg) and an overall length of 39.75 in (1,010 mm). It was discontinued in 2014. Savage re-introduced their Scout as the 11 Scout in 2015 and improved it by adding a 3rd sling swivel, butt spacers and an adjustable cheek-piece to a "natural" colored stock.

For 2018, the rifle was again refreshed to incorporate the "Accu-Fit" system as well as abandoning the proprietary magazine of the earlier models in favor of an Accuracy International AICS magazine, which provides greater compatibility across brands.

=== Ruger Frontier ===
Sturm, Ruger & Co. offered several M77 Mark II Frontier rifles in stainless steel in various chamberings from varmint to heavy game all featuring a non-rotating, Mauser-type controlled-feed extractor and a fixed blade-type ejector.

In a review of a 7mm-08 Frontier Model 77, John Taffin wrote, "If it is possible to love an inanimate object such as a rifle, I am definitely in love. This Model 77 Mk II Frontier is everything I had been looking for in a lightweight, compact, easy-to-carry 7-08mm bolt-action rifle and more."

=== Ruger Gunsite Scout ===
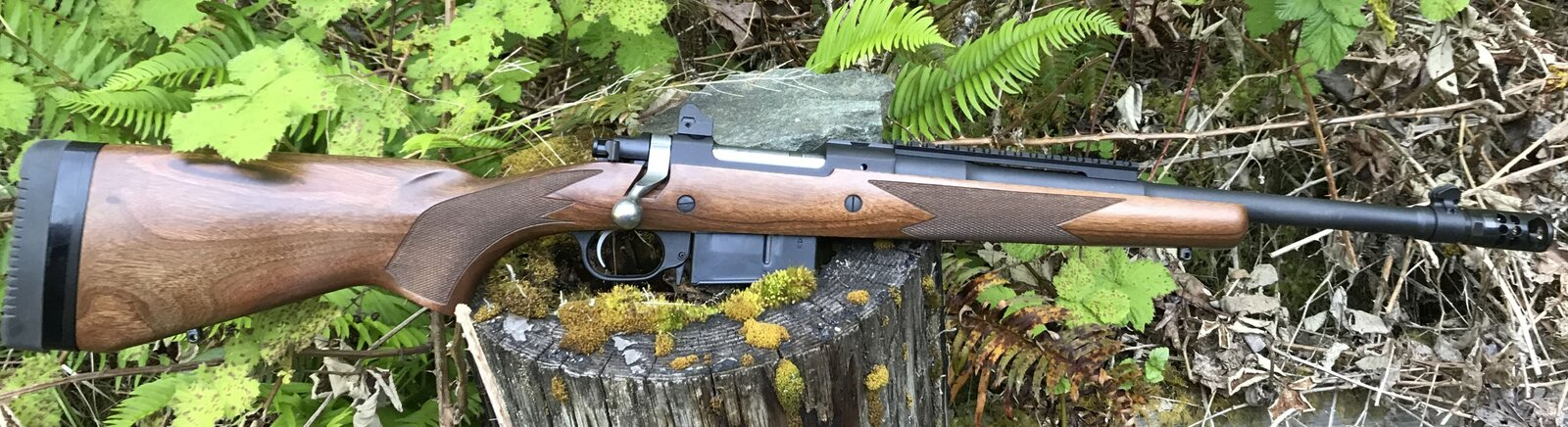
Ruger Gunsite Scout in .450 Bushmaster

In 2011, Ruger introduced the Ruger Gunsite Scout, a redesigned scout rifle based on their Model 77 action and developed with Gunsite Training Center. The new rifle debuted at the 2011 SHOT show bearing the adopted name "Gunsite Scout Rifle" mounted on the grip cap. The rifle features a matte black receiver, a 16.5 in (420 mm) cold-hammer forged alloy steel barrel, a forward mounted picatinny rail, a 3, 5 or 10-round detachable box magazine, a flash suppressor, an adjustable ghost-ring rear iron sight, a polymer trigger guard, and a black laminate wood stock with length-of-pull spacers. The rifle is chambered in .308 caliber and weighs 7 pounds (3.2 kg).

=== Mossberg MVP Scout ===
At the 2015 SHOT Show, O.F. Mossberg & Sons introduced a scout rifle based on their MVP platform. The Mossberg MVP Scout is offered in both 5.56×45mm and .308 Winchester chamberings. The MVP platform is notable for being designed to feed from either AR-15-compatible STANAG magazines (in the 5.56mm variant) or AR-10- and M1A/M14-compatible magazines (in the .308 variant). The MVP Scout features a synthetic matte black receiver, a 16.5 in (420 mm) medium threaded bull barrel that comes stock with an A2-style flash hider, an extended Picatinny rail as well as a ghost-ring rear sight and fiber-optic front sight. The .308 caliber MVP Scout weights 6.75 pounds (3.06 kg).

=== Howa Scout Rifle ===
Scout variant of Howa Model 1500. Comes with 18.5 in (470 mm) threaded barrel and available in .308 Winchester only.

== External references ==
- Jeff Cooper, "The Art of the Rifle"
- Armi E Tiro (Italy), January 1998, Anteprima – Steyr Mannlicher Scout calibro .308 Winchester – L'Esploratore, p. 56
- Law Enforcement Technology, January 1998, Firearms Column, The Steyr Scout Rifle, by Tom Ellis, p. 27.
- Guns & Weapons for Law Enforcement, February 1998, The "Scout Rifle" Arrives, by Gary Paul Johnson, p. 18
- IWM-Internationales Waffen Magazin (Swiss), January – February 1998, Der neue STEYR-SCOUT- Repetier fur (fast) alle Zwecke, p. 13
- Petersen's Rifle Shooter, February 1998, Steyr's Scout Rifle, by G. Sitton, p. 30
- Soldier of Fortune, February 1998, Steyr Scout Rifle – A Gun For All Seasons, by Peter G. Kokalis, p. 48
- Special Weapons for Military and Police (1998 Annual) – The Steyr Scout, by Chris McLoughlin, p. 10
- The Mannlicher Collector-No. 51, Cooper and Hambrusch Début The Steyr Scout, by Don L. Henry, p. 2
- INTERSEC-The Journal of International Security, March 1998, Firepower for Security, by Nick Steadman, p. 89
- ARMI Magazine (Italy), April 1998, Scout Rifle da Steyr, p. 20
- Guns & Ammo, April 1998, The Steyr Scout Breaks Out, by George Sitton, p. 52
- Safari Times Africa, April 1998, Steyr-Mannlicher introduces Jeff Cooper's "Scout Rifle" concept, p. 4
- Shooting Industry, Steyr Unveils Coop[er's Scout Rifle, April, by Cameron Hopkins, p. 44
- S.W.A.T., April, Rifle Roll-Out—Steyr Scout, by Michael Harries, p. 46
- Visier-Das Internationale Waffen-Magazin (Germany), April 1998, Vorschau, Gary Paul Johnston, p. 42
- Rifle, May 1998, It's a Scout! – Cooper's Dream Rifle, by Don L. Henry, p. 26
- CIBLES (France), June 1998, Banc d'essai—Le Fusil Steyr Scout, p. 25
- Deutsches Waffen-Journal (Germany), July, Generalist, by Wolfgang Kräusslich and Walter Schultz, p. 1022
- Caliber (Germany), July 1998, Attraktive Attacke aus Austria, by Stefan Perey & Michael Fischer, p. 26
- Guns & Ammo, July 1998, The Scout Rifle: Some Principles, by Jeff Cooper, p. 74
- Metsästys ja Kalastus 7 (Finland), July 1998, M&K Esttelee-Steyr Scout, Teksti Louhisola & Kuvat Soikkanen, p. 56
- VISIER (Germany), July 1998, Auf frischer Fährte, by Siegfried Schwarz, p. 110
- Armas (Spain), August 1998 (#195 issue), Steyr Scout – Capricho Tactico, by Luis Perez de Leon, p. 10
- Gun Tests, August 1998, New Steyr Scout Rifle! An Interesting Performer, p. 22
- SA Man/Magnum (South Africa), August 1998, The Steyr Scout, by Koos Barnard, p. 35
- SAM Wapenmagazine No. 94 (Netherlands), August/September 1998, Het Steyr
- Scout geweer, by Door B. J. Martens, p. 12
- Vapentidningen (Sweden), #5, Vol. 5, 1998, Jägarens nyap vapen, by Sverker Ulving, p. 38
- Våpenjournalen (Norway), #4, 1998, Steyr Scout, by Geir Wollman, p. 8
- The American Rifleman, September, 1998, The Steyr Scout Rifle Realized, by Mark A. Keffe, IV, p. 34
- AK56 Wapenmagazine (Netherlands), October 1998, Steyr Scout-Millennium Proof, p. 22
- Der Anblick (Austria), October 1998, Der Steyr Scout—auch ein Jagdgewehr, by Ralph Schober, p. 56
- IWM-Internationales Waffen Magazin (Swiss), October, 1998, Steyr Scout & Tactical Rifle, by Martin Schober, P. 524
- Jager Hund & Våpen (Norway), October 1998, Våpen Test—Steyr Scout Rifla for alle-til alt, p. 92
- Deutsches Waffenjournal (Germany), November 1998, Flint 98-Design und besondere Leistungen (Steyr Scout awarded the Flint 98 Award for design)
- GUNS, November 1998, Scout, by Hold Bodinson, p. 38.
- St. Hubertus (Austria), November 1998, Steyr's Scout Rifle, by Roland Zeitler, p. 31
- Small Arms Review, December, 1998, Steyr Scout Factory Modifications, by Nick Steadman, p. 10
- Waffenwelt (German), Issue 15, 1998, Steyr Scout-Repetierer in .308 Winchester, p. 20
- Allt om Jakt & Vapen (Sweden), January 1999, Den lille scouten, by Eric Wallin, p. 16
- Guns & Ammo, January 1999, Afield with the Scout, by Jeff Cooper, p. 72
- Small Arms Review, January, 1999, The Steyr Scout Rifle, by Charles Q. Cutshaw, p. 23
- Small Arms Review, January, 1999, Steyr Scout Tactical Rifle, by Nick Steadman, p. 15
- American Survival Guide, February 1999, Steyr Scout Rifle, by Phil W. Johnston, p. 70
- Todo Tiro (Spain), February, 1999, Banco de pruebas: Rifle Steyr Scout. Un perfecto to do-terreno", by A. J. Lopez. p. 10
- Rifle Magazine, March–April 1999, Two Steyr Scout Rifles, by Finn Aagaard, p. 38
- Jaktmarker & Fiskevatten (Sweden), Nr.4, 1999, Mannlicher Scout – önskevapen för rörlig jakt, by Fredrik Franzén, p. 42
- Deutsches Waffen Journal (Germany), July, 1999, On Tour Mit der Scout Rifle im Yukon, p. 1148
- Shooting Sports Magazine (UK), August 1999, The Steyr Mannlicher Scout Rifle, p. 22
- Shooting Times, January 2000, Shooting Steyr's Scout Bolt-Action Rifle, by Rick Jamison, p. 42
- Guns Magazine, February 2000, Steyr's Scout Rifle, by Barrett Tilman, p. 70
- American Rifleman, March 2000, Big Bore Alternative: The .376 Steyr, by Scott E. Mayer
- SA Man/ Magnum (South Africa), April 2000, New .376 Steyr Blooded on Bison, by Jeff Cooper, p. 27
- Guns & Weapons for Law Enforcement, September 2000, New Steyr .308 Tactical Scout, by Al Paulson, p. 40
- The Tactical Edge (NTOA Journal), Fall 2000, Vol 18, No. 4,
- Countermeasures Column, Steyr Scout Tactical serves multiple needs, by Robert W. Parker, p. 78
- African Hunter, Vol 6, Number 6 (Indaba Issue or December 2000) Ingozi -The Accident Rifle, by Jim Dodd, p. 20.
- The Mannlicher Collector, #62, 2000, Portable Powerhouse the .376 Steyr Scout, by Eric Ching, p. ?
- African Perspectives, Vol ? Number ?, Current African cartridges: The .376 Steyr, by Eric Ching, page I.
- List from the Steyr Scout Website www.steyrscout.org
