= .375 Ruger =

Cartridge

.375 Ruger (9.5×65.5mm)
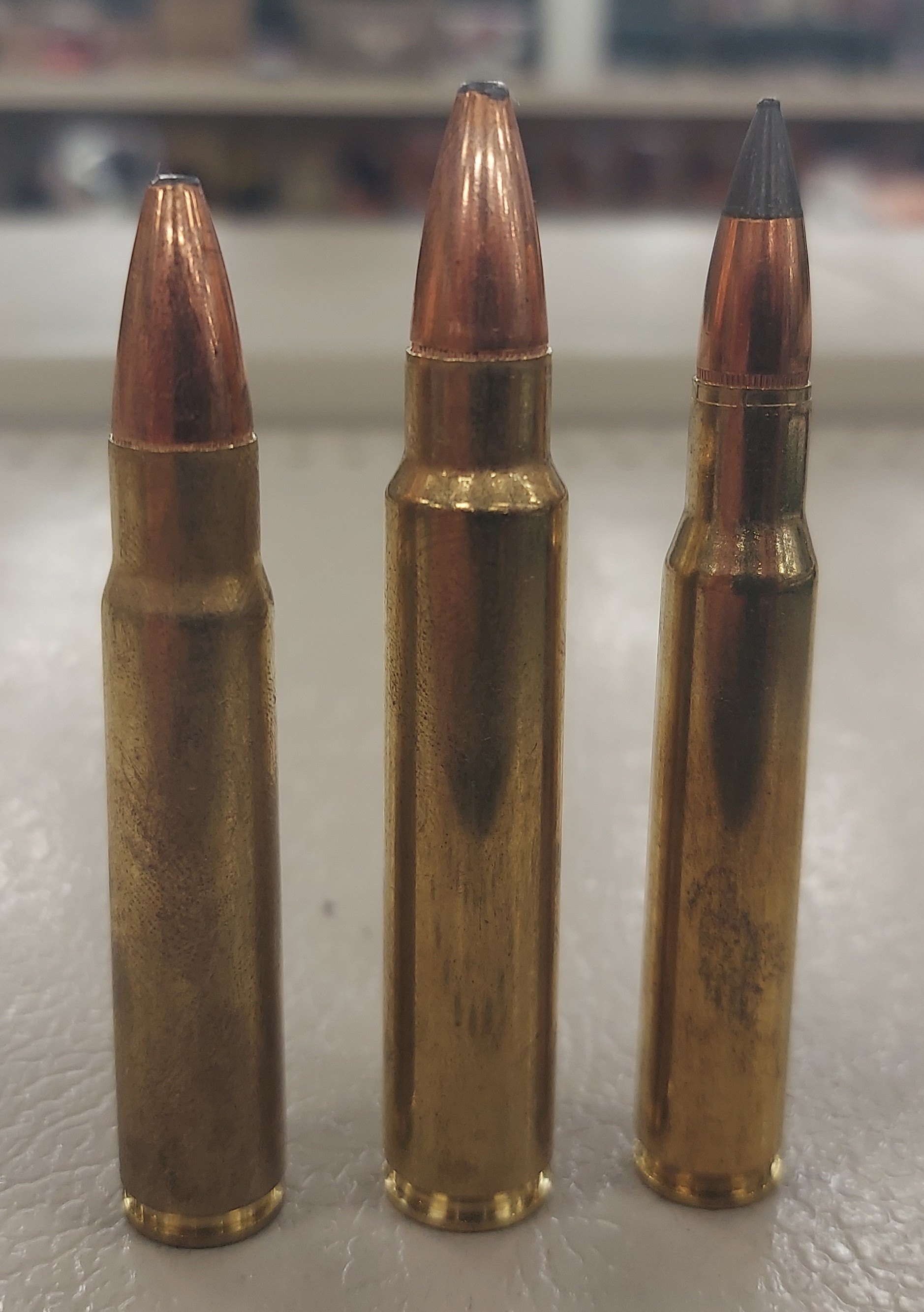
- Center, with .376 Steyr (left) and .30-06 (right)
- Type: Rifle
- Place of origin: USA

Production history
- Designer: Ruger
- Designed: 2007
- Produced: 2007–present

Specifications
- Parent case: Unique
- Case type: Rimless, bottleneck
- Bullet diameter: .375 in (9.5 mm)
- Neck diameter: .405 in (10.3 mm)
- Shoulder diameter: .515 in (13.1 mm)
- Base diameter: .532 in (13.5 mm)
- Rim diameter: .532 in (13.5 mm)
- Rim thickness: .050 in (1.3 mm)
- Case length: 2.580 in (65.5 mm)
- Overall length: 3.340 in (84.8 mm)
- Case capacity: 99.0 gr H_{2}O (6.42 cm^{3})
- Rifling twist: 1 in 12 in (300 mm)
- Primer type: Large rifle
- Maximum pressure (SAAMI): 62,000 psi (430 MPa)
- Maximum pressure (CIP): 62,004 psi (427.50 MPa)

Ballistic performance
Bullet mass/type	Velocity	Energy
235 gr (15 g) Speer Hot-Cor	3,177 ft/s (968 m/s)	5,266 ft⋅lbf (7,140 J)
270 gr (17 g) Speer Spitzer BTSP	3,005 ft/s (916 m/s)	5,413 ft⋅lbf (7,339 J)
285 gr (18 g) Speer Grand Slam	2,946 ft/s (898 m/s)	5,492 ft⋅lbf (7,446 J)
- Test barrel length: 24 inches Source

The .375 Ruger (9.5×65.5mm) is a rimless, standard-length rifle cartridge designed for hunting large, dangerous game. It is designed to provide an increase in performance over the .375 H&H cartridge within the context of a standard-length rifle action. The cartridge was designed in partnership by Hornady and Ruger. In 2007, it was released commercially and chambered in the Ruger Hawkeye African and the Ruger Hawkeye Alaskan rifles.

== Design & Specifications ==
Like the .376 Steyr that originates from the 9.3×64mm Brenneke and the .375 Dakota proprietary cartridge that originates from the .404 Jeffery, the .375 Ruger was designed to compete with the .375 H&H Magnum, yet have the advantage of having a rimless, beltless case and can function through a standard-length bolt-action rifle due to a shorter overall length.

The .375 Ruger uses a unique cartridge case designed by Hornady and Ruger. The case is of a rimless design having the base and rim diameter of .532 in (13.5 mm), which is the same diameter as the belt on belted magnum cases based on the .300 H&H Magnum and .375 H&H Magnum. This allows the cartridge to have a greater case capacity than a belted magnum case given cases of equal length. As Ruger intended the cartridge to be chambered in standard-length bolt-action rifles, the case length was kept to 2.580 in (65.5 mm), which is only .04 in (1.0 mm) longer than the .270 Winchester case. The maximum overall length of the cartridge is 3.340 in (84.8 mm), which is similar to the maximum overall length of standard-length cartridges such as the .338 Winchester Magnum or the .30-06 Springfield. Unlike Remington Ultra Magnum cartridges, the Ruger Magnums can be chambered in standard-length bolt-action rifles. This allowed Ruger to chamber the cartridge in their existing standard length M77 rifle, without needing to use their M77 Safari Magnum Rifle.

While the .375 H&H Magnum is longer than the .375 Ruger, the latter cartridge has a 4% greater case capacity than the Holland & Holland cartridge, 99 gr. of water (6.42 cm^{3}) compared to the H&H's 95. This is due to the .375 H&H Magnum having a long, tapered body, while the .375 Ruger follows modern cartridge designs in that it has very little taper and a sharper shoulder.

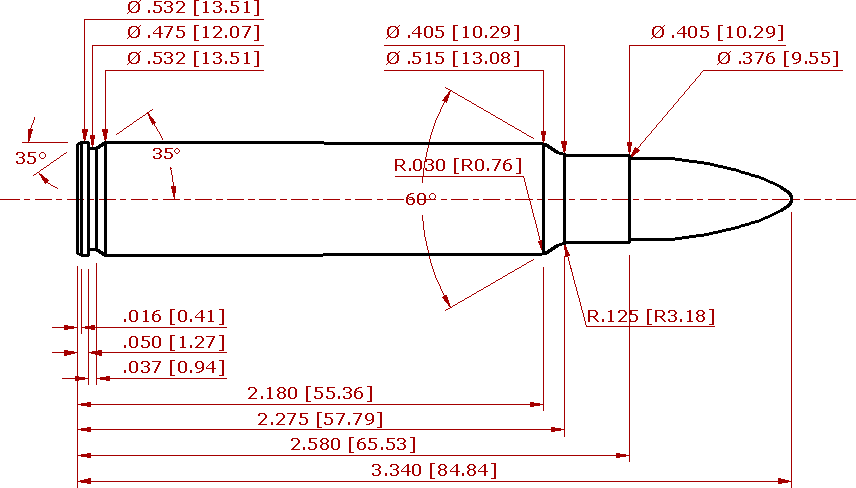

Cartridge standards for the .375 Ruger were issued by SAAMI in June 2007. SAAMI recommends a six-groove barrel having a bore Ø of .366 in (9.3 mm) and a groove Ø of .376 in (9.6 mm) with a groove width of .115 in (2.9 mm). The recommended rate of twist is one revolution in 12 in (304.8 mm). Recommended maximum pressure for the cartridge is 62,000 psi (4,300 bar).

== Performance ==
Currently, Hornady and Double Tap manufacture ammunition for the .375 Ruger cartridge. The Hornady Superformance ammunition drives a 270-grain (17.5 g) SP-RP bullet at 2,840 ft/s (870 m/s) and the 300-grain (19.4 g) DGS and DGX bullets at 2,660 ft/s (810 m/s). The original Hornady loads were not Superformance, but had the same velocity, with the Superformance loading offering lower recoil due to a smaller propellant charge, and less steep pressure curve. The Double Tap achieves 2,825 ft/s (861 m/s) and 4,700 ft⋅lb (6,400 J) with a 270-grain Barnes TSX from a 23-inch barrel Ruger 77 African. The .375 Ruger's greater case capacity, and the "short fat" cartridge efficiency lead to increases in the neighborhood of 150 to 200 fps over the .375 H&H Magnum cartridge. Their capabilities for big game hunting remain essentially comparable. The muzzle velocity advantage can allow rifles chambered in .375 Ruger to use 20 inch barrels and still match the ballistics of the .375 H&H Magnum with a 26 inch barrel. Combined with the fact that the .375 Ruger fits in a shorter action, it allows hunters to use rifles that are shorter, lighter, handier and cheaper than muzzle velocity wise comparable magnum-action length action rifles chambered in .375 H&H Magnum. Since 2015, O.F. Mossberg & Sons produced bolt-action rifles of the "Patriot" series chambered in .375 Ruger with different stock options.

== The .375 Ruger as parent case ==
=== .300 Ruger Compact Magnum ===
The .300 Ruger Compact Magnum or .300 RCM was designed in 2007 and uses a case designed by Hornady and Ruger based on the .375 Ruger cartridge. The case is of a rimless design having the base and rim diameter of .532 in (13.5 mm), which is the same diameter of the belt on belted magnum cases based on the .300 H&H Magnum and .375 H&H Magnum. This allows the cartridge to have a greater case capacity than a belted magnum case given cases of equal length. As Ruger intended the cartridge to be chambered in short-length bolt-action rifles, the case length was shortened to 2.10 in (53 mm), which is similar to the .308 Winchester case. Unlike Winchester Short Magnum cartridges, the Ruger Compact Magnums share the same diameter from case head to body. This allowed Ruger to chamber the cartridge without extensively redesigning their Ruger M77 rifle to adapt them to the new Ruger cartridge.

=== .338 Ruger Compact Magnum ===
The .338 Ruger Compact Magnum or .338 RCM is a rimless, short-length rifle cartridge based on the .375 Ruger case. It was designed by Ruger and Hornady and released in 2008 and chambered in various Ruger rifles. The goal was to create a shorter cartridge than the big .338 magnums that would fit in a more compact rifle with nearly the same performance. Similar to the design ideas for the WSM cartridge family, but somewhat narrower which will frequently allow one more cartridge in the rifle magazine than the WSM equivalent. This round is designed for hunting medium- to large-sized North American game.

=== .416 Ruger ===
The .416 Ruger is a beltless, rimless, bottle-necked cartridge designed as a joint venture by Hornady and Ruger in 2008. The cartridge is based on the .375 Ruger case, which was necked up to accept a .416 in (10.6 mm) bullet. It was designed as a dangerous game cartridge, particularly for use in Alaska and Africa.

=== 300 Precision Rifle Cartridge ===
The .375 Ruger cartridge functioned as the parent case for the 300 Precision Rifle Cartridge (300 PRC), which is essentially a necked-down form of the .375 Ruger. Hornady acquired SAAMI standardization for the 300 PRC in 2018. In 2019 C.I.P. also standardized the cartridge.

The 300 PRC cartridge case capacity is 6.2 ml (95.5 grains) H_{2}O. The round is designed particularly for use at extended range, with high cartridge case capacity for caliber, longer than typical bullet projection (a "standard" case length is paired with a "long action" cartridge overall length to prevent bullets from intruding on the powder column), and a throat design that minimizes bullet yaw prior to contact with the rifling. Accordingly, the cartridge is optimized for loading relatively long and heavy .308 diameter very-low-drag bullets.

Rifles chambered for the 300 PRC must be capable of handling (magnum-action length) 3.70 in (93.98 mm) overall length cartridges.

In 2019 the U.S. Department of Defense selected the 300 PRC cartridge as a chambering option for their Barrett MRAD multi-caliber sniper rifle platform. The U.S. Special Operations Command (SOCOM), requested ammunition manufacturers to develop a cartridge that would give snipers a 50% hit probability on a man seized target at 2,000 yards (1,829 m). In the early 2020s the .300 Norma Magnum, offering about 8.9% additional case capacity, was eventually taken into service as the new .30 magnum chambering for the MRAD platform by the U.S. Army.

=== 6.5 and 7mm Precision Rifle Cartridges ===
The .375 Ruger cartridge case was used by Hornady as the basis for new long-range cartridges, since it had the capability to operate with high chamber pressures, which combined with a neck and barrel throat optimized for loading relatively long and heavy very-low-drag bullets without the need to seat the bullets deeply recessed into the case result in adequate muzzle velocities from bolt-action rifles.

The .375 Ruger cartridge functioned as the parent case for the 6.5 Precision Rifle Cartridge (6.5 PRC) and 7mm Precision Rifle Cartridge (7mm PRC), which are essentially necked-down shortened versions of the .375 Ruger. American ammunition manufacturer Hornady got the 6.5 PRC SAAMI-standardized in 2018 simultaneously with the 300 PRC. Also in 2018 it got C.I.P.-standardized as the 6,5 PRC. The 6.5 PRC cartridge case capacity is 4.14 ml (63.9 grains) H_{2}O.

The 7mm Precision Rifle Cartridge (7mm PRC) became SAAMI-standardized in June 2022. In May 2023 it was C.I.P.-standardized as the 7 mm Precision Rifle Cartridge. The 7mm PRC cartridge case capacity is 5.05 ml (78 grains) H_{2}O. Rifles chambered for the 6.5mm PRC must be capable of handling (short-action length) 2.955 in (75.06 mm) overall length cartridges. Rifles chambered for the 7mm PRC must be capable of handling (standard/long-action length) 3.34 in (84.84 mm) overall length cartridges.

=== .500 Bushwhacker ===
The .500 Bushwhacker is a semirimmed magnum handgun cartridge initially developed by fireforming the .375 Ruger case cylindrical, shortening it by 0.13 in, and threading the base for a rim. It was designed by brothers James Tow and Keith Tow of Halsey, Oregon, to provide comparable performance to traditional African stopping rifles from the context of the Magnum Research BFR revolvers.

== See also ==
- Table of handgun and rifle cartridges
