= Ching sling =

Rifle sling

The Ching sling is a tactical rifle sling created by Eric S. H. Ching (13 August 1951 – 28 July 2007) and popularized by Jeff Cooper. The purpose of the sling is to stabilize the rifle as a shooting aid with a minimal amount of adjustment.

== Origins ==
While slings have occasionally been employed as shooting aids, most systems were awkward to handle and required a significant amount of time to implement. In 1986, while attending a rifle class at the American Pistol Institute (now called Gunsite Academy) in Paulden, Arizona under Jeff Cooper, Eric Ching grew mildly irritated with the military sling's disadvantages. He conceived a sling system that was handier and quicker. The sling was adopted by Cooper in his scout rifle system and named after Ching. Galco offers Ching slings as well as their Safari Ching Sling (8 oz) the 3rd generation of the sling that requires only two sling swivels.

== Operation ==
Like the CW Sling, the Ching sling uses three sling sockets. Unlike the CW Sling, the Ching sling consists of a main strap, which is attached to the forearm and buttstock sockets like a normal carry sling, and a short strap. A clockwise half twist in the sling at the fore-end socket allows the strap to lie flat against the arm when shooting. A stop button screws onto the main strap about two-thirds back from the front loop. The short strap attaches to the middle socket and to an oval ring that slides freely along the main strap between the forearm sling loop and the button. The unfinished side faces the muzzle.

== Advantages ==
Proponents of the Ching Sling maintain that the sling allows faster and quieter acquisition of shooting support. The sling requires no shifting of sling loops when converting from carrying mode to shooting mode and can be used on any rifle with existing sling loops in the normal locations with the addition of a middle sling loop and is flexible enough to be used with the rear loop located anywhere between the pistol grip cap and the end of the buttstock.

== History ==
In the early 1980s the "Speed Slings" specified by Jeff Cooper on his scout rifle were derived from the Bisley Two-Point System which was dubbed "CW Sling" after his friend Carlos Widmann of Guatemala. In 1986 when Eric Ching attended the Gunsite school he felt that he could improve the idea of the "Speed Sling" and he came up with a new design which was far more improved than the "CW Sling". The sling was found to be superior and quickly adopted and named "Ching Sling" by Jeff Cooper and the name stuck. The production was handled by custom leather maker Bruce Nelson then to Galco International and Beast Enterprises. The Ching Sling had a second version called Ching Sling II which was longer, more universal, and wider in places for more comfort. The last version was the "Safari Ching Sling" which was improved with wider straps, split main strap, and the U strap which makes carrying from the shoulder position more comfortable and secure.
