= .376 Steyr =

Rifle cartridge

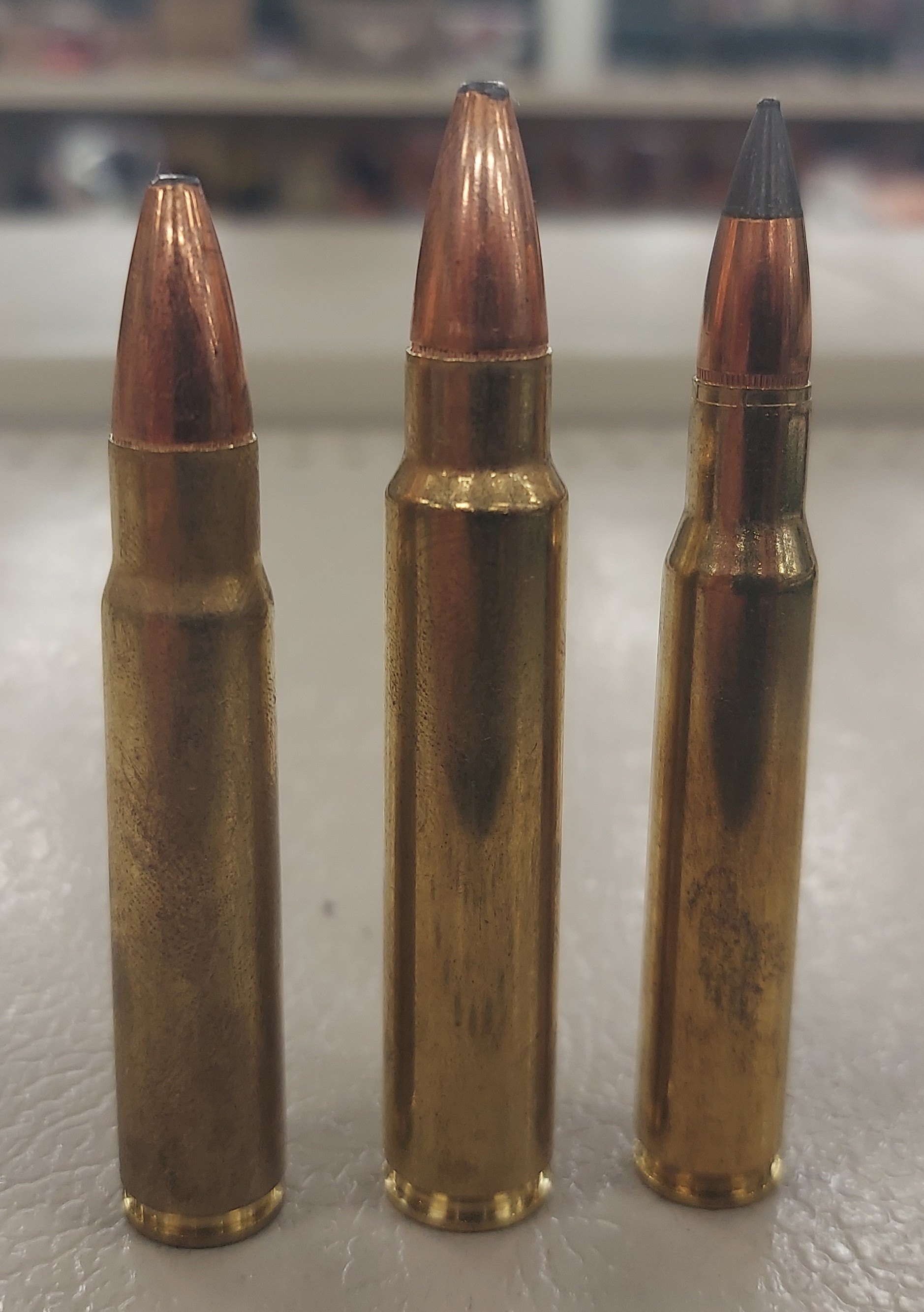
- Left, with .375 Ruger (center) and .30-06 (right)
- Type: Rifle
- Place of origin: Austria/United States

Production history
- Designer: Steyr / Hornady
- Designed: 1999
- Manufacturer: Steyr
- Produced: 1999–present

Specifications
- Parent case: 9.3×64mm Brenneke
- Case type: Rebated, bottleneck
- Bullet diameter: .375 in (9.5 mm)
- Land diameter: .366 in (9.3 mm)
- Neck diameter: .3980 in (10.11 mm)
- Shoulder diameter: .4732 in (12.02 mm)
- Base diameter: .5010 in (12.73 mm)
- Rim diameter: .4940 in (12.55 mm)
- Rim thickness: .0500 in (1.27 mm)
- Case length: 2.3500 in (59.69 mm)
- Overall length: 3.11 in (79.00mm C.I.P.)
- Case capacity: 80 gr H_{2}O (5.2 cm^{3})
- Primer type: Large rifle
- Maximum pressure: 62,366 psi (430.00 MPa)

Ballistic performance
Bullet mass/type	Velocity	Energy
210 gr (14 g) XFB	3,011 ft/s (918 m/s)	4,229 ft⋅lbf (5,734 J)
225 gr (15 g) SP	2,910 ft/s (890 m/s)	4,232 ft⋅lbf (5,738 J)
250 gr (16 g) SP	2,754 ft/s (839 m/s)	4,211 ft⋅lbf (5,709 J)
270 gr (17 g) SP	2,610 ft/s (800 m/s)	4,085 ft⋅lbf (5,539 J)
300 gr (19 g) SP	2,388 ft/s (728 m/s)	3,800 ft⋅lbf (5,200 J)

The .376 Steyr (9.5x59mmRB) cartridge is a rebated rim rifle cartridge jointly developed by Hornady and Steyr for use in the Steyr Scout rifle.

Introduced in 1999, it is based on the 9.3×64mm Brenneke case, necked up to accept a 0.375-inch (9.5 mm) diameter bullet. The case is also shortened by about 4 mm (0.16 in) to fit a standard length rifle action.

It was developed as an evolution of Jeff Cooper's "Super Scout" medium rifle concept, which was in turn an extension of his original scout rifle concept. Cooper used a version of Steyr's Scout rifle chambered in .350 Remington Magnum to hunt large and dangerous game, originally calling it a "Super Scout". After taking a lion at close range with the weapon, he switched to calling that rifle his "Lion Scout".

An additional motivation for development of the new cartridge was that authorities in certain areas of the world dictate a minimum rifle caliber, which may be used for hunting dangerous game, such as cape buffalo and lion. In general the minimum caliber needed is either .366 inch (9.3 mm) or .375 inch (9.5 mm), so that the majority of African countries will accept the newly designed cartridge, it uses a .375 inch (9.5 mm) caliber.

When Steyr initially discussed the new round with Cooper, they intended to call it the .375 Steyr. Cooper said they should instead call it a .376, to avoid confusion with the .375 H&H Magnum.

Cooper subsequently referred to the Scout Rifle in .376 Steyr caliber as the "Dragoon" or "Dragoon Scout," this marking being on the one that Steyr sent him. This designation has been dropped, and is not on production units.

With a higher felt recoil, the .376 Steyr is the largest practical cartridge for use in such a short, lightweight weapon as the Scout.

Steyr Mannlicher has also produced a conventional-style rifle to use this cartridge, dubbed the "Pro Hunter."

== See also ==
- List of rebated rim cartridges
- List of rifle cartridges
- 9 mm caliber list of other cartridges in the 9.0 - 9.9 mm range
