= .375 Remington Ultra Magnum =

Rifle cartridge

- Type: Rifle
- Place of origin: United States

Production history
- Designer: Remington
- Designed: 2000

Specifications
- Parent case: .300 Remington Ultra Magnum
- Case type: Beltless, rebated-rim, bottleneck
- Bullet diameter: .375 in (9.5 mm)
- Neck diameter: .4050 in (10.29 mm)
- Shoulder diameter: .5250 in (13.34 mm)
- Base diameter: .5500 in (13.97 mm)
- Rim diameter: .534 in (13.6 mm)
- Case length: 2.850 in (72.4 mm)
- Overall length: 3.600 in (91.4 mm)
- Rifling twist: 1-12"
- Primer type: Large rifle magnum
- Maximum pressure: 65,000 psi (450 MPa)
- Maximum CUP: < !-- Ballistic performance --> CUP

Ballistic performance
Bullet mass/type	Velocity	Energy
235 gr (15 g) SP	3,148 ft/s (960 m/s)	5,172 ft⋅lbf (7,012 J)
250 gr (16 g) SBT	3,036 ft/s (925 m/s)	5,118 ft⋅lbf (6,939 J)
260 gr (17 g) Partition	2,970 ft/s (910 m/s)	5,094 ft⋅lbf (6,907 J)
270 gr (17 g) SP	2,941 ft/s (896 m/s)	5,187 ft⋅lbf (7,033 J)
300 gr (19 g) RN	2,945 ft/s (898 m/s)	5,760 ft⋅lbf (7,810 J)
- Test barrel length: 26; Source: Alliant Powder

The .375 Remington Ultra Magnum, also known as the .375 RUM is a .375 rifle cartridge introduced by Remington Arms in 2000. The cartridge is intended for large and dangerous game.

It is a beltless, rebated rim cartridge created by necking up the .300 Remington Ultra Magnum case to .375 caliber with no other changes. Factory loadings are less powerful than handloads for the cartridge. Remington factory loads produce 2,760 ft/s (840 m/s) with a 300 grain (19 g) bullet for 5,070 ft·lbf (6.88 kJ) of muzzle energy.

== General information ==
The intended use of this cartridge includes hunting large, thick-skinned game. It is powerful enough to kill any land animal and, with its high velocity, can do so at fairly long ranges. Such performance comes at the price of a heavy recoil: in a sporting-weight rifle of ~8 lb (3.6 kg), this cartridge can produce a fierce 80 ft·lbf (108 J) of recoil (approximately 3.5 times that of a .30-06.)

There is a wide selection of .375 in (9.53 mm) bullets available that are suited to the high velocities of the .375 RUM, and boat tail bullets help to further extend the useful range.

Currently, there are no production rifles in this chambering (Savage & Remington previously did so.) Remington, DoubleTap and Nosler are the only sources of factory ammunition. Loading dies and reloading data are readily available to the handloader. Double Tap loads to the specifications attributed to handloader limits.

== See also ==
- List of rifle cartridges
- 9 mm caliber other cartridges of similar size.
- Table of handgun and rifle cartridges
