= Sling (firearms) =

Strap or harness to hold or carry a firearm

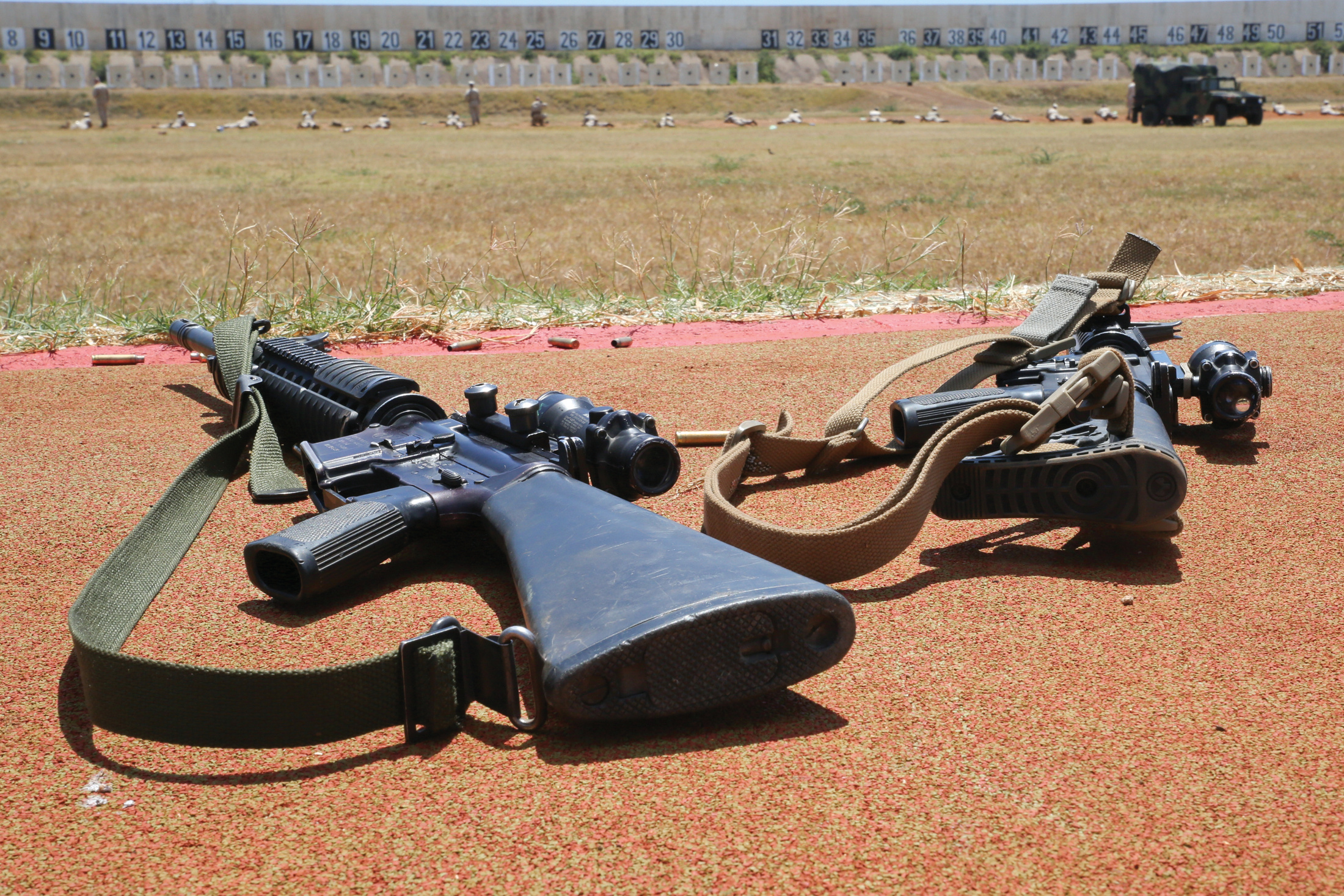
An M16A4 and M4 carbine with different slings. The green sling to the left is a traditional two-point sling, while the tan sling to the right is a modern quick-adjustable two-point sling.

In the context of firearms, a sling is a type of strap or harness designed to allow a shooter to conveniently carry a firearm (usually a long gun such as a rifle, carbine, shotgun, submachine gun or GPMG) on their body, and/or to aid in greater hit probability by allowing the firearm to be better braced and stabilized during aiming. Various types of slings offer their own advantages and disadvantages, and can generally be divided into several categories.

== Types of setup ==
Simple/traditional sling (two-point)
The oldest and most familiar design, this sling design has two connection points that attach to the front and rear of the weapon, and allows the shooter to carry the weapon over their back, with the sling draped across the torso, around the neck or over one shoulder. Some two-point slings, if properly made, can act as a shooting aid.

Ching/CW sling
This type of sling is a component of the Scout Rifle concept, and serves not just as a carrying strap, but as an aid to greater hit probability by helping the shooter aim steadily.

Two-point quick-adjust sling
Similar to a two-point simple sling, but with the capability to quickly adjust the length of the sling with a pull-tab.

Three-point sling
The advantages of the three-point sling are that it functions more like a harness and is therefore strapped to the shooter. This allows the shooter to release the weapon to use their hands for other tasks (such as transitioning to a sidearm) without fear of dropping it on the ground since it will remain hanging from the shooter and easily accessible when needed again. The design of the three-point sling consists of a loop of material (usually cordura or similar) that loops around the torso, and two straps that go to the front and rear of the weapon. The shooter's body and the front and rear of the weapon are the three points that give this design its name.

Single-point sling
A specialized sling design that permits the shooter to transition to firing from the opposite shoulder. Like the three-point sling, the single-point sling permits the shooter to drop the weapon and let it hang downward while still attached to their body. This sling design is best suited for short-term tactical use. A single-point sling is only worn in one way, and cannot provide the same degree of long-term anti-fatigue weight support as other slings. The one great advantage of the single point design is that it is very easy to switch from shoulder to shoulder for weak side barricade shooting. Negative attributes of the single-point sling include a tendency to make the rifle dangle and hang off the shooter in an inconvenient fashion; it can interfere with the shooter's movement and hang up on the shooter's gear.

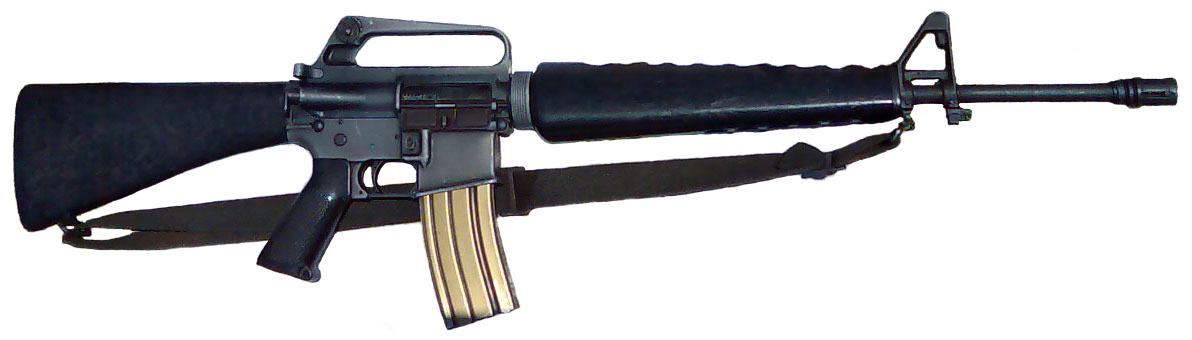
Traditional two-point sling on an M16A1 rifle.

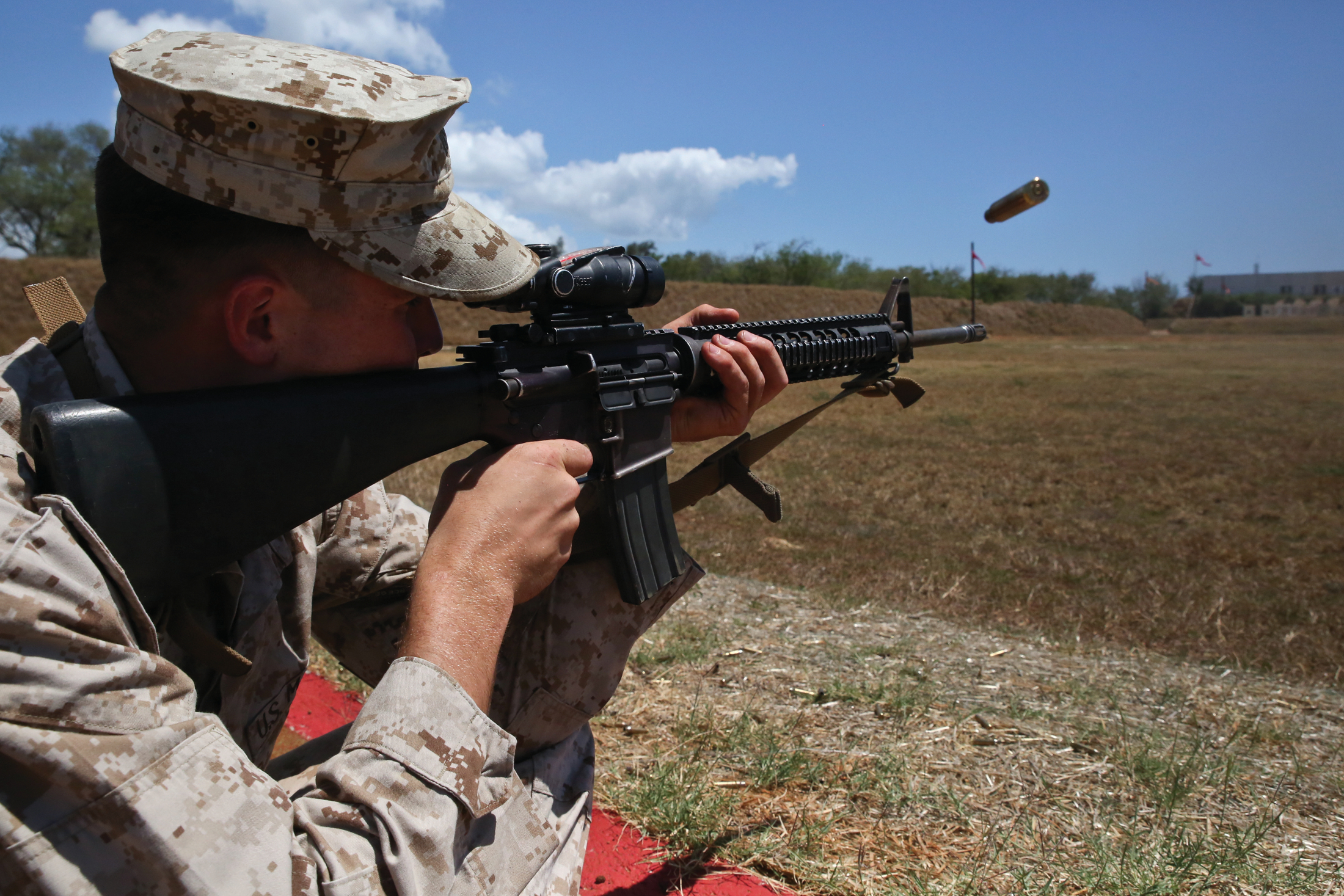
Modern quick-adjust two-point sling on an M16A4 rifle.

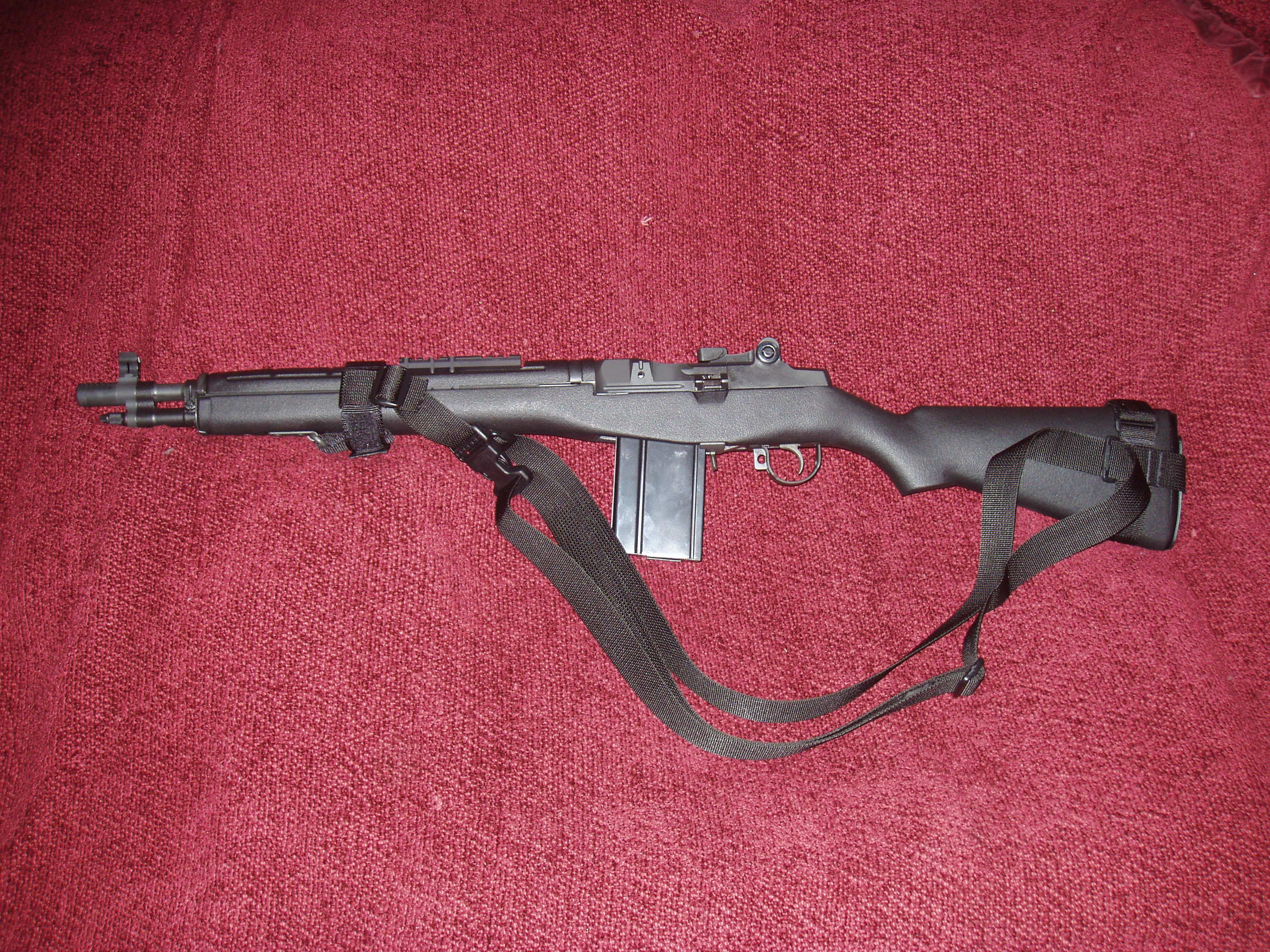
Three-point sling on a Springfield Armory M1A SOCOM 16 rifle.

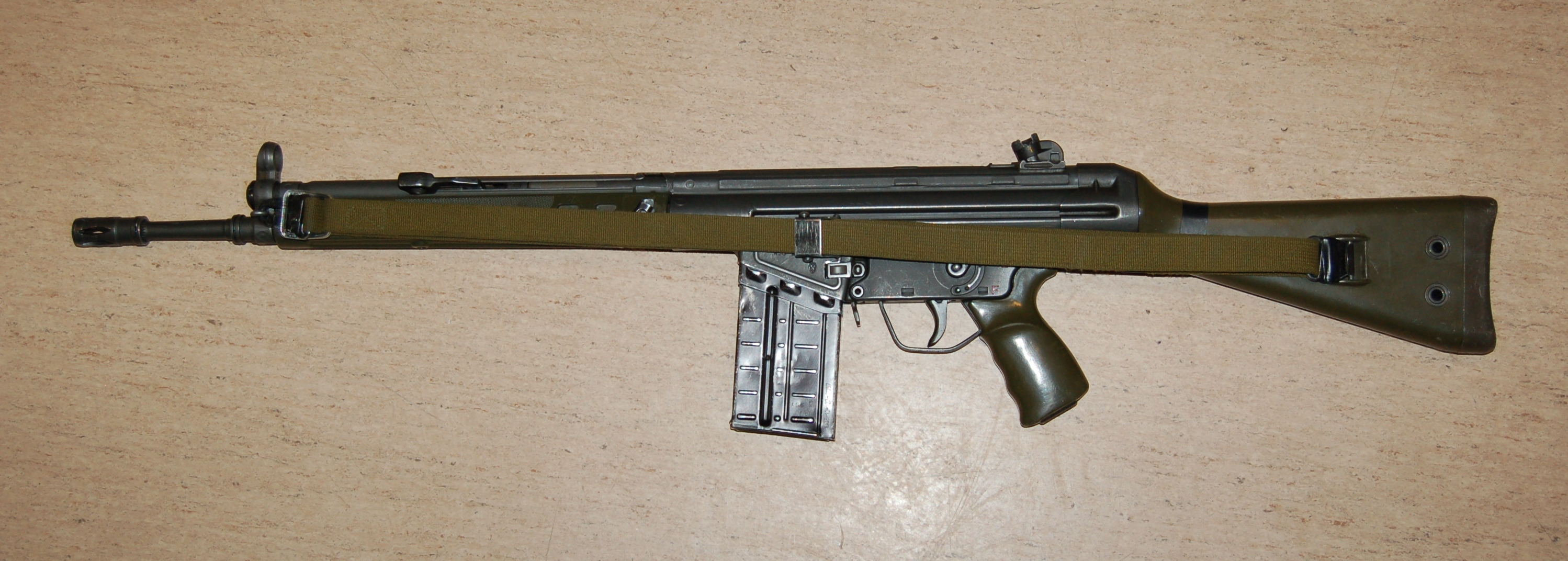
Three-point sling on a Norwegian produced AG-3 rifle.

== Mounting standards ==
There are several mounting standards for attaching a sling to a rifle, of which some well known are sling swivel studs, QD/ Flush Cup or snap hooks (i.e. HK-type snap hook or Magpul Paraclip).

Sling mounts also come in different widths for different webbings. The webbing on American slings are typically 1, 1 1/4 or 1 1/2 inch (25.4, 31.75 or 38.1 mm) wide, while European slings typically are 20 or 30 mm (0.79 or 1.18 in) wide.

=== Sling swivel stud ===
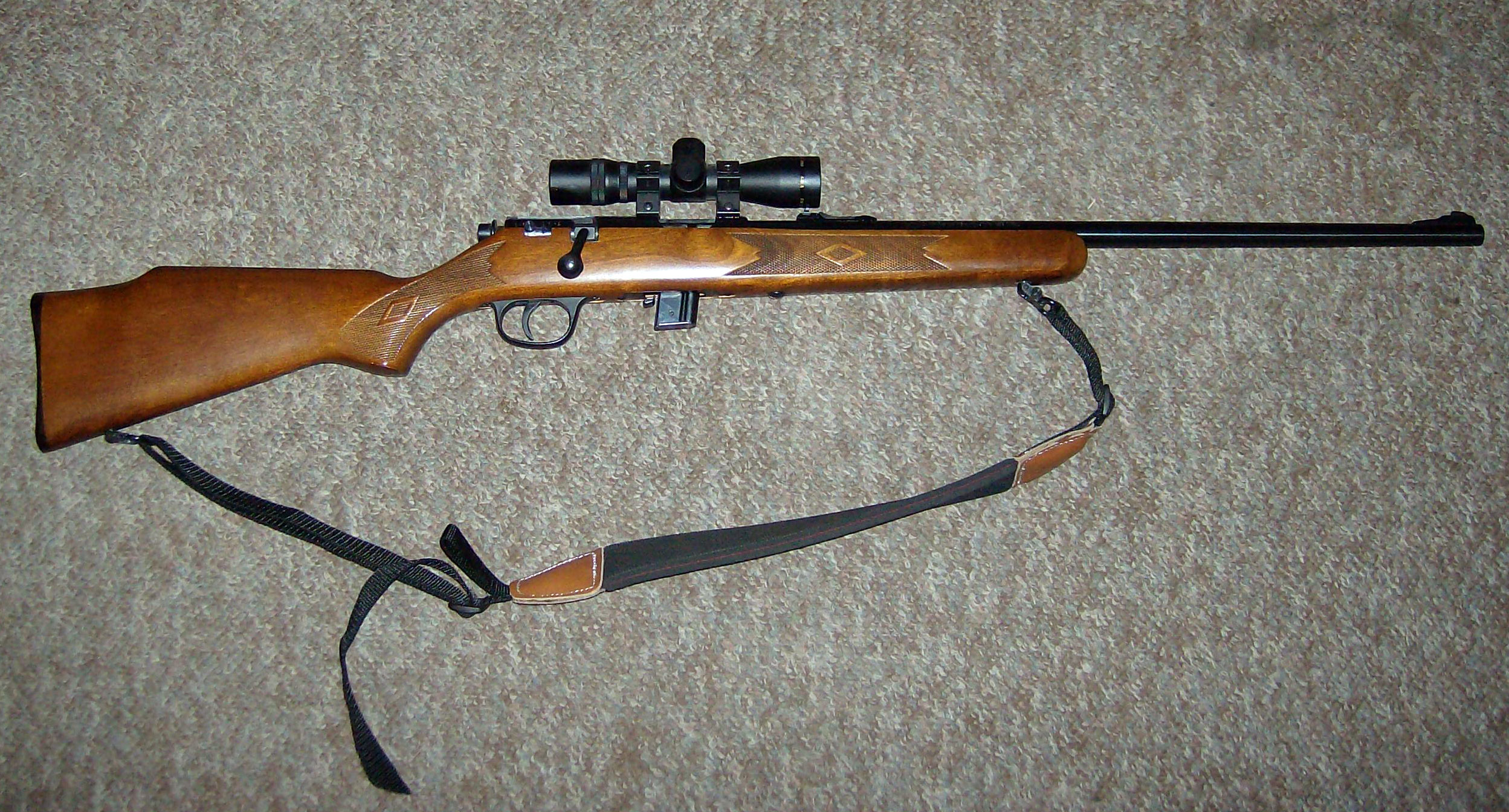
A sling attached to a Marlin 25N rifle by using swivel studs screwed into the wood stock, one near the butt of the rifle and the other attached to the forearm.

A sling swivel stud, sometimes called an "Uncle Mike type swivel" after one of the manufacturers, is one type of sling mounting interface. Sling swivels can be mounted to a long gun in various ways, for instance with wood or machine screws attached to the stock, a barrel band, or by using adapters to other mounting standards such as Picatinny or M-LOK.

Sling swivel studs can vary in dimensions. The widest round part of the stud typically measures around 8.9 mm (0.350 inches), the spacing between the flats measure around 7.6 mm (0.3 inches) and the hole for mounting a sling adapter measures around 3.7 mm (0.145 inches).

=== Quick detach sling mount ===
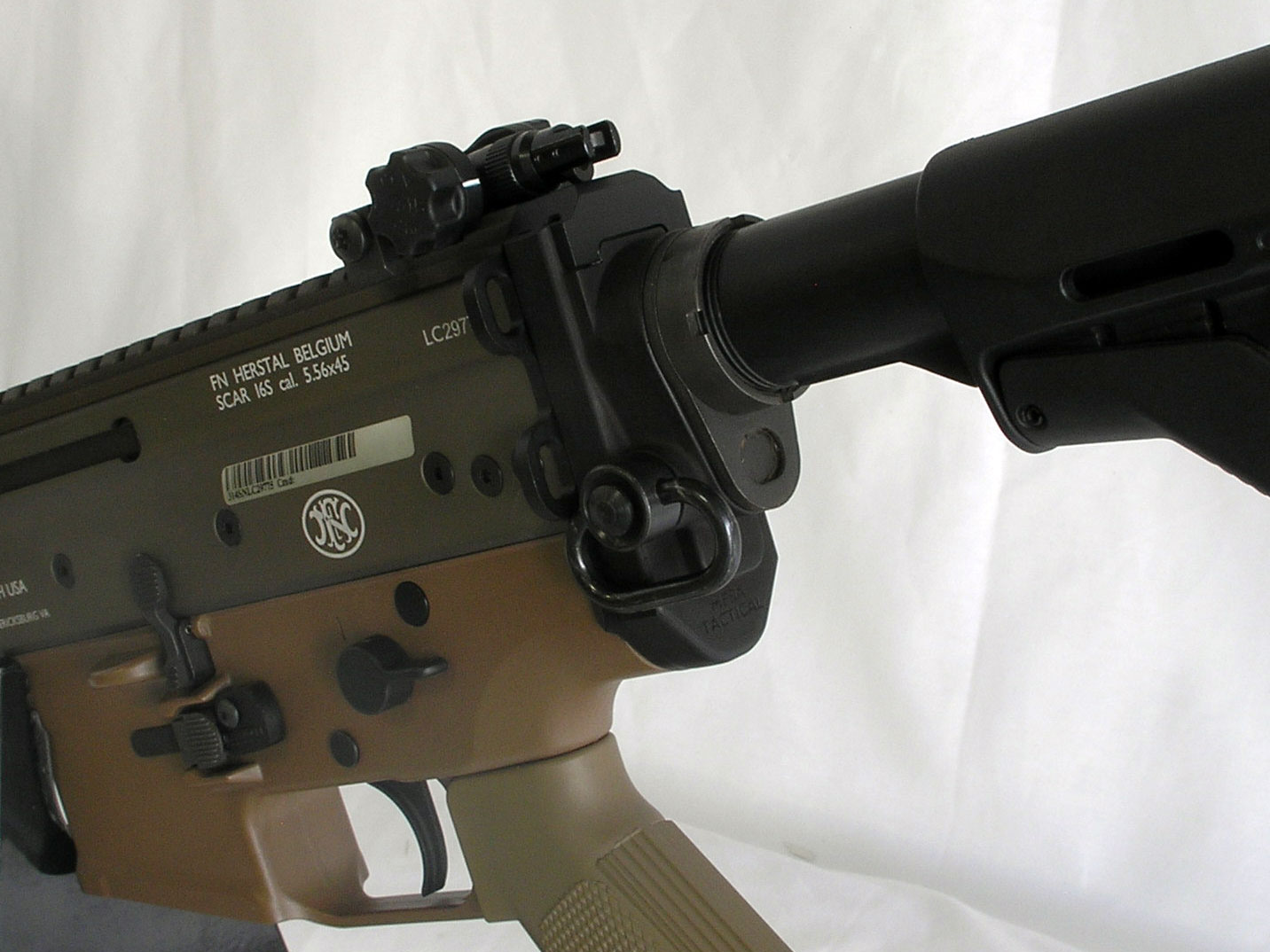
An FN SCAR L with a black push-button QD sling swivel near the butt of the riflestock.

Quick detach sling mounts (QD), also called flush cup sling mounts, is another type of sling mounting interface. "QD sling swivel" usually refers to the part attached to the sling, while "flush cup" refer to the corresponding socket on the firearm.

The system consists of a push button swivel attached to the sling (approximate diameter 9.4 mm, a little under 3/8 inches) which is placed into a mounting socket on the firearm (approximate diameter 9.6 mm, a little over 3/8 inches). The swivel is kept in place by a four ball detents connected to the push button, which presses against the walls of the socket. The sling swivel can quickly be taken on and off by pushing the QD button, which retracts the ball detents. The flush cup sockets can be either rotating or non rotating.

Flush cups can be mounted to a long gun in various ways, for instance by drilling a hole in the stock and screwing in flush cup socket, or by using an adapter to other mounting standards such as Picatinny or M-LOK.

== As a shooting aid ==
A variation of the single point sling is used in precision target rifle shooting from the prone position. The sling is not intended as a carrying aid, but is used to steady the rifle. For a right-handed shooter, the sling attaches to the top of the left arm, and clips onto the forend of the rifle. The left arm is wrapped under the sling. The sling with upper and lower arm form three sides of a triangle that provide a steady support for the rifle.

== Carrying harness ==
A carrying harness usually refers to a type of sling made primarily for carrying the rifle, and not doubling as a shooting support. For example in biathlon, the carrying harness is often a separate item from the shooting sling, with both being attached to the biathlon rifle. The carrying harness is designed to let the biathlete carry the rifle with minimal hindrance, and in such a way increase performance in the ski track. Special carrying harnesses have also been designed for anti-tank rifles, since such rifles often are too heavy for carrying with a normal rifle sling.

== Other examples ==
Various other forms of weapon slings and harnesses have existed, or experimented with for military trials. An example is the affusto d'assalto (assault carriage) that was devised by the 139° e 140° Reggimento Fanteria Brigata "Bari" in 1917 and used on the Villar Perosa aircraft submachine gun. The same concept was later used on the Brixia M1923 machine gun but using the sling in conjunction with a bipod.

== See also ==
- Third Arm Weapon Interface System
- Walking fire
- Weapon mount
