= Jeff Cooper =

American firearms expert (1920–2006)

- Born: May 10, 1920; Los Angeles, California, U.S.
- Died: September 25, 2006 (aged 86); Paulden, Arizona, U.S.
- Education: Stanford University (BA); University of California, Riverside (MA)
- Occupations: U.S. Marine officer, firearms instructor, writer
- Spouse: Janelle Cooper
- Children: 3

John Dean "Jeff" Cooper (May 10, 1920 – September 25, 2006) was a United States Marine Corps officer and firearms instructor. He was the creator of the "modern technique" of handgun shooting, and an expert on the use and history of small arms.

== Early life and education ==
Jeff Cooper was born in Los Angeles where he enrolled in the Junior Reserve Officers' Training Corps at Los Angeles High School. Cooper then enrolled at Stanford University, where he lettered in fencing, and he graduated from Stanford in 1941 with a bachelor's degree in political science. He received a regular commission in the United States Marine Corps (USMC) in September 1941. During World War II he served in the Pacific theater with the Marine Detachment aboard USS Pennsylvania. By the end of the war he had been promoted to major. He resigned his commission in 1949 but returned to active duty during the Korean War, where he claimed to be involved in irregular warfare in Southeast Asia, and was promoted to lieutenant colonel. After the Korean War he left active duty. In the mid-1960s he received a master's degree in history from the University of California, Riverside. From the late 1950s through the early 1970s he was a part-time high school and community college history teacher.

== Career ==
In 1976 Cooper founded the American Pistol Institute (API) in Paulden, Arizona (later the Gunsite Academy). Cooper began teaching pistol, shotgun and rifle classes to both law enforcement and military personnel, as well as civilians, and conducted on-site training for individuals and groups from around the world. He sold the firm in 1992 but continued living on the Paulden ranch. He was known for his advocacy of large-caliber handguns, especially the Colt 1911 and the .45 ACP cartridge.

Cooper, along with Michael Dixon and Thomas Dornaus, worked on the design of the Bren Ten pistol around the 10mm Auto, based on the Czech CZ 75 design. The cartridge was larger than 9×19mm Parabellum and faster than .45 ACP rounds.

=== The modern technique of the pistol ===
Cooper's modern technique defines pragmatic use of the pistol for personal protection. The modern technique emphasizes two-handed shooting using the Weaver stance. The five elements of the modern technique are:

- A large caliber pistol, preferably a semi-automatic
- The Weaver stance
- The draw stroke
- The flash sight picture
- The compressed surprise trigger break

==== Firearm conditions of readiness ====
There are several conditions of readiness in which such a weapon can be carried. Cooper promulgated most of the following terms:

- Clear and Safe: Slide locked to the rear, chamber empty, no magazine in the gun.
- Condition 4: Chamber empty, no magazine in the gun, hammer down.
- Condition 3: Chamber empty, full magazine in place, hammer down.
- Condition 2: A round chambered, full magazine in place, hammer down.
- Condition 1: A round chambered, full magazine in place, hammer cocked, safety on. Also referred to as "cocked and locked."
- Condition 0: A round chambered, full magazine in place, hammer cocked, safety off.

Condition 0 is considered "ready to fire"; as a result, there is a risk of accidental or negligent discharge carrying in Condition 0.

=== Combat mindset and the Cooper color code ===
The most important means of surviving a lethal confrontation, according to Cooper, is neither the weapon nor the martial skills. The primary tool is the combat mindset, set forth in his book, Principles of Personal Defense.

Cooper came up with a color code, consisting of four colors including white, yellow, orange, and red:

In White you are unprepared and unready to take lethal action. If you are attacked in White you will probably die unless your adversary is totally inept.

In Yellow you bring yourself to the understanding that your life may be in danger and that you may have to do something about it.

In Orange you have determined upon a specific adversary and are prepared to take action which may result in his death, but you are not in a lethal mode.

In Red you are in a lethal mode and will shoot if circumstances warrant.

The color code, as originally introduced by Cooper, had nothing to do with tactical situations or alertness levels, but rather with one's state of mind. Cooper did not claim to have invented anything in particular with the color code, but he was apparently the first to use it as an indication of mental state.

The USMC uses "Condition Black," although it was not originally part of Cooper's color code. According to Massad Ayoob, "Condition Black," in Cooper's youth, meant "combat in progress." "Condition Black" is also used to mean "immobilized by panic" or "overwhelmed by fear".

=== Rifle concepts ===
Cooper is best known for his work in pistol training, but he favored the rifle for tactical shooting. He often described the handgun as a convenient-to-carry stopgap weapon, allowing someone the opportunity to get to a rifle:

Personal weapons are what raised mankind out of the mud, and the rifle is the queen of personal weapons.

The rifle is a weapon. Let there be no mistake about that. It is a tool of power, and thus dependent completely upon the moral stature of its user. It is equally useful in securing meat for the table, destroying group enemies on the battlefield, and resisting tyranny. In fact, it is the only means of resisting tyranny, since a citizenry armed with rifles simply cannot be tyrannized.

The rifle itself has no moral stature, since it has no will of its own. Naturally, it may be used by evil men for evil purposes, but there are more good men than evil, and while the latter cannot be persuaded to the path of righteousness by propaganda, they can certainly be corrected by good men with rifles.

— Jeff Cooper, The Art of the Rifle

==== Scout rifle ====
Greatly influenced by the life and writings of Frederick Russell Burnham, Cooper published an article in the 1980s describing his ideal of a general-purpose rifle: "a short, light, handy, versatile, utility rifle", which he dubbed a scout rifle. This was a bolt-action carbine chambered in .308 Winchester, less than 1 meter in length, less than 3 kilograms in weight, with iron sights, a forward-mounted optical sight (long eye relief scope), and fitted with a practical sling. Cooper defined his goal: a general-purpose rifle is a conveniently portable, individually operated firearm, capable of striking a single decisive blow on a live target of up to 200 kilos in weight at any distance at which the operator can shoot with the precision necessary to place a shot in a vital area of the target. Cooper felt the scout rifle should be suited to a man operating like the scout Burnham, either alone or in a two- or three-man team.

In late 1997, with Cooper's oversight, Steyr Mannlicher produced a rifle to his "scout" specifications. Cooper considered the Steyr Scout "perfect." Riflemen regard Cooper's development of the scout rifle concept and his subsequent work on the evolution of the Steyr-Mannlicher Scout rifle as his most significant and enduring contributions to riflecraft. Ruger (Gunsite Scout Rifle), Savage Arms, Springfield Armory, and Mossberg have made versions of the scout rifle as well.

=== Ammunition concepts ===
Cooper was dissatisfied with the small-diameter 5.56×45mm NATO (.223 Remington) of the AR-15 and envisioned a need for a large-bore (.44 caliber or greater) cartridge in a semi-automatic rifle to provide increased stopping power and one-shot kills on big-game animals at 250 yards. The so-called Thumper concept inspired the development of the .450 Bushmaster, .458 SOCOM, .458 HAM'R, .499 LWR, and the .50 Beowulf, among other cartridges, all suitable for integration into the AR-15/M16 rifle/M4 carbine or AR-10/M14 rifle platforms.

Along the lines of the Thumper concept, Tim LeGendre of LeMag Firearms developed .45 Professional, the predecessor of the .450 Bushmaster cartridge, and later built and delivered an AR-15 in .45 Professional to Cooper.

=== Writing ===
In 1997, Cooper wrote that he coined the term hoplophobia in 1962 in response to "a perceived need for a word to describe a mental aberration consisting of an unreasoning terror of gadgetry, specifically, weapons."

In addition to his books on firearms and self-defense, Cooper wrote several books recounting his life adventures plus essays and short stories, including Fire Works (1980); Another Country: Personal Adventures of the Twentieth Century (1992); To Ride, Shoot Straight and Speak the Truth (1988); and C Stories (2004). His daughter Lindy Wisdom published a biography, Jeff Cooper: the Soul and the Spirit (1996).

Some of the comments from his "Gunsite Gossip" newsletter were printed in Guns & Ammo magazine as "Cooper's Corner" and later were compiled into The Gargantuan Gunsite Gossip. These were his thoughts on firearms interleaved with his wide-ranging musings on many other subjects and acquired a large U.S. and international following from the 1980s up to his death. Cooper wrote extensively in defense of firearms rights.

A complete bibliography of Cooper's writings from 1947 onwards is available at the Jeff Cooper Bibliography Project.

== Personal life ==
Cooper was married to his wife Janelle for 64 years. They had three daughters. He died at his home on September 25, 2006, at the age of 86. He and Janelle are buried at the Arizona Pioneer's Home Cemetery in Prescott, Arizona.

== Political views ==
In 1991, Cooper wrote in Guns & Ammo magazine that "no more than five to ten people in a hundred who die by gunfire in Los Angeles are any loss to society. These people fight small wars amongst themselves. It would seem a valid social service to keep them well-supplied with ammunition." In 1994, Cooper said "Los Angeles and Ho Chi Minh City have declared themselves sister cities. It makes sense: they are both Third World metropolises formerly occupied by Americans."

== See also ==
- Handgun hunting
- Jack Weaver
- Mel Tappan
- Self-defense
- Thell Reed
