= Gunsite Academy =

Firearms training facility in Arizona

Gunsite is a privately run firearms training facility based in Yavapai County, Arizona, just south-west of Paulden in the United States. It offers tuition-based instruction in handgun, carbine, rifle and shotgun shooting. Located on a 3,000-acre (12 km^{2}) facility, Gunsite has classrooms, indoor and outdoor firing simulators, and various pistol and long-barrel ranges. The ranges go out to 2000 yards for precision rifle training. There is also an on-site pro shop and gunsmith.

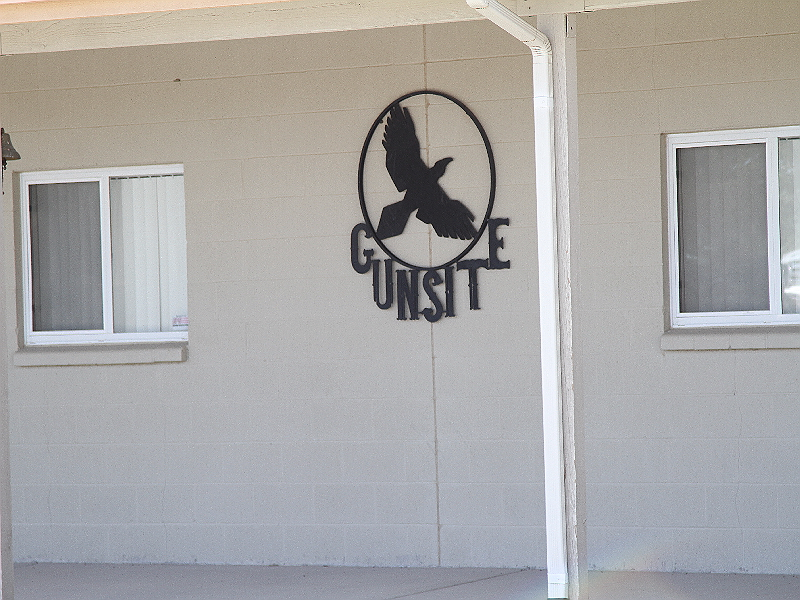
The GunSite Raven

== History of American Pistol Institute ==
=== American Pistol Institute (1976–1992) ===
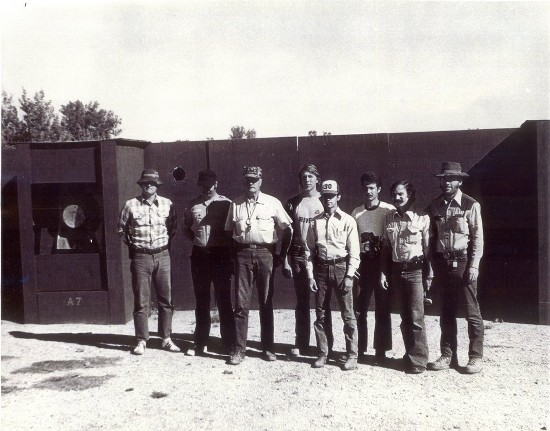
Gunsite Ranch First Class September 1976. Bill Garland, Bruce Nelson, Jeff Cooper, Ronin Colman, Paul Carrara, Charles Avery, Israeli Guy, Dick Brooks

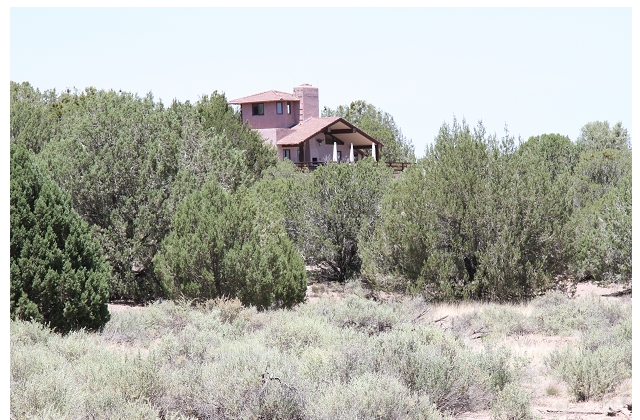
Cooper house near Gunsite headquarters.

Gunsite was founded by Jeff Cooper as the American Pistol Institute (API) in 1976 in order to teach the modern technique of shooting. The modern technique is a method of use of the handgun for self-defense. The technique uses a two-handed grip of the pistol, which brings the pistol to eye-level, so that the sights may be used to aim the pistol at one's assailant. Prior to the founding of API, Cooper had traveled the world providing training in the modern technique to security teams such as those protecting heads of state, prominent politicians and wealthy individuals. The facilities at Gunsite allowed Cooper to teach the technique to a much wider audience. At that time the firearms training school industry did not exist.

Cooper developed similar doctrines in the use of the rifle and shotgun and these courses were also taught at Gunsite. These included the basic rifle course as well as courses designed for those hunting dangerous game, Cooper being a keen hunter himself. After the introduction of the rifle and shotgun courses, the school's name was changed to Gunsite Training Center.

From the beginning, the objective of Gunsite was firearms education. Originally, the courses at Gunsite were numbered (250, 270, 499) because they were assigned units by the University of Phoenix as part of their program. Over the years increasingly advanced and complex courses were offered (with correspondingly higher numbers) for those taking study of the use of firearms to higher levels. Cooper named a number of individuals as "Shooting Masters."

=== Gunsite Training Center (1992–1999) ===
In 1992 Cooper sold the American Pistol Institute. Under the new owner the instruction shifted away from modern technique as taught by Cooper, both in content and quality and the school was not well regarded. Cooper dissociated himself from the school. During this time Cooper held classes occasionally at the National Rifle Association of America's Whittington Center in New Mexico and other locations.

To distinguish between the two schools, graduates of the American Pistol Institute as it was owned by Cooper pre-1992 refer to this institution as "Orange Gunsite" and to the subsequent operation post-1992 as "Grey Gunsite". This is because when Cooper sold the school its color scheme was changed from orange to grey.

=== Gunsite Academy (1999–present) ===
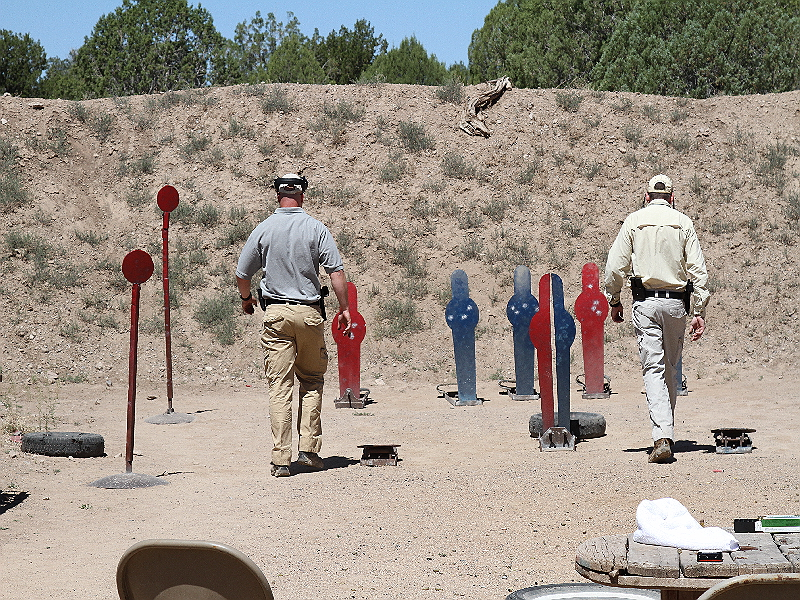
Industry and media representatives checking out new pistols on pistol range 2

On December 10, 1999, the school was sold to a new owner, Buz Mills, himself a graduate of Orange Gunsite, whereupon it was renamed "Gunsite Academy". The instruction at the school returned to that of the modern technique as taught by Cooper. Cooper once more associated himself with the school and took part in the instruction of the classes until his retirement from instruction at the end of 2003. Furthermore, a number of instructors who had been instructors under Cooper at Orange Gunsite returned to instruct at the school.

== Ruger Gunsite Scout Rifle (2011) ==
Working closely with Sturm, Ruger in the development of the Ruger Gunsite Scout Rifle which is based on the company's Model 77 and meeting the criteria of the modern scout rifle set forth by Cooper. The rifle is chambered in .308 Winchester and weighs 7 lbs and sports a 16.5" barrel and black laminate stock. It features ghost-ring iron sights, flash hider and a picatinny rail for optics mounting.

== See also ==
- Combat pistol shooting
- Shooting range
- Shooting sports
