= Daniel Horner =

American sport shooter

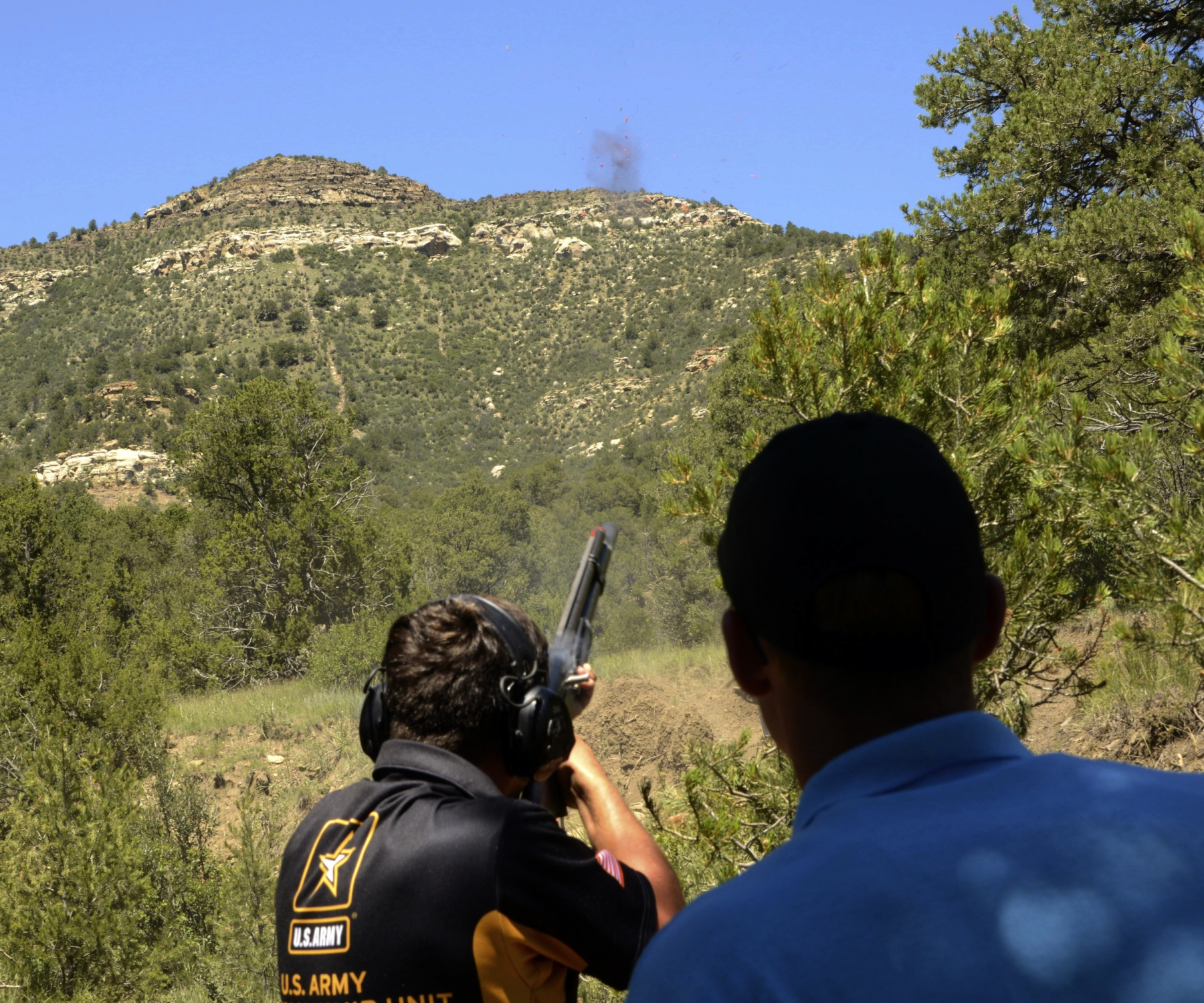
- Daniel Horner firing his shotgun at a match in South Carolina, 2017.

Personal information
- Nationality: (United States) American
- Born: January 24, 1987 (age 39)
- Occupation(s): Professional shooter, firearms instructor
- Website: danielhorner.com

Sport
- Team: Team SIG Sauer (2018-current); US Army Marksmanship Unit (2005-2018)

Daniel Horner is an American sport shooter and firearms instructor who placed fourth in the Production division at the 2008 IPSC Handgun World Shoot. He shoots varied action shooting competitions with an emphasis on multigun, and is a 10-time USPSA Multigun Champion in the Tactical division (2007, 2009, 2010, 2011, 2012, 2014, 2015, 2016, 2017 and 2018). Horner competed for the U.S. Army Marksmanship Unit from 2005 to 2018, when he joined Team SIG Sauer.

== Merits ==
- 10-time USPSA Multigun Champion
- 4-time 3-Gun Nation Pro Series Champion
- 2014 NRA World Shooting Champion (event sponsored by Trijicon, dubbed the 'Trijicon World Shooting Championship')
- 4th place overall in the Production division at the 2008 IPSC Handgun World Shoot
- 6th place in Open division at the 2009 IPSC European Rifle Championship
- IPSC Shotgun National Champion
- 2-time IDPA U.S. Champion
- 1st Place Team 2014 USASOC International Sniper Competition (with partner Tyler Payne)
- 1st Place Team 2012 International Sniper Competition (with partner Tyler Payne)
- 4-time Winner of Mammoth Sniper Competition (2012–2015, 3 times with Tyler Payne, 1 time with Candice Horner)

== See also ==
- Jerry Miculek, professional shooter
- Max Michel, professional shooter
- Josh Froelich, American sport shooter
