= Thell =

Thell may refer to:

- Thell Reed (fl. 1950s–2000s), American exhibition shooter
- Victor Thell (fl. 2010s–2020s), musician in the Swedish pop/folk duo Smith & Thell
- Thell., taxonomic author abbreviation of Albert Thellung (1881–1928), Swiss botanist
