= USPSA Multigun Championship =

Annual US shooting competition

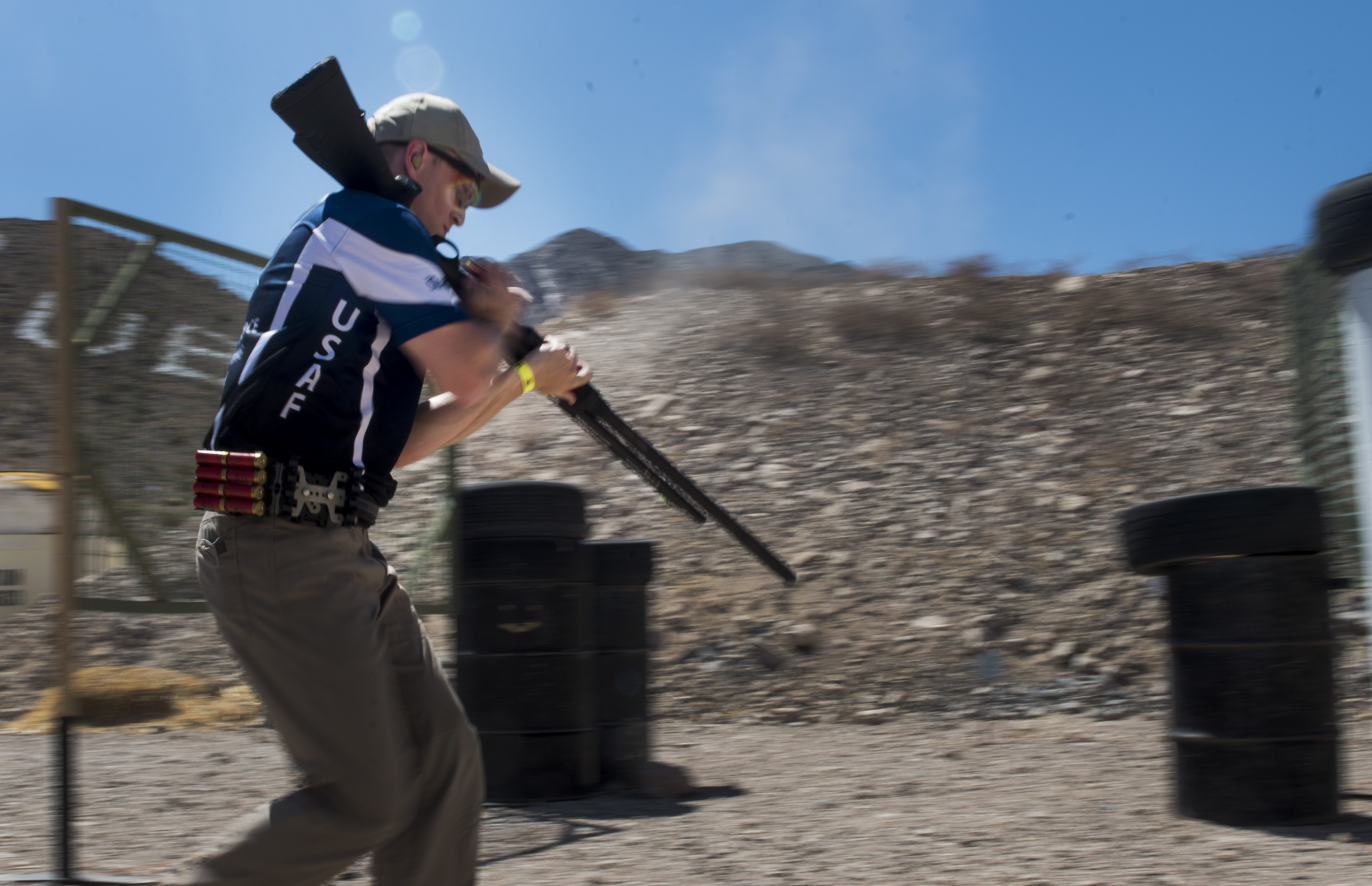
A competitor reloads a shotgun during the 2018 USPSA Multigun Championship in Boulder City, Nevada.

The USPSA Multigun Championship, formerly called the 3-Gun Nationals, are yearly multigun championships held by the United States Practical Shooting Association (USPSA). The Multigun Championship is always held at a separate range and date from the pistol nationals USPSA Handgun Championship and IPSC US Handgun Championship. Currently, anyone can participate in the Multigun Championship on a first-come, first-served basis.

== History ==
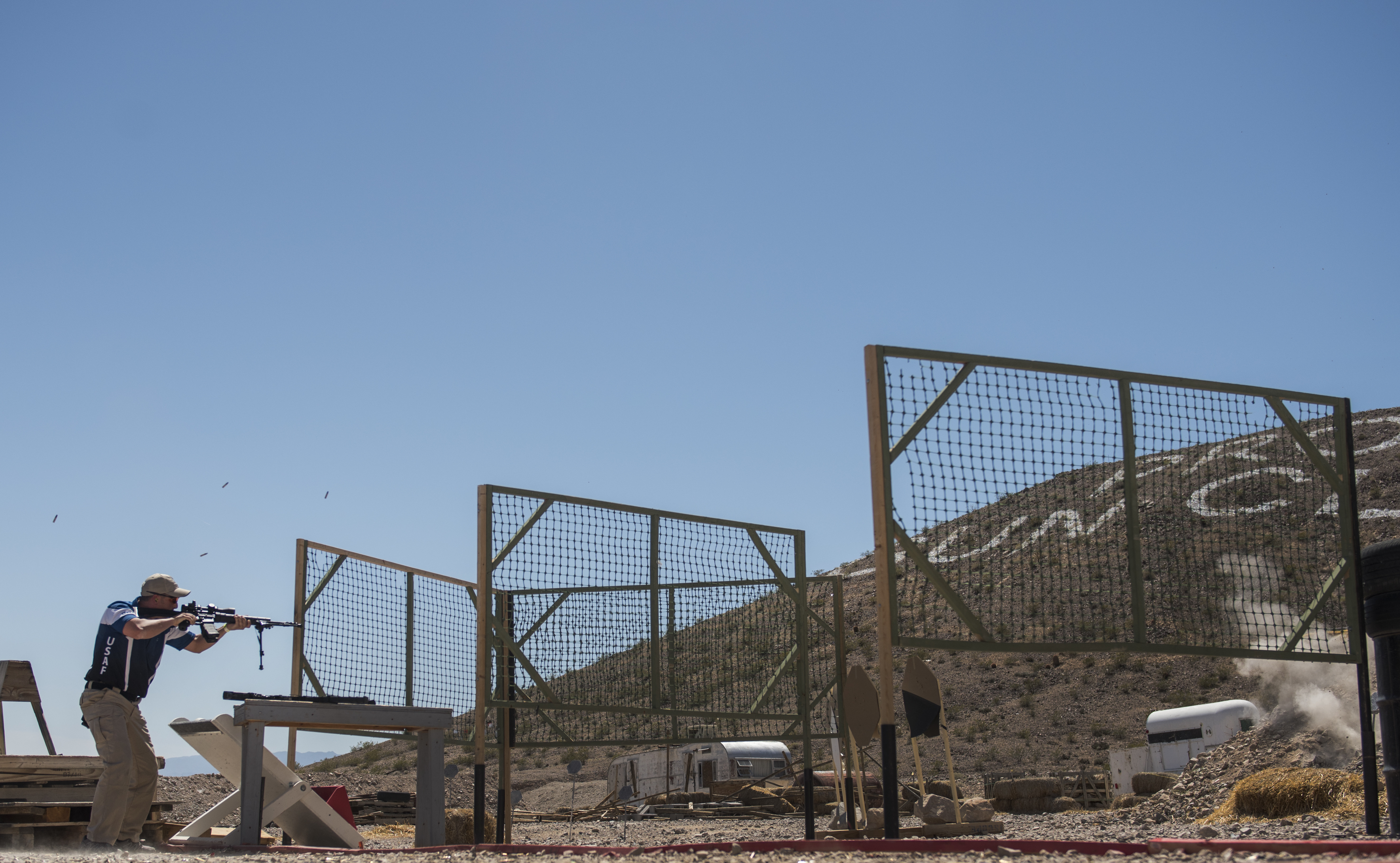
A competitor during a rifle stage at the 2018 USPSA Multigun Championship.

The inaugural USPSA Multigun Championship was held in 1990 at the Pike-Adams Sportsmen's Alliance (PASA) in Barry, Illinois.

List of championships

- 1990 Pike-Adams Sportsmen's Alliance (PASA) in Barry, Illinois
- 1991
- 1992
- 1993
- 1994
- 1995
- 1996
- 1997
- 1998
- 1999
- 2000
- 2001
- 2002
- 2003
- 2004 September, Pike-Adams Sportsmen's Alliance (PASA) in Barry, Illinois
- 2005
- 2006 July 27–30, Bend Albany, Oregon
- 2007 October 4–7, U.S. Shooting Academy (USSA) in Tulsa, Oklahoma
- 2008 October 3–5, Princeton, Louisiana
- 2009 October 22–25 Boulder City, Nevada
- 2010 September 10–12, Las Vegas, Nevada
- 2011 October 20–23, Las Vegas, Nevada
- 2012 April 11–15, Las Vegas, Nevada
- 2013 April 24, Las Vegas, Nevada
- 2014 April 17–20, Las Vegas, Nevada
- 2015 April 24–26, Las Vegas, Nevada
- 2016 April 13–17, Las Vegas, Nevada
- 2017 April 14–16, Boulder City, Nevada
- 2018 April 18–22, Boulder City, Nevada
- 2019 April 3–7, Universal Shooting Academy in Frostproof, Florida.
- 2020 June, Universal Shooting Academy in Frostproof, Florida.
- 2022 March, Clinton House range in Clinton, South Carolina.

== Champions ==
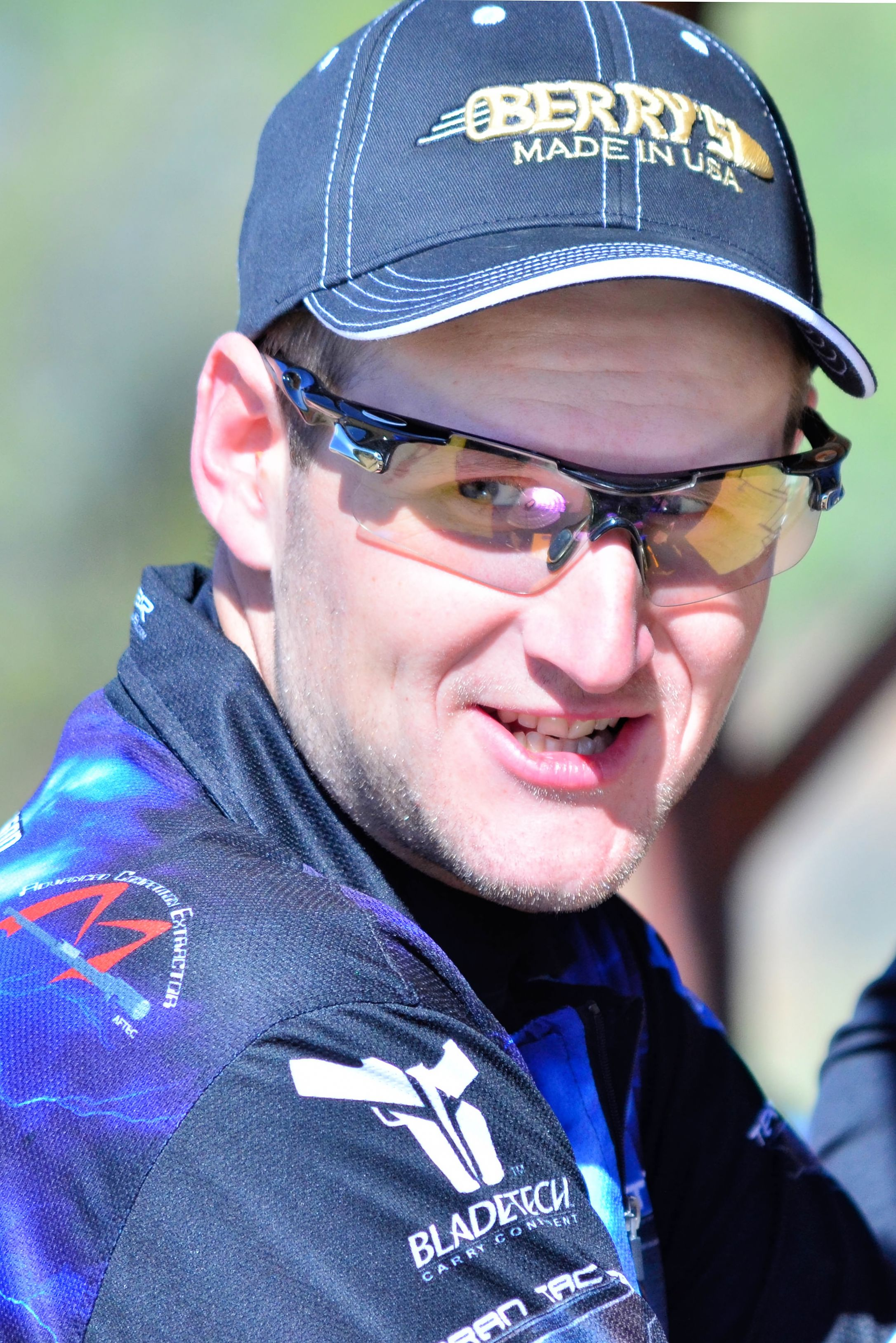
Nils Jonasson, 2013 Tactical division gold winner and two time silver medalist (2015 and 2016).

The following is a list of current and past USPSA Multigun Champions.

=== Overall category ===
Year	Division	Gold	Silver	Bronze	Venue
1990		(United States)	(United States)	(United States)	Barry, Illinois
1991		(United States)	(United States)	(United States)	
1992		(United States)	(United States)	(United States)	
1993		(United States)	(United States)	(United States)	
1994		(United States)	(United States)	(United States)	
1995	Open	(United States)	(United States)	(United States)	
1995	Limited	(United States) Bruce Piatt	(United States)	(United States)	
1996	Open	(United States)	(United States)	(United States)	
1996	Limited	(United States)	(United States)	(United States)	
1997	Open	(United States)	(United States)	(United States)	
1997	Limited	(United States)	(United States)	(United States)	
1998	Open	(United States)	(United States)	(United States)	
1998	Limited	(United States)	(United States)	(United States)	
1999	Open	(United States)	(United States)	(United States)	
1999	Limited	(United States)	(United States)	(United States)	
2000	Open	(United States)	(United States)	(United States)	
2000	Limited	(United States)	(United States)	(United States)	
2001	Open	(United States) Michael Voigt	(United States)	(United States)	
2001	Limited	(United States) Bennie Cooley	(United States)	(United States)	
2002	Open	(United States) Michael Voigt	(United States)	(United States)	
2002	Limited	(United States) Bennie Cooley	(United States)	(United States)	
2003	Open	(United States) Jerry Miculek	(United States)	(United States)	
2003	Limited	(United States) Taran Butler	(United States)	(United States)	
2004	Open	(United States) Michael Voigt	(United States)	(United States)	Barry, Illinois
2004	Limited	(United States) Bennie Cooley	(United States)	(United States)	Barry, Illinois
2004	Tactical	(United States) Taran Butler	(United States)	(United States)	Barry, Illinois
2005	Open	(United States) Jerry Miculek	(United States)	(United States)	
2005	Limited	(United States) Kelly Neal	(United States)	(United States)	
2005	Tactical	(United States) Taran Butler	(United States)	(United States)	
2006	Open	(United States) Michael Voigt	(United States)	(United States)	Bend, Oregon
2006	Limited	(United States) Ted Puente	(United States)	(United States)	Bend, Oregon
2006	Tactical	(United States) Taran Butler	(United States)	(United States)	Bend, Oregon
2007	Open	(United States) Jerry Miculek	(United States)	(United States)	Tulsa, Oklahoma
2007	Limited	(United States) Ted Puente	(United States)	(United States)	Tulsa, Oklahoma
2007	Tactical	(United States) Daniel Horner	(United States)	(United States)	Tulsa, Oklahoma
2008	Open	(United States) Jerry Miculek	(United States)	(United States)	Princeton, Louisiana
2008	Limited	(United States) Bruce Piatt	(United States)	(United States)	Princeton, Louisiana
2008	Tactical	(United States) Taran Butler	(United States)	(United States)	Princeton, Louisiana
2009	Open	(United States) Michael Voigt	(United States)	(United States)	
2009	Tactical	(United States) Daniel Horner	(United States)	(United States)	
2010	Open	(United States) Jerry Miculek	(United States)	(United States)	Las Vegas, Nevada
2010	Tactical	(United States) Daniel Horner	(United States)	(United States)	Las Vegas, Nevada
2011	Open	(United States) Michael Voigt	(United States)	(United States)	Las Vegas, Nevada
2011	Limited	(United States) Kurt Miller	(United States)	(United States)	Las Vegas, Nevada
2011	Tactical	(United States) Daniel Horner	(United States)	(United States)	Las Vegas, Nevada
2012	Open	(United States) Taran Butler	(United States)	(United States)	Las Vegas, Nevada
2012	Limited	(United States) Chris Sechiatano	(United States)	(United States)	Las Vegas, Nevada
2012	Tactical	(United States) Daniel Horner	(United States)	(United States)	Las Vegas, Nevada
2013	Open	(United States) Michael Voigt	(United States)	(United States)	Las Vegas, Nevada
2013	Limited	(United States) Chris Sechiatano	(United States)	(United States)	Las Vegas, Nevada
2013	Tactical	(United States) Nils Jonasson	(United States)	(United States)	Las Vegas, Nevada
2014	Open	(United States) Taran Butler	(United States)	(United States)	Las Vegas, Nevada
2014	Limited	(United States) James Casanova	(United States)	(United States)	Las Vegas, Nevada
2014	Tactical	(United States) Daniel Horner	(United States)	(United States)	Las Vegas, Nevada
2015	Open	(United States) Jerry Miculek	(United States) Travis Gibson	(United States) Naim Saiti	Las Vegas, Nevada
2015	Limited	(United States) Joel Turner	(United States) Patrick E Kelley	(United States) Cody Leeper	Las Vegas, Nevada
2015	Tactical	(United States) Daniel Horner	(United States) Nils Jonasson	(United States) Brian Nelson	Las Vegas, Nevada
2015	Heavy Metal Limited	(United States) Jeff Gross	(United States) Jj Johnson	(United States) Jason Stieber	Las Vegas, Nevada
2015	Heavy Metal Tactical	(United States) Keith Garcia	(United States) Tyler Payne	(United States) Barry Dueck	Las Vegas, Nevada
2016	Open	(United States) Jerry Miculek	(United States) Kalani Laker	(United States) Naim Saiti	Las Vegas, Nevada
2016	Tactical	(United States) Daniel Horner	(United States) Nils Jonasson	(United States) Todd Jarrett	Las Vegas, Nevada
2016	Limited	(United States) Cody Leeper	(United States) Joel Turner	(United States) Kurt Miller	Las Vegas, Nevada
2016	Heavy Metal Tactical	(United States) Tyler Payne	(United States) Barry Dueck	(United States) Jeremy Reid	Las Vegas, Nevada
2017	Open	(United States) Jerry Miculek	(United States) Joel Turner	(United States) Wyatt Gibson	Boulder City, Nevada
2017	Tactical	(United States) Daniel Horner	(United States) Keith Garcia	(United States) Todd Jarrett	Boulder City, Nevada
2017	Limited	(United States) Rick Birdsall	(United States) John Browning	(United States) Max Leograndis	Boulder City, Nevada
2017	Heavy Metal Tactical	(United States) Tyler Payne	(United States) Barry Dueck	(United States) Patrick Kelly	Boulder City, Nevada
2018	Open	(United States) Scott Greene	(United States) Joel Turner	(United States) Josh Froelich	Boulder City, Nevada
2018	Tactical	(United States) Daniel Horner	(United States) Tim Yackley	(United States) Todd Jarrett	Boulder City, Nevada
2018	Limited	(United States) Nate Staskiewicz	(United States) Max Leograndis	(United States) Rick Birdsall	Boulder City, Nevada
2018	Heavy Metal Tactical	(United States) Tyler Payne	(United States) Barry Dueck	(United States) Scott Mcgregor	Boulder City, Nevada
2019	Open	(United States) Scott Greene	(United States) Jerry Miculek	(United States) Josh Froelich	Frostproof, Florida
2019	Tactical	(United States) Daniel Horner	(United States) Tim Yackley	(United States) Nate Staskiewicz	Frostproof, Florida
2019	Limited	(United States) Riley Kropff	(United States) Jacob H	(United States) Mason Lane	Frostproof, Florida
2020	Open	(United States) Joel Turner	(United States) Scott Greene	(United States) Tucker Schmidt	Frostproof, Florida
2020	Tactical	(United States) Daniel Horner	(United States) Nate Staskiewicz	(United States) Tim Yackley	Frostproof, Florida
2020	Limited	(United States) Joe Easter	(United States) Houston Russell	(United States) Bennie Cooley	Frostproof, Florida
2022	Open	(United States) Jon Wiedell	(United States) Joshua Froelich	(United States) Scott Greene	Clinton, South Carolina
2022	Tactical	(United States) Nate Staskiewicz	(United States) Daniel Horner	(United States) Jacob Hetherington	Clinton, South Carolina
2022	Limited	(United States) Houston Russell	(United States) Konnor Fryburger	(United States) Adam Maxwell	Clinton, South Carolina

=== Lady category ===
Year	Division	Gold	Silver	Bronze	Venue
2001	Open	(United States) Kay Miculek	(United States)	(United States)	
2001	Limited	(United States) Cheryl Current	(United States)	(United States)	
2002	Open	(United States) Debora Cheek	(United States)	(United States)	
2002	Limited	(United States) Vicki Carlton	(United States)	(United States)	
2003	Open	(United States) Nancy Huspek	(United States)	(United States)	
2004	Open	(United States) Kay Miculek	(United States)	(United States)	Barry, Illinois
2005	Open	(United States) Kay Miculek	(United States)	(United States)	
2005	Tactical	(United States) Denise Pearman	(United States)	(United States)	
2006	Tactical	(United States) Cheryl Current	(United States)	(United States)	Bend, Oregon
2007	Tactical	(United States) Jessie Abbate	(United States)	(United States)	Tulsa, Oklahoma
2008	Open	(United States) Kay Miculek	(United States)	(United States)	Princeton, Louisiana
2008	Tactical	(United States) Jessie Abbate	(United States)	(United States)	Princeton, Louisiana
2009	Open	(United States) Maggie Reese	(United States)	(United States)	Boulder City, Nevada
2009	Tactical	(United States) Tasha Hanish	(United States)	(United States)	Boulder City, Nevada
2010	Open	(United States) Maggie Reese	(United States)	(United States)	Las Vegas, Nevada
2010	Tactical	(United States) Tasha Hanish	(United States)	(United States)	Las Vegas, Nevada
2011	Open	(United States) Kay Miculek	(United States)	(United States)	Las Vegas, Nevada
2011	Tactical	(United States) Katie Harris	(United States)	(United States)	Las Vegas, Nevada
2012	Tactical	(United States) Katie Harris	(United States)	(United States)	Las Vegas, Nevada
2013	Open	(United States) Dianna Liedorff	(United States)	(United States)	Las Vegas, Nevada
2013	Tactical	(United States) Katie Harris	(United States)	(United States)	Las Vegas, Nevada
2014	Open	(United States) Kay Miculek	(United States)	(United States)	Las Vegas, Nevada
2014	Tactical	(United States) Lena Miculek	(United States)	(United States)	Las Vegas, Nevada
2015	Open	(United States) Maggie Reese	(United States) Cathy Kiyota	(United States) Annette Williamson	Las Vegas, Nevada
2015	Tactical	(United States) Katie Harris	(United States) Tahnee Torres	(United States) Sky Killian	Las Vegas, Nevada
2016	Open	(United States)	(United States)	(United States)	Las Vegas, Nevada
2016	Tactical	(United States)	(United States)	(United States)	Las Vegas, Nevada
2017	Open	(United States)	(United States)	(United States)	Boulder City, Nevada
2017	Tactical	(United States)	(United States)	(United States)	Boulder City, Nevada
2018	Open	(United States)	(United States)	(United States)	Boulder City, Nevada
2018	Tactical	(United States)	(United States)	(United States)	Boulder City, Nevada
2019	Open	(United States) Lena Miculek	(United States) Rebecca Yackley	(United States) Wannitsa Gomez	Frostproof, Florida
2019	Tactical	(United States) Ashley Rheuark	(United States) Lanny Barnes	(United States) Diana Muller	Frostproof, Florida

== See also ==
- USPSA Handgun Championship
- IPSC US Handgun Championship
- IPSC Handgun World Shoots
