= Jan Foss =

Norwegian sport shooter

Jan Sigurd Foss
Personal information
- Nationality: Norwegian
Medal record
IPSC
Representing Norway
IPSC Handgun World Shoot
Gold medal – first place	1976 Salzburg

Jan Foss (1 December 1938 - 12 June 2021) was a Norwegian sport shooter from Oslo who became the second world champion in practical shooting in 1976 during the IPSC Handgun World Shoot II in Salzburg, Austria. The favourite ahead of the championship was reigning world champion Ray Chapman from USA, who competed with a 1911-pistol in .45 ACP. Foss took the title with a SIG P210 in 9×19 mm with minor scoring, while Chapman and most of the other competitors shot the .45" caliber with major scoring which was considered an advantage due to the scoring system. The competition was described as being versatile, and Foss shot 379 points which was enough to take the title with a small margin of only four points ahead of Ray Chapman in second place with 375 points (98.94%). Foss had been unknown before the world championship, and did not compete internationally afterwards. He continued to compete locally throughout his career with pistol, rifle and shotgun where he took several medals.

== See also ==
- Hilde Nakling
- Håvard Østgaard
- Vidar Nakling
