= South African Practical Shooting Association =

Sports governing body in South Africa

- Formation: 1976
- Chairman: Gerrit Dokter
- Parent organization: International Practical Shooting Confederation
- Website: sapsa.co.za

The South African Practical Shooting Association (SAPSA) is the South African association for practical shooting under the International Practical Shooting Confederation.

== See also ==
- South African Rifle Championship
