= Army Marksmanship Unit =

Army Marksmanship Unit may refer to:

- The United States Army Marksmanship Unit
- The Indian Army Marksmanship Unit
- Army Marksmanship Unit, Jhelum, Pakistan

== See also ==
- USAMU
