= Isosceles (disambiguation) =

An isosceles triangle is a triangle with two equal sides.

Isosceles may also refer to:

- Isosceles (band), an indie pop band from Scotland
- Isosceles set, a set of points all triples of which form isosceles triangles
- Isosceles shooting stance, a posture in which the arms and chest of the shooter describe an isosceles triangle
- Isosceles trapezoid, a trapezoid with two equal sides

== See also ==
- Isosceles triangle theorem, the theorem that isosceles triangles have two equal angles
- Isosceles Peak, a mountain in Canada
