= IPSC Slovak Rifle Championship =

IPSC level 3 championship

The IPSC Slovak Rifle Championship is an IPSC level 3 championship held once a year by the Slovak Association for Dynamic Shooting.

== Champions ==
The following is a list of current and previous champions.

=== Overall category ===
Year	Division	Gold	Silver	Bronze	Venue
2016	Open	(Slovakia) Michal Mysiak	(Slovakia) Rastislav Korba	(Poland) Arkadiusz Jazwinski	
2016	Standard	(Slovakia) Vit Helan	(Slovakia) Tomaž Jamnik	(Italy) Manuele Avoledo	

=== Senior category ===
Year	Division	Gold	Silver	Bronze	Venue
2016	Open	(Slovakia) Jiri Broz	(Slovakia) Jiří Plzák	(Italy) Fabio Scanavin	
2016	Standard	(Slovakia) Palka Jan	(Slovakia) Antonín Navrátil	(Slovakia) Dusan Veselsky	
