= Weaver stance =

Two-handed stance for use when firing handguns

A United States Marine assuming the Weaver Stance during a pistol marksmanship course.

The Weaver stance is a shooting technique for handguns. It was developed by Los Angeles County Deputy Sheriff Jack Weaver during freestyle pistol competition in Southern California during the late 1950s.

== Description ==
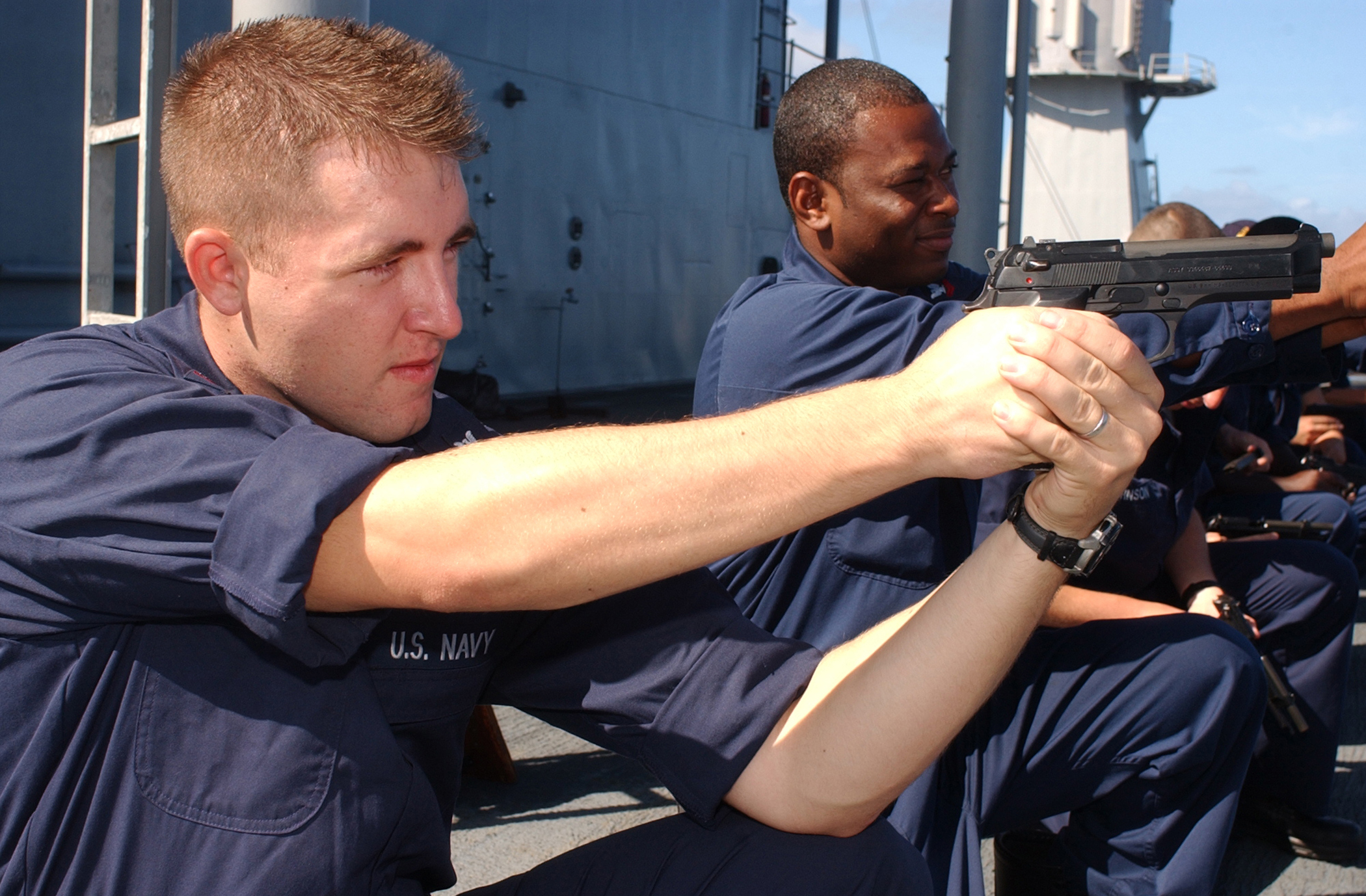
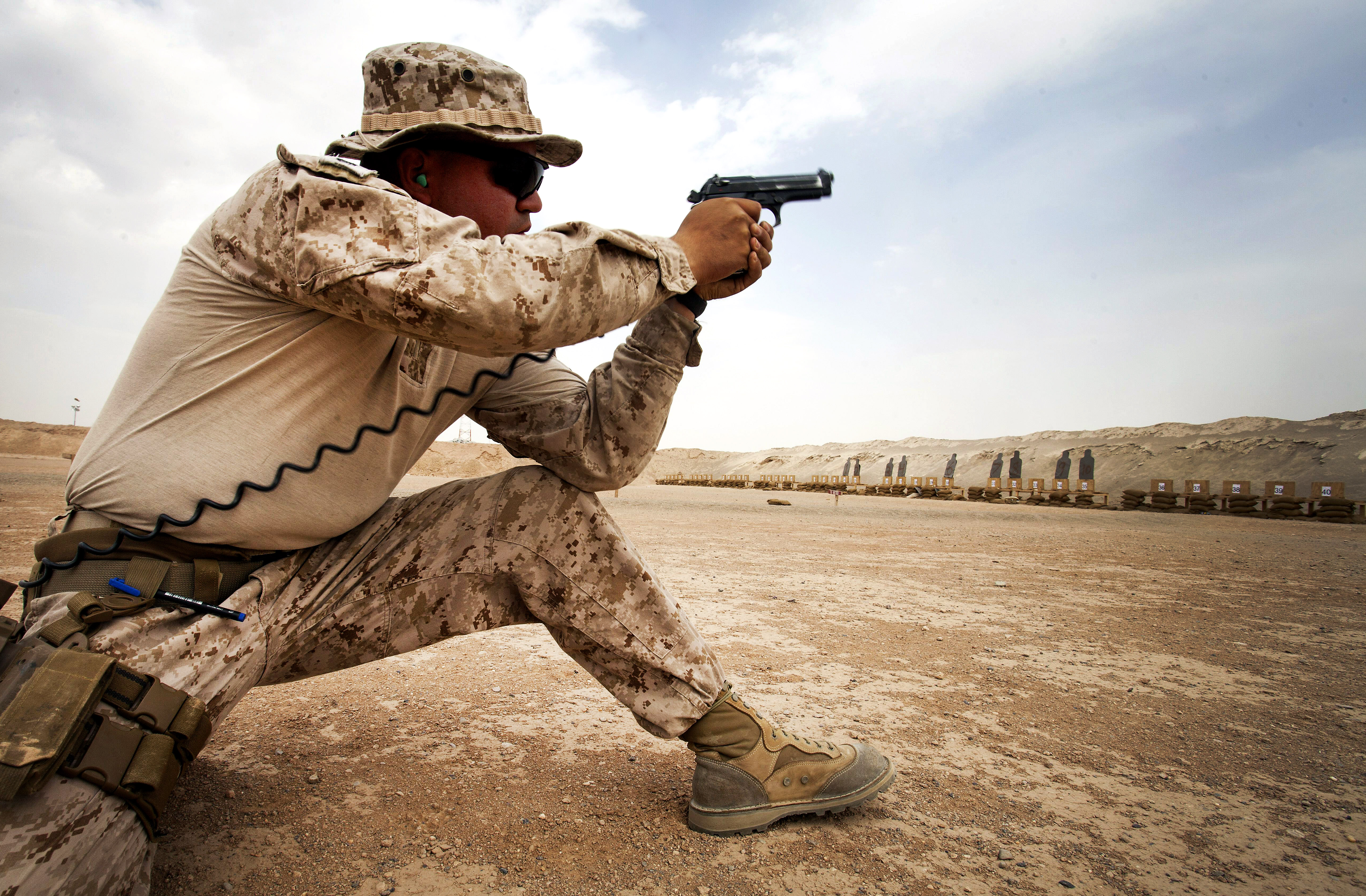
Weaver Stance as adapted to firing from a kneeling position.

The Weaver stance has two main components.

1. The first component is a two-handed technique in which the shooting hand holds the handgun while the support hand wraps around the shooting hand. The shooting arm's elbow is slightly bent (almost locked out) while the support elbow is noticeably bent straight down. The shooter pushes forward with his/her shooting hand while the support hand exerts rearward pressure on the firearm. The resultant isometric tension from the support hand is intended to lessen and control muzzle flip when the firearm is fired, allowing for faster follow-up shots.
2. The second component is the positioning of the feet in a boxing stance, with the non-shooting side foot ahead of the shooting side foot. A person shooting right-handed will have the right foot angled out to approximately forty-five degrees to the side and to the rear at shoulder length. Most of the shooter's weight will be on the forward foot, with the forward knee slightly bent and the rear leg nearly straight. The shooter's upper torso should be leaning forward at the hips, aiming the shoulders towards the forward foot. The rear foot will help catch the force of recoil, as well as allow for rapid changes in position. Both of the shooter's knees should be slightly bent and the shooter should be bending forward at the waist as if preparing to be pushed backward.

A left-handed shooter would reverse the hands and the footing, respectively.

== Modern technique ==
The Weaver stance is one of the four components of the modern technique of shooting developed by Jeff Cooper. The others are a large-caliber handgun, flash sight picture, and compressed surprise break.

== History ==
The Weaver stance was developed in 1959 by pistol shooter and deputy sheriff Jack Weaver, a range officer at the L.A. County Sheriff's Mira Loma pistol range. At the time, Weaver was competing in Jeff Cooper's "Leatherslap" matches: quick draw, man-on-man competition in which two shooters vied to pop twelve 18" wide balloons set up 21 feet away, whichever shooter burst all the balloons first winning the bout. Weaver developed his technique as a way to draw a handgun quickly to eye level and use the weapon's sights to aim more accurately, and immediately began winning against opponents predominantly using point shooting techniques.

The Weaver technique was dubbed the "Weaver Stance" by gun writer and firearms instructor Jeff Cooper. Cooper widely publicized the Weaver stance in several of his books, as well as in articles published in the then-fledgling Guns & Ammo magazine. When Cooper started the American Pistol Institute firearms training school, now the Gunsite Training Center, in 1977, his modern technique of the pistol was built around a somewhat formalized "Classic Weaver Stance". Due to Cooper's influence, the Weaver stance became very popular among firearm professionals and enthusiasts.

== Notes ==
- Although the Weaver Stance was originally designed for pistols, it can be applied to virtually any type of firearm. However, the main principles of the stance must still be applied (support foot rear at shoulder length with support foot at forty-five degrees while support hand supports the weight of the firearm). This technique has many variations including stances with the support hand carrying a flashlight, knife, baton or other item.
- Although this firearm technique is still popular among shooting enthusiasts and firearm professionals, many current firearm instructors favor the Isosceles Stance.
