= IPSC South African Rifle Championship =

The IPSC South African Rifle Championship is an IPSC level 3 championship held once a year by the South African Practical Shooting Association.

== Champions ==
The following is a list of current and previous champions.

=== Overall category ===
Year	Division	Gold	Silver	Bronze	Venue
2012	Open	(South Africa) Paul Eksteen	(South Africa) Jan Bendesio	(South Africa) Eddie Smith	
2012	Standard	(South Africa) Tinus Botha	(South Africa) Danie Du Toit	(South Africa) Lukes Janse Van Rensburg	
2015	Open	(South Africa) Lukas Marthinus Janse Van Rensburg	(South Africa) Paul Eksteen	(South Africa) Jan Christiaan Bondesio	
2015	Standard	(South Africa) Marthinus Wille Botha	(South Africa) Pieter Albertyn Van Wyk	(South Africa) Demis Karamitsos	
2016	Open	(South Africa) Lukas Mathinus Janse Van Rensburg	(South Africa) Jan Christiaan Bondesio	(South Africa) Dirk Becker	
2016	Standard	(South Africa) Pieter Albertyn Van Wyk	(South Africa) Demis Karamitsos	(South Africa) Terry Calivitis	

=== Lady category ===
Year	Division	Gold	Silver	Bronze	Venue
2012	Open	(South Africa) Cecilia Du Toit	(South Africa) Marita Botha	(South Africa) Karen Shawe	
2015	Open	(South Africa) Marita Botha	(South Africa) Ets Van Den Berg	(South Africa) Andrea Stevenson	
2016	Open	(South Africa) Marita Botha	(South Africa) Ets E Van Den Berg	(South Africa) Daleen Van Rensburg	

=== Senior category ===
Year	Division	Gold	Silver	Bronze	Venue
2012	Open	(South Africa) Carlo Belletti	(South Africa) Joel Cohen	(South Africa) Jan Van Den Berg	
2012	Standard	(South Africa) Zirk Pansegrouw	(South Africa) Daan Kemp	(South Africa) Sean Mullin	
2015	Open	(South Africa) Eddie E Smith	(South Africa) Jan Van Den Berg	(South Africa) Paul Andrew Zorn	
2016	Open	(South Africa) Eddie E Smith	(South Africa) Paul Andrew Zorn	(South Africa) Jan Van Den Berg	

=== Super Senior category ===
Year	Division	Gold	Silver	Bronze	Venue
2015	Open	(South Africa) Joel Cohen	(South Africa) Carlo Belletti	(South Africa) Gerrit Dokter	
2016	Open	(South Africa) Carlo Belletti	(South Africa) Irving Robert Stevenson	(South Africa) Gerrit Dokter	
