= IPSC Pan-American Shotgun Championship =

Shooting competition

The IPSC Pan-American Shotgun Championship is an IPSC level 4 championship hosted every third year in either North- or South America, usually in the U.S. State of Kentucky.

== History ==
- 2010 Kentucky, United States
- 2013 Kentucky, United States

== Champions ==
The following is a list of current and past IPSC Pan-American Shotgun Champions.

=== Overall category ===
| Year | Division | Gold | Silver | Bronze | Venue |
|---|---|---|---|---|---|
| 2010 | Open | (United States) Michael Voigt | | | Kentucky, United States |
| 2010 | Standard | | | | Kentucky, United States |
| 2010 | Standard Manual | | | | Kentucky, United States |
| 2013 | Open | (United States) Jerry Miculek | (United States) Jesse Tischauser | (United States) Craig Outzen | Kentucky, United States |
| 2013 | Standard | (United States) Robert Romero | (United States) James Casanova | (United States) Mark Hanish | Kentucky, United States |
| 2013 | Standard Manual | (United States) Patrick E Kelley | (United States) Jansen Jones | (United States) Joe Satterfield | Kentucky, United States |

=== Lady category ===
| Year | Division | Gold | Silver | Bronze | Venue |

=== Junior category ===
| Year | Division | Gold | Silver | Bronze | Venue |

=== Senior category ===
| Year | Division | Gold | Silver | Bronze | Venue |

=== Super Senior category ===
| Year | Division | Gold | Silver | Bronze | Venue |
