= Norwegian Armed Forces Shooting Committee =

The Norwegian Armed Forces Shooting Committee, Norwegian: Forsvarets Skyteutvalg (FSU) is a part of the Norwegian Armed Forces that give soldiers and former soldiers opportunity to compete in shooting sports. FSU also assists with marksmanship education and instruction for the Norwegian Armed Forces.

== Disciplines ==
FSU competes in CISM-shooting for rifle and pistol, which are mostly ISSF-programs. FSU also competes in other competitive shooting, i.e. Scandinavian field shooting with rifle.

== See also ==
- United States Army Marksmanship Unit
- List of shooting sports organizations
