= 1975 IPSC Handgun World Shoot =

International shooting tournament

1975 IPSC Handgun World Shoot I
- Location: Zürich, Switzerland

Medalists
gold medal	(United States) Ray Chapman
silver medal	(Switzerland) Paul Bakocs
bronze medal	(Rhodesia) Lionel Smith

The 1975 IPSC Handgun World Shoot I held at Zürich in Switzerland was the first IPSC Handgun World Shoot and was won by Ray Chapman of the United States using a 1911 in .45 caliber. Chapman had been central in the development of the sport of practical shooting in the late 1950s. He was seeded as number one before the championship, and shot an almost perfect match dropping only one point. He continued to compete until 1979 when he retired.

== Champions ==
Individual

Overall	Competitor	Points	Percent
Gold	(United States) Ray Chapman		100.00%
Silver	(Switzerland) Paul Bakocs		%
Bronze	(Rhodesia) Lionel Smith		%

Teams

Overall	Country	Points	Percent	Team members
Gold			100.00%	
Silver			%	
Bronze	Rhodesia		%	Dave Westerhout (Team Captain)

== See also ==
- IPSC Rifle World Shoots
- IPSC Shotgun World Shoot
- IPSC Action Air World Shoot
