= Patrick E. Kelley =

Medal record
IPSC
Representing United States
IPSC Pan-American Shotgun Championship
Gold medal – first place	2013 Kentucky	Manual

Patrick E. Kelley is a competition shooter, instructor, gunwriter, photographer and videographer. He started to compete actively in 3-Gun in 1999, placing Top Tyro in his first championship, the Soldier of Fortune 3 gun match.

In 2013 he took the individual gold medal in the IPSC Pan-American Shotgun Championship in Standard Manual division, and was part of the American Standard Manual National Team together with Jansen Jones, Joe Satterfield and Bryan Ray which placed first in the team classification.
