= Slovak Association for Dynamic Shooting =

Sports governing body in Slovakia

- Slovenskej Asociácie Dynamickej Streľby
- President: Bystrik Zachar
- Parent organization: International Practical Shooting Confederation
- Website: sads.sk

The Slovak Association for Dynamic Shooting, Slovak Slovenskej Asociácie Dynamickej Streľby (SADS), is the Slovak association for practical shooting under the International Practical Shooting Confederation.
