= Hot Shots (American TV series) =

American shooting sport television series

Hot Shots is an American shooting sport TV series produced by Creative Fuel Media for the NBC Sports Network, which follows well known shooting personalities both on and off the range, including Jerry Miculek, Clint Upchurch, KC Eusebio and Max Michel.

== See also ==
- Top Shot, an American shooting sport television show debuted on The History Channel
- 3-Gun Nation
