= Ray Chapman (marksman) =

American sport shooter

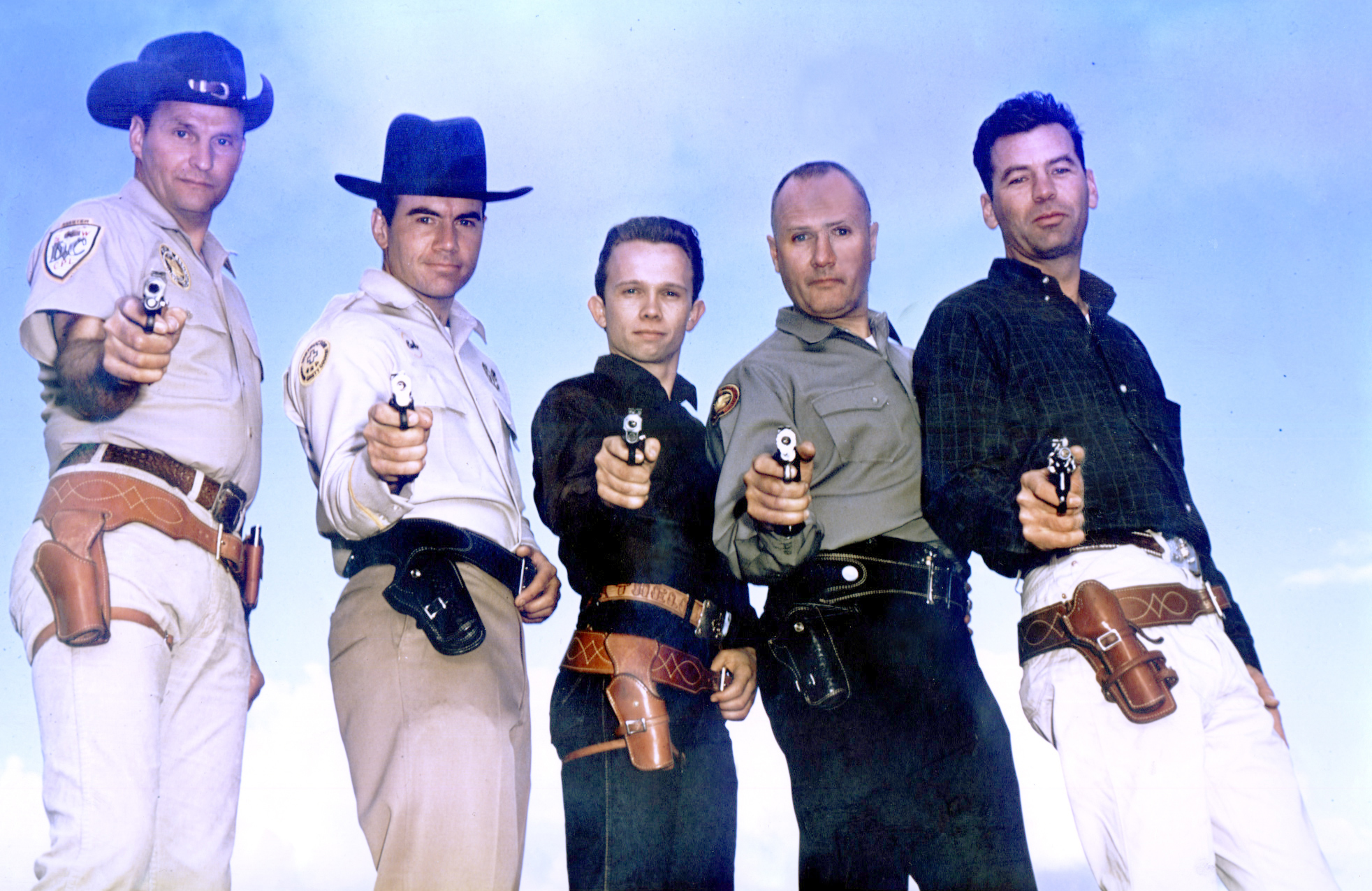
- From the left, Ray Chapman, Elden Carl, Thell Reed, Jeff Cooper, Jack Weaver. These were five of the most successful "Combat Masters" during the competitions held at the South Western Combat Pistol League ("SWCPL") at Big Bear Lake, California, during the late 1950s. (The sixth "Combat Master", John Plahn, is missing from this photograph.)

Personal information
- Born: 1929
- Died: February 2, 2008 (aged 79)
Medal record
IPSC
Representing United States
IPSC Handgun World Shoot
Gold medal – first place	1975 Zürich
Silver medal – second place	1976 Salzburg

Ray Chapman was an American sport shooter and firearms instructor who was central to the development of practical shooting. He was one of the founders of the International Practical Shooting Confederation at the 1976 Columbia Conference. He won the first IPSC Handgun World Shoot in 1975 and took silver behind Jan Foss from Norway in the second World Shoot in 1976. He continued to compete until 1979 when he retired from competition.

In his mid-teens Chapman served in the United States Marine Corps at the Pacific Ocean theater of World War II after lying about his age to enlist. After the war, he worked as a policeman before he became an engineer for the California Highway Department. In the 1950s, he was one of the pioneers of the Southwest Pistol League with Jeff Cooper.

In February 2008 Ray died peacefully at age 79 in a Texas hospital.
