= Isosceles Stance =

Shooting technique for handguns

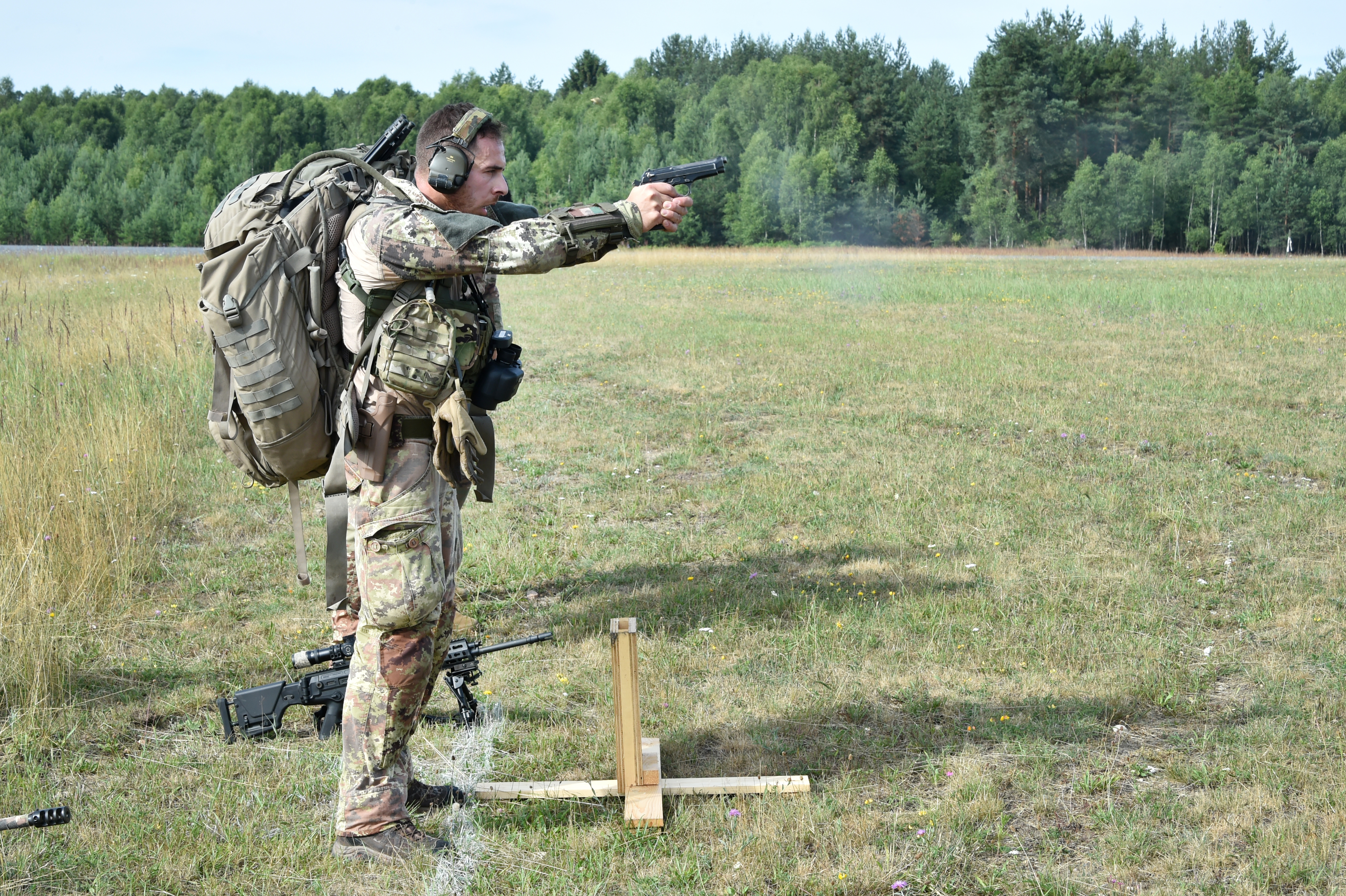
Italian sniper firing a Beretta pistol in the Isoceles stance.

The Isosceles shooting stance is a shooting technique for handguns. It became popular in the 1980s when Brian Enos and Rob Leatham started using it to win International Practical Shooting Confederation competitions. It is one of the two main stances for pistol shooting alongside the Weaver stance.

== Description ==
The Isosceles Stance is a two-handed technique in which the dominant hand's fingers grip the pistol directly (the Isosceles Grip is not recommended for high-power revolvers) while the support hand's fingers wrap around and grip the dominant hand's fingers. Conversely, it's the support hand's thumb that contacts the pistol, while the dominant hand's thumb wraps over the support hand's thumb. Both arms are held relatively straight, but are not locked at the elbows. Viewed from above, the arms and chest of the shooter describe an isosceles triangle (a triangle with two equal sides, from Greek iso "equal, uniform" and skelos "leg"), which gives the stance its name.

The Isosceles Stance is a simple stance, and is natural to perform under stress. Because the Isosceles Stance orients the torso of the shooter forward, it increases the usefulness of a ballistic vest compared to other shooting stances, which tend to present the less protected side of the torso, but also provides a larger target in the process.

== Modern Isosceles ==
The Modern Isosceles shooting stance, also known as the Modified Isosceles stance, is a more aggressive, forward-leaning version of the Traditional Isosceles. The shooter places the shoulders forward of the hips, the feet shoulder width apart, support-side foot slightly forward, and the knees bent. These changes to posture shift the center of mass forward, helping the shooter better control recoil.
