= United States Army Marksmanship Unit =

US Army training and recruiting unit

U.S. Army Marksmanship Unit
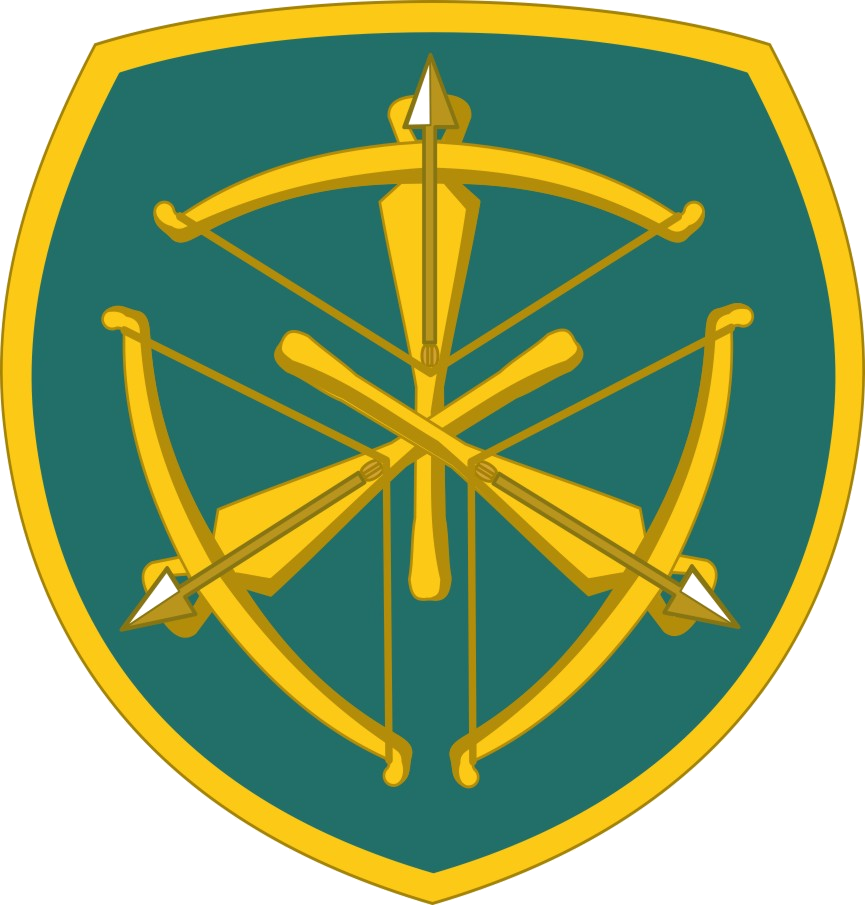
- USAMU's shoulder sleeve insignia
- Active: 1 March 1956–present
- Country: United States
- Branch: United States Army
- Role: Competition, training, and recruiting
- Part of: Marketing and Engagement Brigade, U.S. Army Recruiting Division
- Garrison/HQ: Fort Benning, Georgia
- Motto: "Home of champions"
- Website: www.army.mil/usamu

Insignia
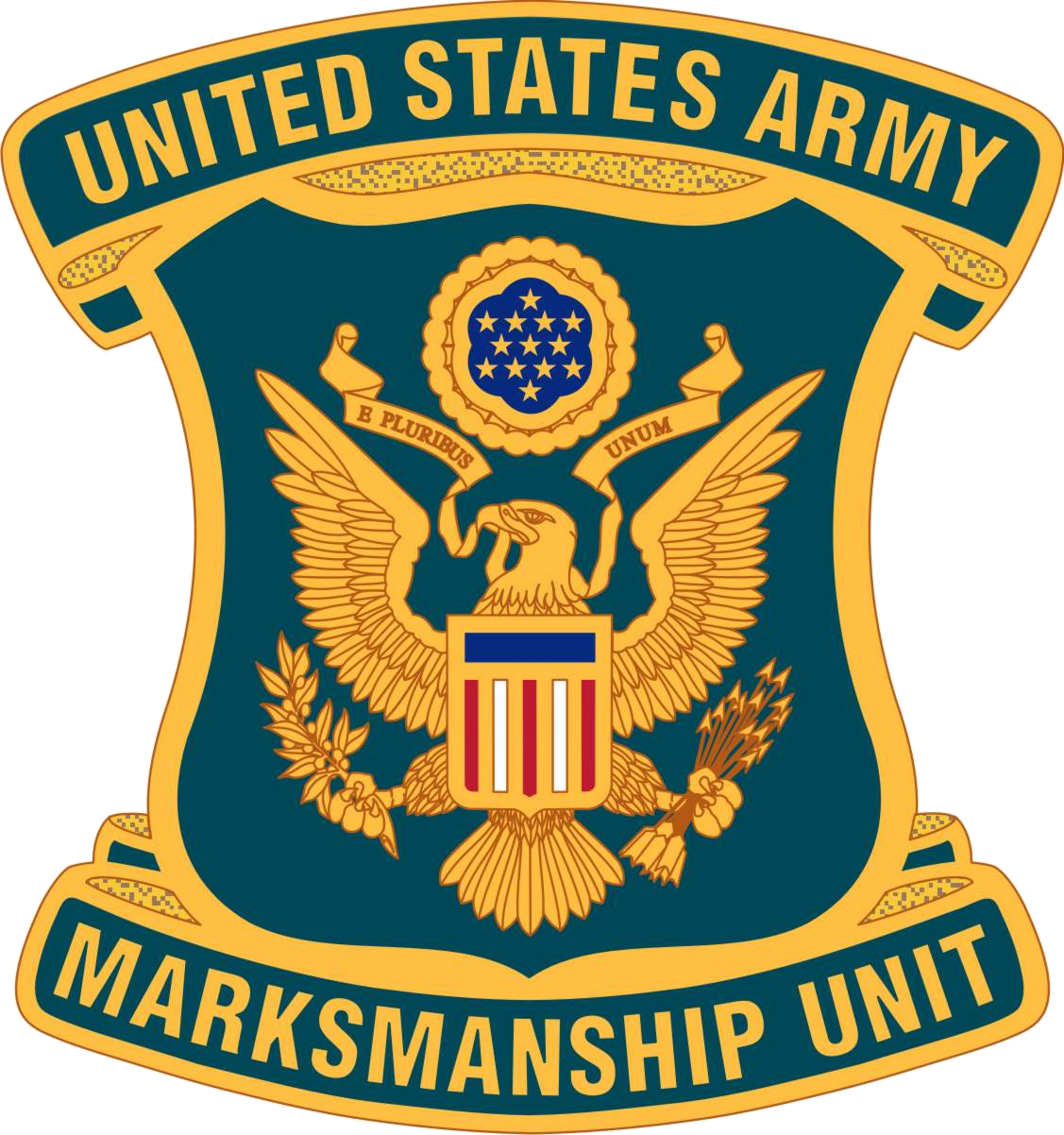
- Distinctive unit insignia

- USAMU shoulder cord (worn on the right shoulder of the service uniform)

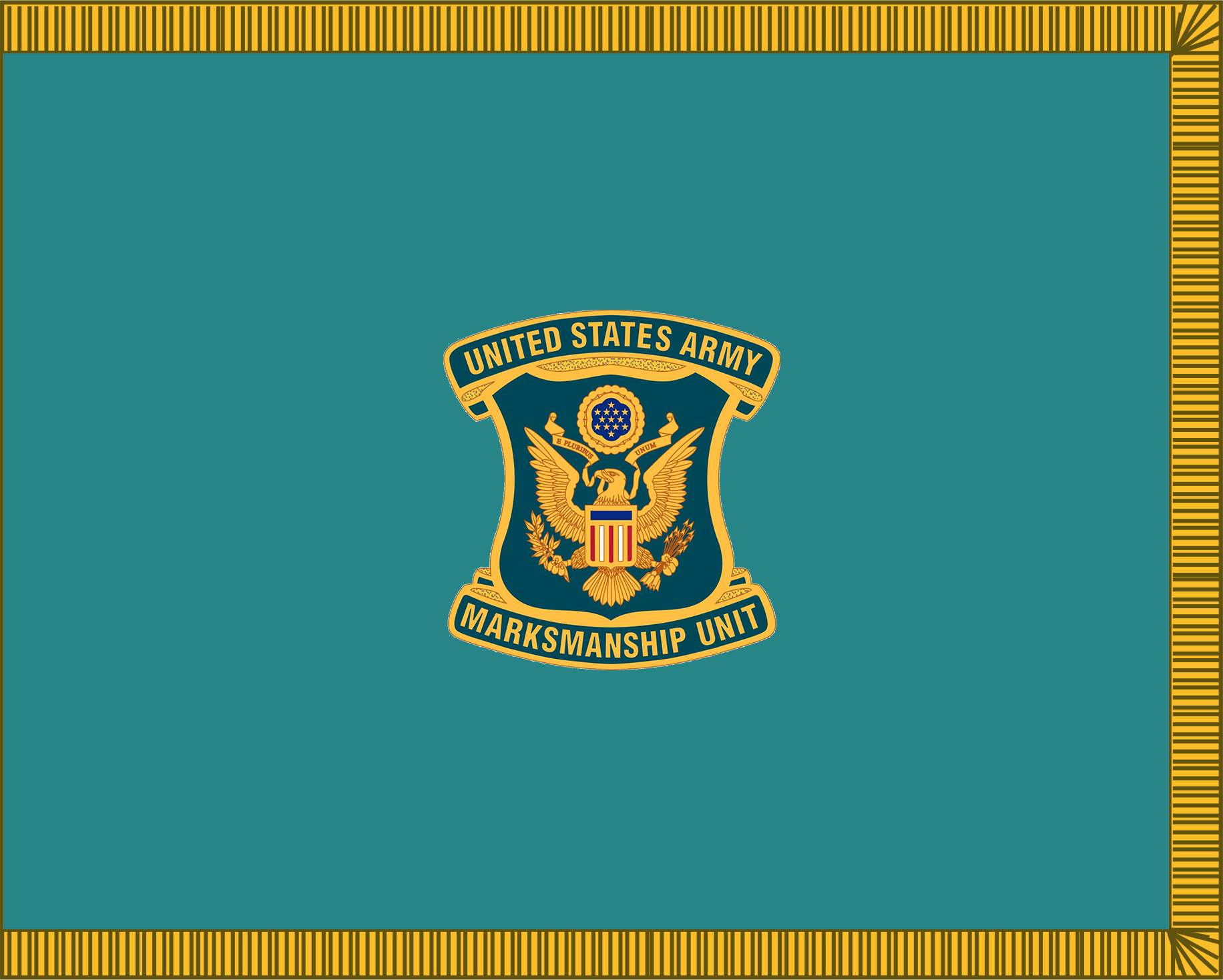
- United States Army Marksmanship Unit Flag

The United States Army Marksmanship Unit (USAMU or AMU) is a part of U.S. Army providing small arms marksmanship training for soldiers and enhancing Army recruiting. The unit was originally established in 1956 at the direction of president Dwight D. Eisenhower to the mission of winning international competitions, which at the time was dominated by the Soviet Union. At the 1964 Summer Olympics, the United States won seven medals in shooting, of which six were won by Army Marksmanship Unit members; unit members have continued to win medals at subsequent competitions. A 2008 New York Times article notes that the unit has "a reputation as the country's premier training school for competitive shooters." The unit has also trained army snipers and assisted in the development of weaponry.

U.S. Army Marksmanship Unit Overview

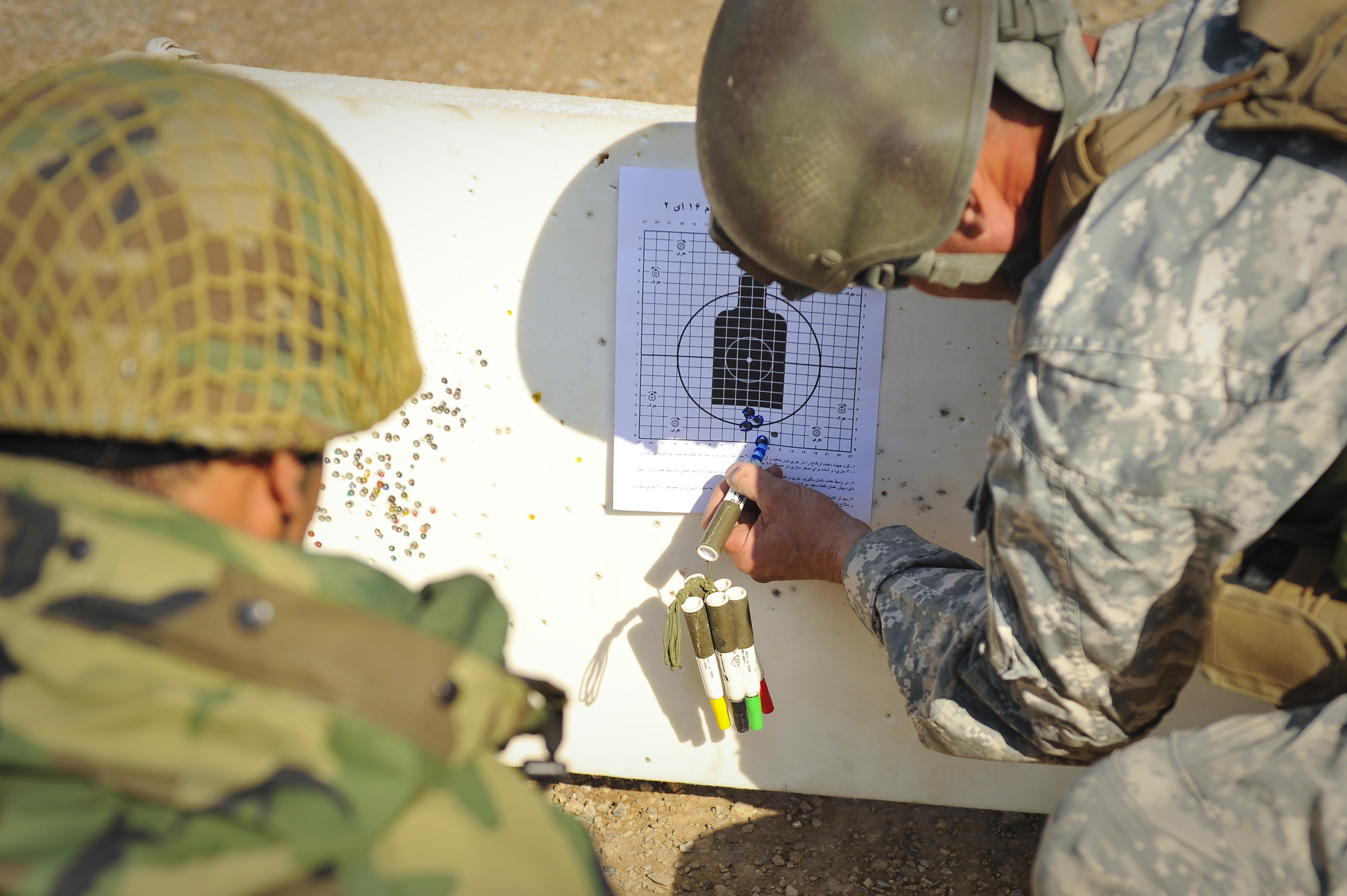
A USAMU NCO trains an Afghan National Army soldier in shot-group identification and discusses what sight adjustments to make on his weapon

== Sections ==
The Army Marksmanship Unit consists of seven teams:

- Action Shooting Team
- Custom Firearms Shop
- Instructor Training Group
- International Rifle Team
- Service Pistol Team
- Service Rifle Team
- Shotgun Team

== See also ==
- Norwegian Armed Forces Shooting Committee
- List of shooting sports organizations
