= 1976 IPSC Handgun World Shoot =

International shooting tournament

1976 IPSC Handgun World Shoot II
- Location: Berndorf, Salzburg, Austria
- Competitors: 160 from 13 nations

Medalists
gold medal	(Norway) Jan Foss
silver medal	(United States) Ray Chapman
bronze medal	(Rhodesia) Lionel Smith

The 1976 IPSC Handgun World Shoot II held in Berndorf, Salzburg, Austria was the second IPSC Handgun World Shoot, and was won by Jan Foss of Norway in front of Ray Chapman of United States by a small margin. Foss had been unknown before the championship and did not participate internationally afterwards.

== Equipment ==
Jan Foss used a 9×19mm single-stack SIG P210 in minor power factor with an 8 round capacity, while Ray Chapman used a 7-round-capacity 1911 in major caliber .45 ACP. The Rhodesian teammates Dave Westerhout, Peter Maunder and Dave Arnold were handicapped in that they only had been able to bring two pistols to share, but the night before the championship the sight broke off one of the pistols, so all three had to share a single pistol throughout the championship.

== Champions ==
Individual

Overall	Competitor	Points	Percent
Gold	(Norway) Jan Foss	379	100.00%
Silver	(United States) Ray Chapman	375	98.94%
Bronze	(Rhodesia) Lionel Smith	374	98.68%
4th	(Rhodesia) Dave Westerhout	369	97.36%
5th	(Norway) Vidar Nakling	367	96.83%
6th	(United States) Ronald Lerch	357	94.20%
6th	(Norway) Erik Braathen	357	94.20%
6th	(Rhodesia) Peter Maunder	357	94.20%
9th	(Norway) Johnny Hoffman	349	92.08%
10th	(Norway) Svein Tangen	348	91.82%

Teams

The team competition became a sensational competition between Rhodesia and Norway, and in the end only 29 points separated the two. The USA team had been favorites before the championship, but had to settle for third place 185 points behind Rhodesia and 156 points behind Norway.

Overall	Country	Points	Percent	Team members
Gold	Rhodesia	1763	100.00%	Dave Westerhout (Team Captain), Lionel Smith, Peter Maunder, Alex du Plessis and Dave Arnold
Silver	Norway	1734	98.36%	
Bronze	United States	1578	89.51%	
4th	South Africa	1566	88.83%	
5th	West Germany	1562	88.60%	
6th	Austria	1533	86.95%	

== See also ==
- IPSC Rifle World Shoots
- IPSC Shotgun World Shoot
- IPSC Action Air World Shoot
