= 3-Gun Nation =

- Genre: Sports, firearms, shooting
- Country of origin: United States
- Original language: English

Original release
- Release: July 31, 2011 – June 1, 2015

3-Gun Nation (3GN) was a sports league, club series, membership organization and television program featuring 3-Gun shooting in general as well as the 3-Gun Nation Pro Series tournaments. The winner of the yearly tournament was crowned as the 3-Gun Nation champion and won a $50,000 grand prize. For several years 3GN was able to provide $50,000 for the overall winner, $10,000 for second place and $5,000 for 3rd. It also developed the Ladies Pro circuit which offered a $25,000 grand prize. For several consecutive years 3GN awarded over $90,000 in cash prizes at its championship events.

During its tenure, 3GN provided over $650,000 in prize money to the competition shooting community. A large portion of which was awarded to Daniel Horner of the US Army Marksmanship Unit. Horner earned over $190,000 in cash earnings from 3GN from championship events and smaller cash events. Other 3GN Pro's such as Keith Garcia, Tommy Thacker and Greg Jordan earned $50,000 each in grand prize money respectively. Lena Miculek, daughter of famed shooter Jerry Miculek earned $75,000 in cash earnings from 3-Gun Nation.

3-Gun Nation was the first-and-only competitive shooting league in history which followed rules based in practical shooting and promoted the use of high-capacity small arms (most notably the AR-15) for a mainstream sports-television audience. From 2010 - 2018 3GN aired on NBC Sports, Sportsman Channel, MAV TV, The Blaze and other syndicated networks. In addition to the national attention it gave the sport and its competitors, 3GN also held the annual "Rumble on the Range" during the NSSF's Shot Show that featured its famed "shoot-off" events. These competitions featured a spectator-friendly format in which the competitors raced each-other to the final target.

Further efforts were discontinued by its ownership in 2019 and was formally shut-down in 2021.

== Affiliations ==
3-Gun Nation today has affiliate clubs in over ten countries:

- Australia
- Argentina
- China
- Hong Kong
- Japan
- Malta
- South Africa
- Sweden
- Taiwan
- UK
- Ukraine

== See also ==
- Hot Shots (American TV series)
