= Princeton, Louisiana =

Unincorporated community in Louisiana, U.S.

Coordinates: 32°35′22″N 93°30′55″W

Princeton is an unincorporated community in Bossier Parish, Louisiana, United States. It is part of the Shreveport-Bossier City Metropolitan Statistical Area. The ZIP Code for Princeton is 71067.

George Dement, the mayor of Bossier City from 1989 to 2005, was born in a farmhouse in Princeton in 1922.

== Education ==
The all of Bossier Parish is in the Bossier Parish School District.

There is a collective attendance boundary of T. L. Rodes Elementary School (in Eastwood CDP, PreKindergarten-Grade 1), Platt Elementary School (in Eastwood CDP, grades 2-3), and Princeton Elementary School (grades 4-5); Residents of that zone are also zoned to Haughton Middle School and Haughton High School.
