= Thell Reed =

American exhibition shooter and firearms expert

- Born: February 11, 1943 (age 83); Downey, California
- Known for: Holds United States quick-draw record
- Spouse: Stacy Reed
- Relatives: Hannah Gutierrez-Reed (stepdaughter)

Thell Reed is an American exhibition shooter, stuntman, armorer, and movie consultant.

== Shooting career ==
As a teenager, Reed competed in Jeff Cooper's Big Bear "Leatherslaps" shooting competitions at Big Bear Lake, California. The Leatherslaps became the "South Western Combat Pistol League" or "SWCPL". Reed competed so successfully that he became one of six "Combat Masters", so called because they would almost always take the first six places in the competition. Of the six Combat Masters (Reed, John Plähn, Jack Weaver, Elden Carl, Ray Chapman, and Cooper), Reed had the quickest draw. After the SWCPL matches, Reed went on to compete in fast draw competitions in which he achieved fame.

Reed's success in firearms competitions gained him entry into the movie industry and he became an advisor to motion pictures and television. He trained actors such as Russell Crowe and Brad Pitt for acting roles involving the use of pistols. He also trained Michael Biehn for the film Tombstone, where Biehn portrayed gunfighter Johnny Ringo.

== Personal life ==
Reed is the stepfather of set armorer Hannah Gutierrez-Reed, who was the head armorer for Rust during the October 2021 Rust movie set shooting incident.

== See also ==
- Weapons master
- Fast Draw
