= Practical shooting =

Shooting sport based around precision, power, and speed

Action shooting
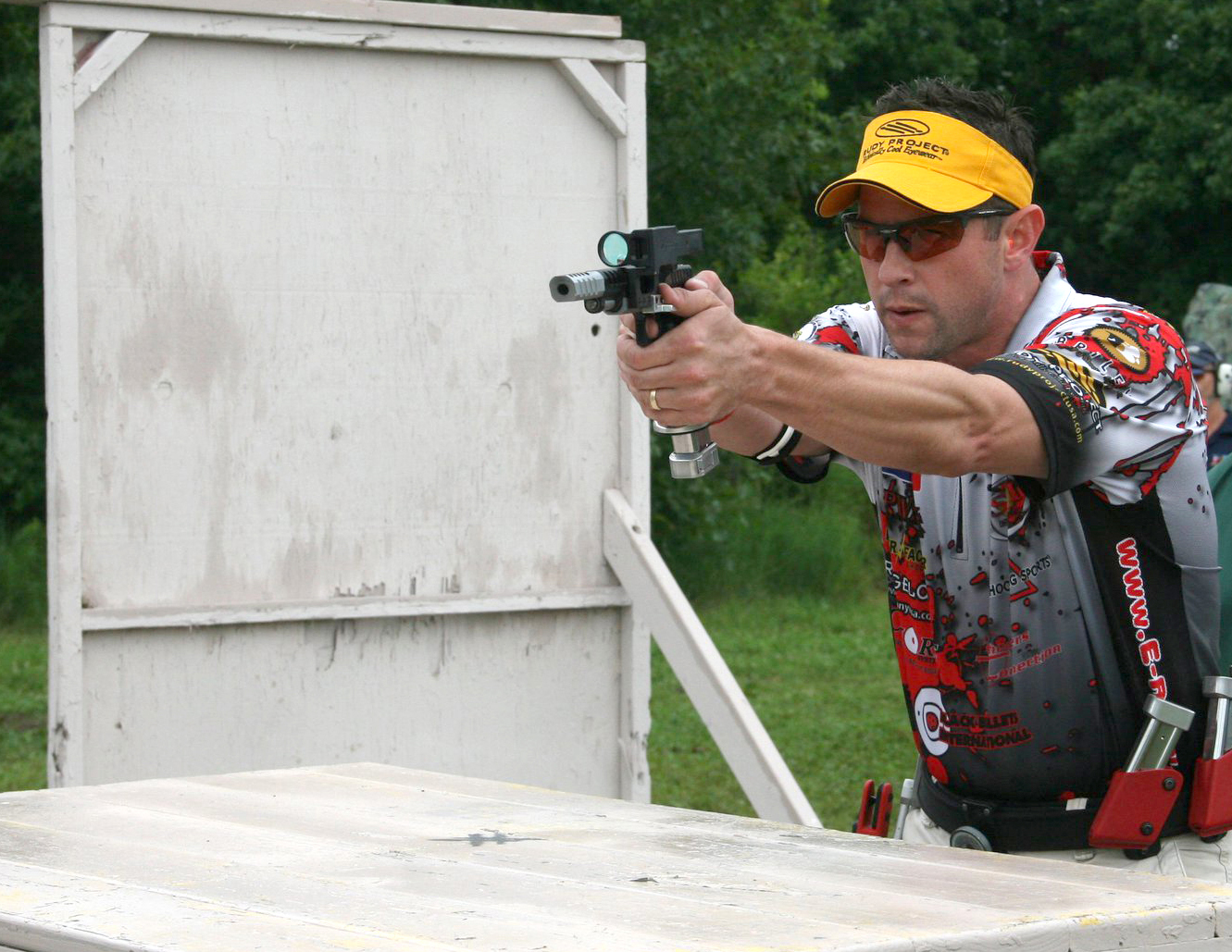
- An Open division competitor during a stage.
- Highest governing body: International Practical Shooting Confederation
- First played: 1950s

Characteristics
- Contact: No
- Team members: Yes
- Mixed-sex: Yes
- Type: Shooting sport
- Equipment: Handguns, rifles, and/or shotguns
- Venue: Shooting range

Presence
- Country or region: Worldwide

Practical shooting, also known as dynamic shooting or action shooting, is a set of shooting sports in which the competitors try to unite the three principles of precision, power, and speed, by using a firearm of a certain minimum power factor to score as many points as possible during the shortest time (or sometimes within a set maximum time). While scoring systems vary between organizations, each measures the time in which the course is completed, with penalties for inaccurate shooting.

The courses are called "stages", and are shot individually by the shooters. Usually the shooter must move and shoot from several positions, fire under or over obstacles and in other unfamiliar positions. There are no standard exercises or set arrangement of the targets, and the courses are often designed so that the shooter must be inventive, and therefore the solutions of exercises sometimes vary between shooters.

== International sanctioning bodies ==
There are several international sanctioning bodies:

- The International Practical Shooting Confederation (IPSC) is the oldest and largest sanctioning body within practical shooting. IPSC Open Division is sometimes considered the "Formula One" of shooting sports, and is shot with handguns, rifles and shotguns.
  - The United States Practical Shooting Association (USPSA) is the U.S. regional affiliate of IPSC. Many of USPSA's rules differ slightly from those used internationally.
  - The Steel Challenge Shooting Association, founded as a separate discipline, was purchased and integrated by USPSA in 2007. In Steel Challenge matches, competitors shoot five strings of fire at a series of five steel plates of varying sizes at varied distances in an attempt to achieve the fastest time possible for knocking down the plates. The order of fire is dictated by a plate designated as the stop plate which must be shot last. The longest time is dropped and the remaining four times are averaged for a composite stage time.
- The International Defensive Pistol Association (IDPA) is a game based on the philosophy of using practical equipment to solve real world self-defense scenarios. Fundamental aspects include shooting from behind cover (when available) and a mandate on engaging targets immediately as they become visible. The sport was created to bring defensive tactics back as a component in addition to speed and accuracy.
- Cowboy Action Shooting is quite similar to IPSC-shooting, but with an Old West theme. There are multiple international sanctioning bodies, with Single Action Shooting Society being the oldest and largest. Firearms must be either original or reproduction designs correct for the 19th century, such as Colt single-action pistols and Winchester rifles. The competitors must also choose and go by a cowboy nickname, and are required to look the part by using cowboy and cowgirl garments in late 19th century period dress.
- Multigun, also called 2-Gun or 3-Gun depending on the weapons used, are shooting events with a combination of rifles, handguns and shotguns. While multi-gun has a lot in common with ordinary IPSC/USPSA matches, the biggest difference is that the shooter generally has to transition between the use of several different firearms in each stage. Among the largest annual multigun events in the USA are the USPSA Multigun Championship, the Rocky Mountain 3-Gun, the DPMS Tri-Gun Challenge, the Superstition Mountain Mystery 3-Gun, and the LaRue Tactical Multigun Championship.
- Glock Sport Shooting Foundation (GSSF) is a competition sponsored by Glock and limited to participants using Glock pistols.
- The Galactic Pistol Alliance (GPA), is based on IDPA but with "Half the Rules - Twice the Fun!".

== Origins ==
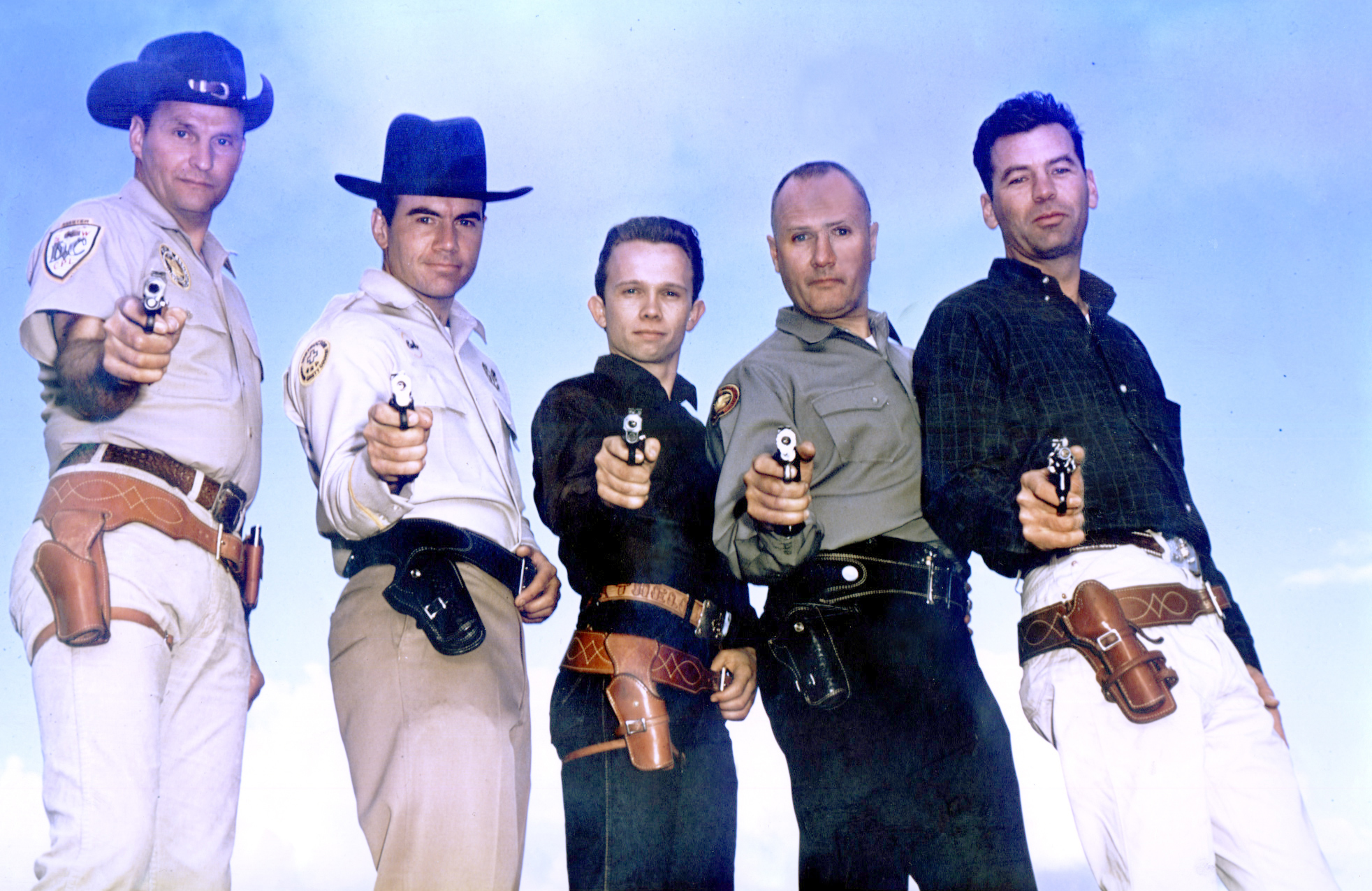
These men are five of the "Combat Masters", the most successful shooters during the competitions held at the South Western Combat Pistol League ("SWCPL") at Big Bear Lake, California, during the late 1950s. Left to right: Ray Chapman, Elden Carl, Thell Reed, Jeff Cooper, Jack Weaver. (The sixth "Combat Master", John Plahn, is missing from this photograph.)

Practical shooting evolved from experimentation with firearms for hunting and self-defense. The researchers of what were to become practical shooting were an international group of private individuals, law enforcement officers, and military people generally operating independently of each other, challenging the then-accepted standards of technique, training practices, and equipment. The work was, for the most part, conducted for their own purposes without official sanction. Even so, what they learned has had a great impact on police and military training forever.

Some consider the previous Olympic event 100 meter running deer as the first practical rifle shooting competition, which originated in Wimbledon, London in 1862. Other notable rifle speed shooting events are Stang shooting (stangskyting) which has been arranged since 1912, and Nordic field rapid shooting (called felthurtig, sekundfält and sekundskydning in Norway, Sweden and Denmark, respectively) which has been a part of the Nordic Fullbore Rifle Championship since 1953. Around 1900, efforts were done to develop more effective uses of handguns in combat shooting, mainly through experiments by two Britons, Captain William E. Fairbairn and Sergeant Eric A. Sykes. The first known attempts at developing practical shooting as a handgun sport were done in the U.S. before the Second World War, but the attempts resulted in little.

Shortly after the second world war a distinct combat shooting sport for handguns known as stridsskyting became popular in Norway. This form of shooting had few similarities with the practical pistol sport which would later emerge. During the 10 to 12 years of its existence, what today is known as field shooting gradually took over as the more popular form of pistol shooting in Norway, and the original stridsskyting was completely gone as a discipline in the beginning of the 1960s. Stridsskyting later also was used separately to describe the completely different sport of IPSC-style practical shooting during its infancy in Norway.

In the early 1950s, practical handgun competitions as we know them today emerged in the USA. Competitions began with the leather slap quick draw events, which had grown out of America's love affair with the TV westerns of that era. However, many wished for a forum that would more directly test the results of the experimentation in modern technique that had been going on at the Bear Valley Gunslingers at Big Bear Lake, California and other places. Competitions were set up to test what had been learned, and they soon grew into a distinct sport, requiring competitors to deal with constantly changing scenarios. The first public competition was at the Big Bear Lake in 1957. In 1969, the South-West-Pistol-League was formed by individual shooters and clubs from California, which to this day is one of the oldest clubs for practical shooting.

The first IPSC World Shoot was held in 1975 in Zurich, about two years before IPSC was formally founded. Ray Chapman from the U.S. became the first ever world class practical pistol champion. The next year, the 1976 IPSC Handgun World Shoot followed with Jan Foss from Norway taking gold. On 24 May 1976 the International Practical Shooting Confederation was formally founded at the Columbia conference in Columbia, Missouri, with representation in fourteen nations. Jeff Cooper was unanimously chosen as the first president. Between 1974 and 1979, stridsskytterligaen (literally the Combat Shooting League) had been the forerunner of IPSC shooting in Norway, until the Norwegian Association for Practical Shooting took over and was incorporated into IPSC in 1979.

Finland pioneered IPSC Rifle in Scandinavia in the beginning of the 1980s, and the discipline soon spread to Norway where the first competitions were held in Stavanger February 1984. In 1987 the first official Norwegian Rifle Championship was held, and the championship has been held annually since. South Africa has held IPSC Rifle and Shotgun matches since 1983, and IPSC multigun matches since 1984.

The United Kingdom Practical Shooting Association (UKPSA) was founded in 1977, and initially focused on practical handgun competitions. In the 1980s, practical shotgun competitions were held both by UKPSA as well as another organisation known as the Combat Shotgun Society. UKPSA also held IPSC practical rifle competitions, while the NRA UK has held a separate discipline known as NRA Practical Rifle competitions with courses usually including physical elements. Today, the NRA UK also holds Practical Shotgun competitions (PSG) alongside the IPSC Shotgun of UKPSA.

One of the first 3-Gun matches to be held in the United States was the Soldier of Fortune matches held in 1979 in Missouri, but these matches were neither associated with USPSA nor IPSC. The first USPSA Multigun Championship was held in 1990 at Pike-Adams Sportsmen's Alliance (PASA) in Barry, Illinois, but USPSA did not take on multigun full-time until around 2000. In Finland multigun matches have been held since around 1992.

Australia held a Rifle and Shotgun Championship in September 1987, and the first IPSC European Shotgun Championship was held in October 1987 at the National Shooting Centre in Bisley, England, a couple of days before the seventh IPSC European Handgun Championship at the same shooting range.

In the beginning IPSC Shotgun and Rifle competitions were run using the IPSC Handgun Competition Rules with small adjustments. Adjustments were later formalized in supplementary rulebooks, e.g. UKPSA published a supplementary Rifle and Shotgun rulebook in 1989. Since 1996 IPSC Shotgun and Rifle rules have been published in standalone rulebooks separate from the IPSC Handgun rules.

=== Organizations ===
In 1976, an international group of enthusiasts, interested in what had become known as "practical shooting", met in Columbia, Missouri. From that meeting came the International Practical Shooting Confederation (IPSC). In 1984, the United States Practical Shooting Association (USPSA) was incorporated as the US Region of IPSC. After many years of established IPSC competition, some shooters, including some of the original founders, became dissatisfied with IPSC, as more specialized equipment was allegedly required to remain competitive. The International Defensive Pistol Association (IDPA) was formed in 1996 with the aim of returning to the defensive pistol roots of practical shooting. Soon after this split, the USPSA devised a series of competition "divisions" with varying limits on type and modification of equipment, including a "Production" division with rules similar to the IDPA's regulations. Today USPSA and IDPA matches are two of the most popular forums of practical handgun shooting in the United States, with more than 25,000 and 11,000 members respectively.

In 1977 the UKPSA was formed to promote and regulate practical pistol shooting in the UK, and became England's regional affiliate of the IPSC. The association proved very popular, gaining international respect within the practical shooting community, and hosted many National, European and International competitions. Despite the 1997 Firearms Amendment Act in the UK, worldwide practical shooting is currently the second most popular international target shooting discipline and now the fastest growing. Most pistol shooting in the UK suffered severely after the handgun ban, which wiped out many shooting disciplines by removing the ability to participate. Practical shotgun has gained much popularity since the handgun ban, with numerous graded matches each year, and large entries to the European Practical Shotgun Championships.

== Scoring methods ==
Various scoring methods are used:

- Hit factor scoring
- Comstock scoring - Total available points on a given stage, minus penalties earned, divided by the time spent to score those points. Sometimes called "points per second" scoring, each competitor is graded against the shooter who, at the end of the competition, scores the highest "hit factor". Courses of fire utilizing the Comstock scoring method are allowed to shoot as many shots as needed to neutralize the targets, but not scored more points than each target allows, allowing a shooter to correct or "make up" points, albeit at the cost of the time taken to score the points.
- Virginia Count Scoring - Total available points on a given stage, minus penalties earned, divided by the time spent to score those points. Virginia Count or "Virginia" scoring prescribes the exact order of and total number of shots that may be taken during a stage, with shots taken and hits scored outside of the specified order penalized. Virginia Count can also specify specific shooting positions, strong, weak, or freestyle (two handed) shooting styles, and may mandate reloading the pistol on the clock.
- Time plus, similar to points down, scores a competitor's raw time to finish a course of fire, plus any additional penalties accrued. One of the simplest scoring methods, Time plus oftentimes is found in outlaw (unsanctioned) matches.
- Points down is the standard scoring method for IDPA. Shooters under points down score their time, plus their points down, plus any penalties incurred for their final score. Similar to time plus, Points Down progressively penalizes progressively worse marksmanship.
- Fixed time (par time) sets a time limit for each course of fire, and mandates shooters to score as many available points within the specified limit. Shooters do not typically incur penalties for not engaging targets (as these points were not scored within the time limit) but may incur penalties for taking shots outside of the time limit.

Two primary paper targets are recognized by IPSC and the USPSA and are named for each organization.

The USPSA Target (or Headbox Target) is the classically recognizable target for practical shooting. The modern USPSA target includes two Alpha (A) zones, one Charlie (C) zone, and one Delta (D) zone.

The IPSC Target (or "Turtle" Target) is a target designed specifically to not resemble a human being, and includes only one Alpha, Charlie, and Delta Zones. IPSC Targets are physically smaller than their USPSA counterparts and are subsequently considered harder targets to hit.

USPSA uses both IPSC and USPSA targets on their courses of fire, while IPSC only utilizes the IPSC target.

Modifiers to the scoring are controlled by a shooter's power factor, which is calculated based on projectile velocity times the projectile weight, divided by 1000. Each shooting organization controls the minimum floors for qualifying for "major" and "minor" power factors -- this prevents competitors from competing with lightly loaded ammunition, sometimes colloquially called "powder puff" ammunition.

USPSA awards an extra point per scoring zone outside of Alpha for competitors shooting "major" power factor.

== See also ==
- Safety area
- Combat pistol shooting
