= Jack Weaver =

Law enforcement professional and developer of a shooting stance

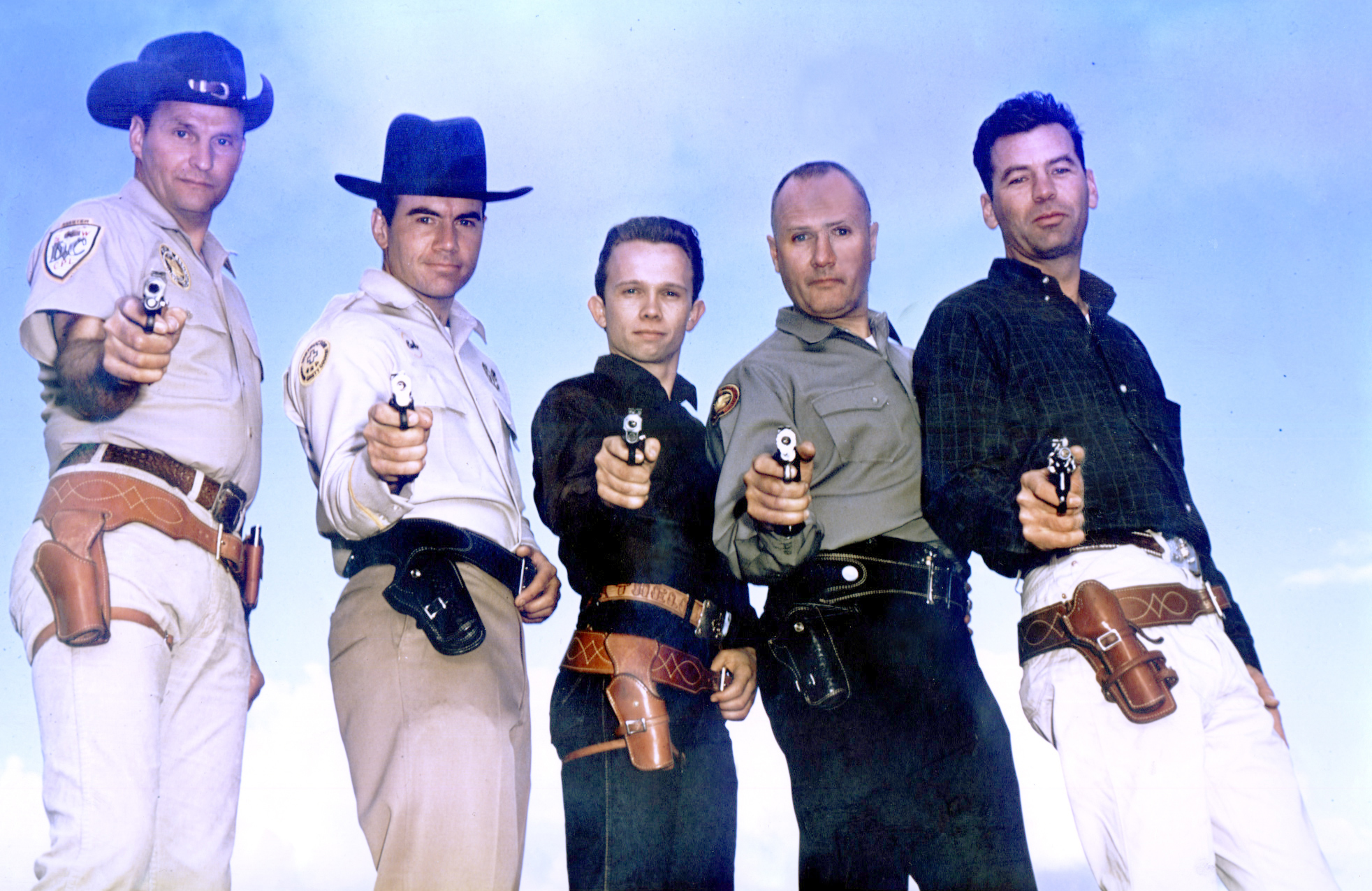
- Weaver, at right (c. 1957)
- Born: November 1, 1928; South Gate, California, US
- Died: April 7, 2009 (aged 80); Carson City, Nevada, US
- Education: Glendale Community College
- Occupation: Law enforcement
- Years active: 1954–1979
- Known for: Weaver stance
- Spouse: Joy Moniot

John Harold Weaver (November 1, 1928 – April 7, 2009) was a Los Angeles County Deputy Sheriff and the developer of the Weaver stance, a popular shooting stance for firing handguns.

== Biography ==
Weaver was born on November 1, 1928, in South Gate, California. (Note: Weaver's World War II draft registration card lists his place of birth as Huntington Park, California. Huntington Park and South Gate are both in the Gateway Cities region.) He was an only child. Weaver attended Herbert Hoover High School in Glendale, California, and briefly attended Glendale Community College, but left when he was drafted into the United States Army. It was around this time that he met Joy Moniot, whom he married on August 30, 1952, in Glendale. He joined the Los Angeles County Sheriff's Department in 1954.

Weaver was a member of the Southwest Combat Pistol League, along with several other competitive shooters including Ray Chapman. In 1955, the team and individuals won the national championships at the Toledo, Ohio, combat range using both one-handed and two-handed stances. The team defended the trophy for most of the following decade at practice matches in preparation for the National Pistol Matches, held shortly thereafter at Camp Perry in northern Ohio.

Weaver retired from the Los Angeles County Sheriff's Department in 1979, and resided near Carson City, Nevada, until his death.

== Weaver stance ==
The Weaver stance was developed by Weaver in the late 1950s to compete in Jeff Cooper's "Leatherslap" matches, which Weaver won in 1959. The stance, which incorporates a two-handed grip, isometric tension to reduce muzzle flip, and aimed fire using the weapon's sights, was adopted in 1982 as the official shooting style of the Federal Bureau of Investigation.

Weaver's approach to handgun technique is reflected in a 1994 letter he wrote to Handguns magazine: "Practice, experiment, shoot in competition, stick to one gun, one style (no last-second decisions) and don't wait until you're in a shootout to find out what works and what doesn't."
