= Multigun =

Type of practical shooting event

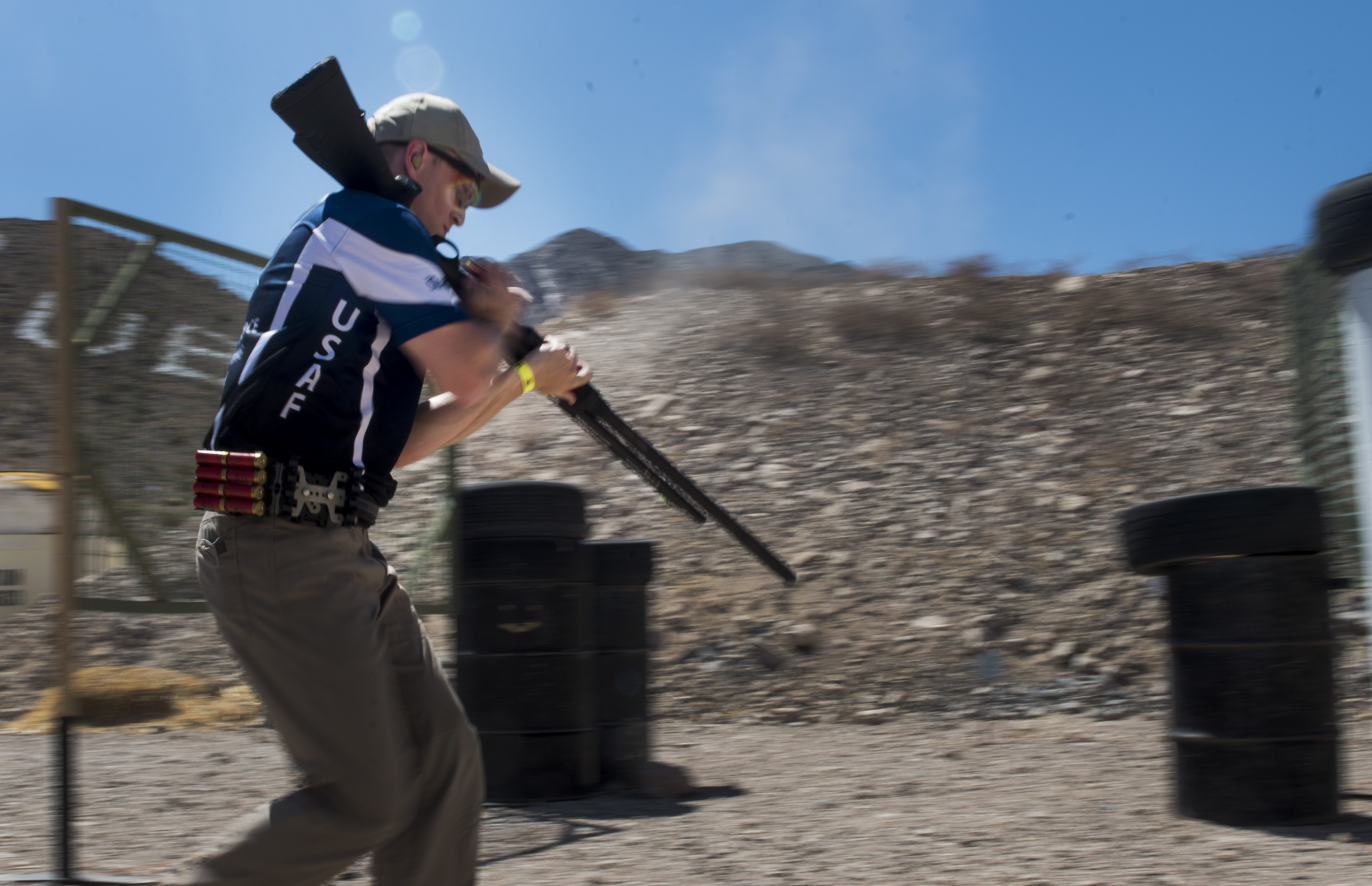
A competitor reloads a shotgun during the 2018 USPSA Multigun Championship in Boulder City, Nevada.

Multigun, Multi Gun or Multi-Gun, often also called 2-Gun or 3-Gun depending on the types of firearms used, are practical shooting events where each of the stages require the competitor to use a combination of handguns, rifles, and/or shotguns. Multigun has much in common with ordinary IPSC/ USPSA single gun matches, and matches generally have courses of fire where the shooter must move through different stages and engage targets in a variety of positions.

Multigun in its oldest form is arranged by the IPSC as tournaments, but does not require the competitor to transition between firearms during the stage. Instead tournaments consist of separate component matches for each firearm type with a combined scoring in the end.

== Multigun associations ==
=== In the United States ===
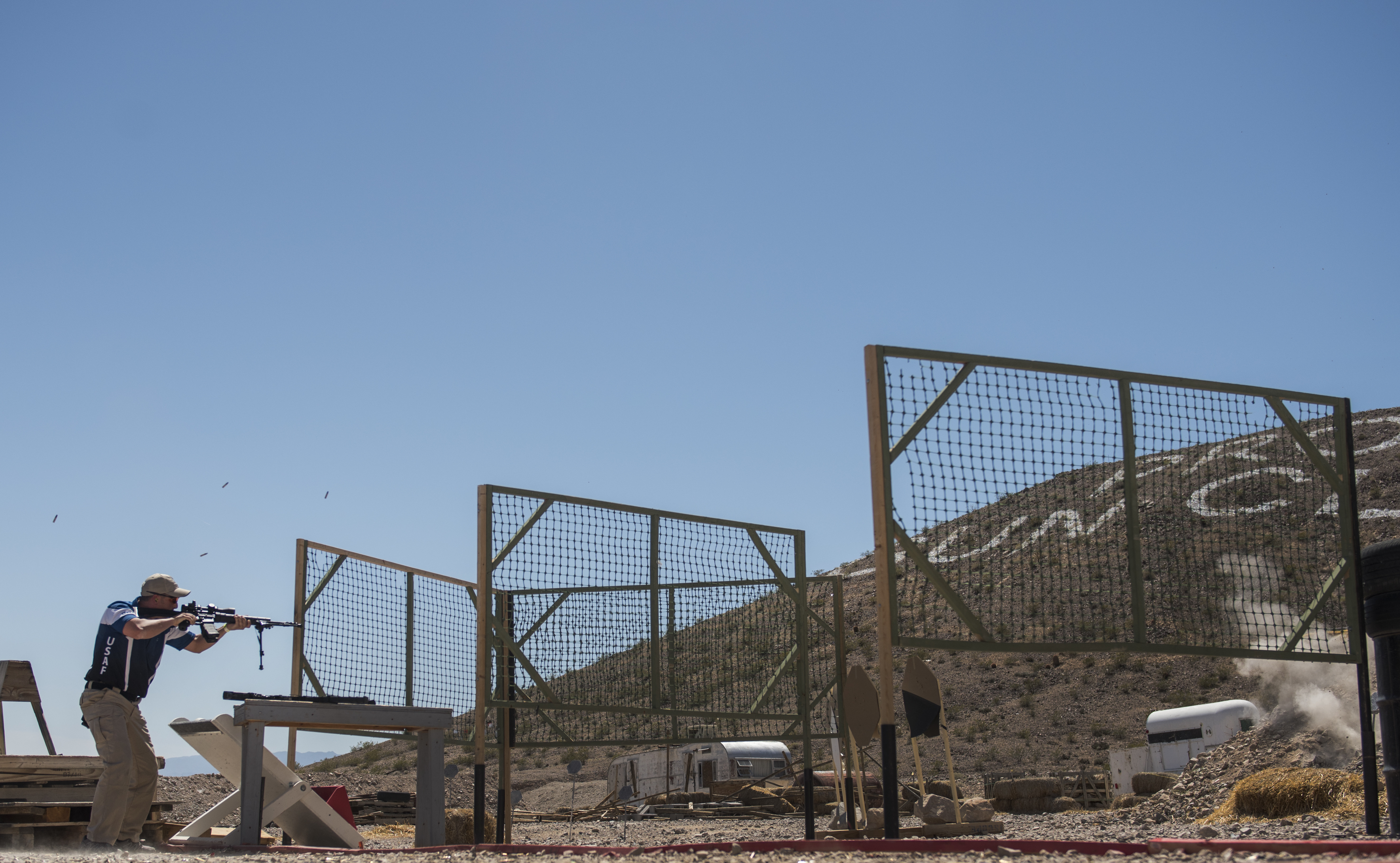
A competitor during a rifle stage at the 2018 USPSA Multigun Championship.

3-Gun competitions with handguns, rifles and shotguns have been organized in the U.S. since at least the Soldier of Fortune matches starting from 1979 in Missouri. Multigun competitions today take place from the small level in most local areas up to large annual national competitions.

The two large multigun sanctioning bodies in the U.S. are:

- United States Practical Shooting Association (USPSA)
- 3-Gun Nation (3GN)

The USPSA Multigun Championship has been held yearly since 1990. NBC Sports series 3-Gun Nation (3GN) has begun a professional series featuring the top 64 ranked shooters in the country competing in a points series culminating in a year-end shoot-off for $50,000. 3-Gun Nation today also has affiliate clubs in over ten countries.

Additionally, there are many "outlaw" matches, meaning there are no associated sanctioning body. "Outlaw" matches mainly use competition rules from either:

- International Multi-Gun Association (IMA), a ruleset offered by SMM3G, or
- United Multigun League (UML), a ruleset offered by the United Shooting Sports Leagues.

Some of the largest annual events include the Brownells Rockcastle Pro Am 3 Gun Championship, the USPSA Multigun Championship, the Rocky Mountain 3-Gun, the DPMS Tri-Gun Challenge, the Superstition Mountain Mystery 3-Gun (SMM3G) and the Larue Tactical Multigun Championship.

The International Defensive Pistol Association (IDPA) formerly also offered a 3-Gun ruleset.

== Equipment ==
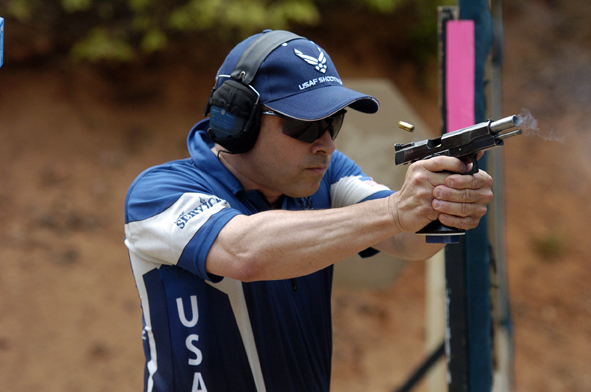
A Limited division competitor firing his handgun.

=== Power factor and calibers ===
In regular matches competitors can compete with any centerfire caliber they wish, as long as the power factor requirements are satisfied. Multigun in general has fewer division specific power factor requirements than USPSA/IPSC single gun matches. This means that anyone can be competitive with readily available factory ammunition in affordable calibers, and in practice almost all multigun competitors use handguns and Pistol Caliber Carbines (PCC) in 9×19mm minor handgun, .223 Rem minor rifle, and 12 gauge major shotgun. This way competitors don't have to worry about exotic calibers or handloading to achieve a perceived scoring advantage due to a power factor scoring handicap. All multigun associations also offer a separate Heavy division requiring larger calibers, like for instance a .45 ACP major handgun, .308 Win major rifle, and 12 gauge major shotgun. Some associations also have separate matches for .22 LR rimfire handguns and rifles.

=== Divisions ===
Divisions have become very specialized, but all rulesets offer roughly similar divisions with small variations under different names.

- IPSC: Open, Modified, Standard, Production.
- USPSA: Open, Tactical, Limited, Heavy Metal Tactical and Heavy Metal Limited.
- 3GN: Unlimited, Practical, Practical 308, Factory and Heavy.
- IMA: Open, Stealth 2 & 3 gun, Tactical, Limited and Heavy Metal.
- UML: Race (Open), Limited, Optics, Heavy, 2x4, PCR (Pistol Caliber Rifle), 2 Gun (Handgun and Rifle), and Ladies.

Open / Unlimited / Stealth / Race

Open was the largest division in multigun for many years, but was quickly surpassed by Tac Ops. All firearms may have compensators, ports and/or any number of optical sights. Any number of bipods and similar supporting devices may be used on the rifle and shotgun, and can be added or removed at any time.

Modified / Practical / Tactical Optics / Optics

This division usually has the largest match participation. Handguns and shotguns can only be iron sighted, while the rifle can be fitted with one optic with variable magnification as well as any number of iron sights. Compensators are not permitted, except for on the rifle where it must be within maximum dimensions of 1x3 in (25.4x76.2 mm), and bipods are not permitted.

Factory / Limited / Standard

This division is restricted to iron sights on handguns and shotguns. Rifles are restricted to one non-magnified optical sight, such as a 1x prism, holographic or red dot sight, and any number of iron sights. IPSC however limits Standard rifle to iron sights only. Compensators are not permitted, except for on the rifle where it must be within maximum dimensions of 1x3 in (25.4x76.2 mm), and bipods are not permitted.

Heavy / Practical 308

All multigun associations offer a separate Heavy division requiring larger major calibers. The handgun must often be a .45 ACP major caliber with maximum ten rounds capacity, the rifle must often be a .308 Win major caliber with power factor of minimum 360 kgr·ft/s (7.11 Ns), and the shotgun usually is required to be a manual 12 gauge pump. Rules vary some on rifle sights, with one scope of any variable magnification sometimes being permitted, only one non-magnified optic sometimes being permitted, or sometimes iron sights only.

=== Shooting carts ===
A shooting cart, also called range cart or gun cart, is a type of trolley used for transporting firearms and related equipment on the range. Since the sport requires a lot of equipment, which can amount to over 55 lb (25 kg) when accounting for items such as firearm and allied equipment, food, water, clothing and other personal gear, shooting carts are popular in multigun competitions for transporting equipment between stages. In addition to ready-made store-bought shooting carts, some use improvised shooting carts based on golf trolleys or baby strollers. Cross-country jogging strollers are particularly popular due to the bigger wheels making it easier to navigate on uneven gravel.

== Scoring ==
The score is based on both time and accuracy. The competitor's time is recorded electronically with a shot timer that detects the sound of the shots, giving the total time from the start signal until the last shot. Mainly two scoring methods are used, either Comstock or Time Plus. Most USPSA, 3GN and outlaw multigun matches use Time Plus scoring for faster scoring. This scoring method is faster, but has the drawback that if a competitor makes a time-consuming error on only one stage they may drop severely in the final match classification because the time scoring is cumulative. USPSA also has the possibility to use Comstock (Hit Factor) scoring, while IPSC uses Comstock only. With any of these methods the stage result is calculated based on both target scores and time used.

- With Comstock, targets hits are scored and points subtracted for misses and any other penalties. The points are then divided by time to give the hit factor which determines the number of stage points.
- With Time Plus, targets hits are ignored, but time added for misses and any other penalties.

Minor and major power factor are usually scored equal in regards to target scoring zone values, contrary to what is common in USPSA/IPSC single gun matches.

== Safety ==
The safety of all competitors, officials and spectators is always of the highest importance in competitions. Eye and ear protection is mandatory for both competitors and spectators. Multigun matches require some extra safety procedures compared to single gun matches due to the added element of transitioning between multiple firearms. When transitioning, both the used and new firearm must be in a safe condition, which means pointed in a safe direction with any applicable safety catch applied. Failure to comply will result in either a Stage or Match Disqualification (DQ) depending on the ruleset used.

== See also ==
- USPSA Multigun Championship
- Cowboy action shooting, a multigun variant characterized by an Old West theme, requiring the participants to dress in late 19th century period dress and use either original or reproduction "cowboy guns".
