= List of paintball markers =

The following is a list of notable paintball markers that have been, or are currently manufactured - ordered by manufacture in alphabetical order.

== Hopper-fed markers ==
Manufacturer	Name	Mechanism	Date manufacture	Caliber	Patents
ACI Paintball	F4 Illustrator				
ACI Paintball	Griffin				
ACI Paintball	Sinister				
A.T. Systems (Get Real Paintball)	AT-4			0.68 in	
A.T. Systems (Get Real Paintball)	AT-85			0.68 in	
Air Power	Vector			0.68 in	
Airgun Designs	Automag series			0.68 in	
Airgun Designs	Tac One			0.68 in	
Arrow Precision	Inferno Mk3			0.68 in	
Arrow Precision	Inferno Rec			0.68 in	
Arrow Precision	Inferno T3			0.68 in	
Arrow Precision	Sovereign	Auto-cocking		0.68 in	
Arrow Precision	Sterling Bronze			0.68 in	
Arrow Precision	Sterling STP			0.68 in	
Arrow Precision	Sterling Stock Class STP			0.68 in	
Azodin	Blitz	Mechanical stacked tube blowback		0.68 in	
Azodin	Kaos	Mechanical stacked tube blowback		0.68 in	
Azodin	Kaos Pump	Stacked-tube poppet valve pump		0.68 in	
Azodin	Zenith			0.68 in	
Brass Eagle	Avenger			0.68 in	
Brass Eagle	Avenger 2			0.68 in	
Brass Eagle	Afterburner			0.68 in	
Brass Eagle	Ambush	Pump Action		0.68 in	
Brass Eagle	Blade			0.68 in	
Brass Eagle	Blade 2			0.68 in	
Brass Eagle	Marauder			0.68 in	
Brass Eagle	Nightmare			0.68 in	
Brass Eagle	Rainmaker			0.68 in	
Brass Eagle	Raptor	Semi-automatic, stacked-tube blowback		0.68 in	
Brass Eagle	Sabre	Pump Action		0.68 in	
Brass Eagle	Sabre Twin Turbo	Pump Action		0.68 in	
Brass Eagle	Samurai			0.68 in	
Brass Eagle	Stingray			0.68 in	
Brass Eagle	Talon Ghost	Pump Action		0.68 in	
Brass Eagle	Tiger Shark	Pump Action		0.68 in	
Brass Eagle	Triton			0.68 in	
Brass Eagle	Triton 2			0.68 in	
BT Paintball	TM 7			0.68 in	
BT Paintball	TM 15			0.68 in	
BT Paintball	BT-4 Assault			0.68 in	
BT Paintball	BT-4 Banshee			0.68 in	
BT Paintball	BT-4 Combat			0.68 in	
BT Paintball	BT-4 Delta			0.68 in	
BT Paintball	BT-4 Delta Elite			0.68 in	
BT Paintball	BT-4 ERC			0.68 in	
BT Paintball	BT-4 Ironhorse			0.68 in	
BT Paintball	BT Omega			0.68 in	
BT Paintball	BT-4 S.W.A.T.			0.68 in	
Bob Long Technologies	Defiant			0.68 in	
Bob Long Technologies	Bob Long Intimidator marker			0.68 in	
Bob Long Technologies	BL Marq series			0.68 in	
Bob Long Technologies	G6r			0.68 in	
Bob Long Technologies	Vice			0.68 in	
Carter Machine	Comp			0.68 in	
Carter Machine	Mini Comp			0.68 in	
Carter Machine	Buzzard			0.68 in	
Carter Machine	Mini Buzzard			0.68 in	
Carter Machine	Desert Duck			0.68 in	
Carter Machine	Gecko Blaster			0.68 in	
Diablo	Mongoose			0.68 in	
Diablo	Mongoose LCD			0.68 in	
Diablo	Mongoose II Reincarnation LED			0.68 in	
Diablo	Mongoose II Reincarnation LCD			0.68 in	
Diablo	Wrath			0.68 in	
Dye Precision	DSR+			0.68 in	
Dye Precision	DSR			0.68 in	
Dye Precision	NT Series			0.68 in	
Dye Precision	Dye Matrix (DM) series			0.68 in	
Dye Precision	Proto Matrix series			0.68 in	
Dye Precision	Proto Rail series			0.68 in	
Dye Precision	Proto Reflex			0.68 in	
Dye Precision	Proto SLG			0.68 in	
Dangerous Power	G3			0.68 in	
Dangerous Power	G3 Spec-R			0.68 in	
Dangerous Power	G4			0.68 in	
Dangerous Power	Fusion			0.68 in	
Dangerous Power	Fusion F8			0.68 in	
Dangerous Power	Fusion FX			0.68 in	
Dangerous Power	Rev-i			0.68 in	
Dangerous Power	Threshold			0.68 in	
Deadlywind LLC	Aedes		Never produced		
Dlx Technology	Luxe			0.68 in	
Empire Paintball	Axe			0.68 in	
Empire Paintball	Dfender			0.68 in	
Empire Paintball	Mini			0.68 in	
Empire Paintball	Sniper		2012		
Empire Paintball	Resurrection Autococker	Auto-cocking	2013	0.68 in	
Evil	Minion				
Evil	Omen	Side-feeding stacked tube mechanical marker, similar to an Autococker			
Evil	Pimp				
Evil	Scion				
FASTech Paintball	F1 Illustrator				
FASTech Paintball	F2 Illustrator				
First Endeavour Paintball (FEP)	Quest				
GOG paintball	eNMEy				
GOG paintball	eNVy				
GOG paintball	eXTCy				
GOG paintball	G-1				
Indian Creek Designs	Alleycat				
Indian Creek Designs	BKO				
Indian Creek Designs	Bobcat				
Indian Creek Designs	Desert Fox				
Indian Creek Designs	Bushmaster 2000				
Indian Creek Designs	Freestyle				
Indian Creek Designs	Promaster				
Indian Creek Designs	Puma				
Indian Creek Designs	Thundercat				
JT Sports	Covert OPS				
JT Sports	ER2				
JT Sports	Impulse			0.68 in	
JT Sports	Excellerator				
JT Sports	Outkast				
JT Sports	Cybrid				
JT Sports	Raider				
JT Sports	Stealth				
JT Sports	Storm				
JT Sports	Tactical RTP				
JT Sports	Tac 5				
JT Sports	Cybrid				
Kingman Group	Spyder Classic Series				
Kingman Group	Spyder MR series				
Kingman Group	Spyder VS series				
Kingman Group	Hammer Pump marker				
Kingman Group	Hammer III Inline blowback				
Kingman Group	Kingman Training (KT) Eraser and Chaser			0.43 in	
Macdev	Cyborg				
Macdev	Drone DX				
Macdev	Droid				
Macdev	Clone				
Macdev	Clone VX				
Macdev	Clone GT				
Macdev	Clone GTi				
Macdev	Sonic Autococker				
Martin Paintball	Mini-Block Autococker				
MILSIG	Milsig Paradigim				
MILSIG	Milsig Paradigm II				
MILSIG	Milsig Elite				
MILSIG	Milsig Commando				
MILSIG	Milsig CQB				
MILSIG	Milsig CQB Pro				
MilTec	?				
Mokal	Fokus				
Mokal	Titan Mirage				
Mokal	Aura				
Paintball Inc.	GT-2000				
Paintball Inc.	GTV1				
Paintball Inc.	GTVe				
Paintball Inc.	GTF custom				
Paintball Inc.	E-1 Black Dragun				
Paintball Inc.	E-2 Black Dragun				
Palmer's Pursuit Shop	Blazer	Auto-cocking			
Palmer's Pursuit Shop	Pyre				
Palmer's Pursuit Shop	Painter				
Palmer's Pursuit Shop	Hurricane				
Palmer's Pursuit Shop	Grinder				
Palmer's Pursuit Shop	Stroker (Sheridan Conversion)				
Planet Eclipse	Ego series	Electropneumatic poppet-valve, stacked-tube configuration			
Planet Eclipse	Geo series				
Planet Eclipse	Etek series				
Planet Eclipse	Etha				
PGI Paintball	Mayhem				
PGI Paintball	Firestorm				
Pursuit Marketing, Inc. (PMI)	Black Maxx				
Pursuit Marketing, Inc. (PMI)	Piranha G2				
Pursuit Marketing, Inc. (PMI)	Piranha GTI				
Pursuit Marketing, Inc. (PMI)	Piranha				
Pursuit Marketing, Inc. (PMI)	Pro				
Pursuit Marketing, Inc. (PMI)	R6				
Pro-Team Products (PTP/Armson)	VMX (tuning-body for the Sheridan VM-68)				
Qian Wei	RAP99				
Real Action Paintball	T68 Paintball Marker				
Sheridan	XTS				
Sheridan	JTX				
Sheridan	Nemesis				
Sheridan	Equalizer				
Sheridan	P68AT				
Sheridan	VM-68				
Smart Parts	Ion series				
Smart Parts	Shocker				
Smart Parts	Smart Parts SP-8				
Smart Parts	Smart Parts Impulse Bankrupt 2009 See GOG or Lux				
Smart Parts	09 Smart Parts Impulse				
Smart Parts	NXT shocker				
Smart Parts	SFT Shocker				
Smart Parts	Ion				
Smart Parts	Ion XE				
Evolution					
Sport Arms Technology Corporation (SATCO)	SATCO 700				
System X	NME				
System X	NME LE				
System X	Xonix				
System X	Vengeance				
Tiberius Arms	T8.1 Pistol				
Tiberius Arms	T4 Rifle				
Tiberius Arms	T9 Rifle series				
Tiberius Arms	T9.1 Rifle series				
Tippmann Sports, LLC.	98 custom series			0.68 in	
Tippmann Sports, LLC.	Alpha Black series. AKA Bravo One			0.68 in	
Tippmann Sports, LLC.	Sierra One / Project Salvo			0.68 in	
Tippmann Sports, LLC.	Carver One	Semi-automatic, mechanical, inline blowback		0.68 in	
Tippmann Sports, LLC.	A-5 series	Semi-automatic, mechanical, inline blowback		0.68 in	
Tippmann Sports, LLC.	SL-68 II series			0.68 in	
Tippmann Sports, LLC.	Triumph	Semi-automatic, mechanical, inline blowback		0.68 in	
Tippmann Sports, LLC.	X7 series	Semi-automatic, mechanical, inline blowback		0.68 in	
Tippmann Sports, LLC.	Tippmann Gryphon	Semi-automatic, mechanical, inline blowback		0.68 in	
Tippmann Sports, LLC.	X7 Phenom	Blow-forward (Automag derivative)		0.68 in	
Tippmann Sports, LLC.	Pro-Lite	Semi-automatic, mechanical, inline blowback		0.68 in	
Tippmann Sports, LLC.	Pro-AM	Semi-automatic, mechanical, inline blowback		0.68 in	
Tippmann Sports, LLC.	Pro-Carbine	Semi-automatic, mechanical, inline blowback		0.68 in	
Tippmann Sports, LLC.	.68 Special	Semi-automatic, mechanical, inline blowback		0.68 in	
Tippmann Sports, LLC.	SMG-60	Semi- or fully automatic, fixed magazine-fed, inline blowback		0.62 in	
Tippmann Sports, LLC.	SMG-68	Fully automatic, detachable magazine-fed, inline blowback		0.68 in	
Vanguard	Creed				
Vanguard	Demon				
Warrior Paintball	Warrior 05				
Warrior Paintball	Warrior 06			0.68 in	
Warrior Paintball	Warrior 07			0.68 in	
Warrior Paintball	Warrior 08			0.68 in	
Warrior Paintball	Warrior 09			0.68 in	
Warrior Paintball	Warrior EW1			0.68 in	
WDP (now Angel Paintball Sports)	Angel series			0.68 in	
WGP Worr Games Products	Autococker	Mechanical Autococker		0.68 in	
WGP Worr Games Products	2006 Black Magic	Electronic Autococker		0.68 in	
WGP Worr Games Products	2004 Karnivor	Electronic Autococker		0.68 in	
WGP Worr Games Products	Jeff Orr Limited Edition (aka "JOLE" or "Jeff Orr Signature Series")	Electronic Autococker		0.68 in	
Worr Game Products	Trilogy Sport	Mechanical Autococker		0.68 in	
Worr Game Products	Trilogy Competition	Mechanical Autococker		0.68 in	
Worr Game Products	Trilogy Pro	Mechanical Autococker		0.68 in	
Worr Game Products	Worr Machine	Semi-automatic, stacked-tube blowback	2006?	0.68 in	
Worr Game Products	Worr Machine AG	Semi-automatic, stacked-tube blowback with pneumatically assisted trigger	2006?	0.68 in	
Worr Game Products	Worr Machine EG	Semi-automatic, stacked-tube blowback	2006?	0.68 in	
Worr Game Products	Worr Machine RG	Semi-automatic, stacked-tube blowback	2006?	0.68 in	
Worr Game Products	MG7			0.68 in	
Worr Game Products	Synergy	Electronically tripped stacked-tube blowback		0.68 in	
Planet Eclipse	Geo r5	Electronically spool valve operated		0.68 in	

== Pump & Stock Class markers ==
Pump markers are manually actuated between shots. Stock class markers substitute constant-air for a 12-gram powerlet and hopper for a feed tube.

Brand	Model	Caliber	Valve
Armson	Armson Stealth Pump	0.68 in	Inline
Brass Eagle	Raptor	0.68 in	Inline
Nelson	Nelspot 007	0.68 in	Inline
Carter	Boxgun	0.68 in	Inline
Carter	Desert Duck	0.68 in	Inline
NSG	Splatmaster	0.68 in	Inline
CCI	Phantom	0.68 in	Inline
CCI	Revolution	0.68 in	Inline
ACI	Hornet	0.68 in	Inline
ACI	Maverick	0.68 in	Inline
PMI	Trracer Tagmaster	0.68 in	Inline
PMI	Trracer	0.68 in	Inline
PMI	PG	0.68 in	Stacked Tube
PMI	PMI-I	0.68 in	Stacked Tube
PMI	PMI-IISC	0.68 in	Stacked Tube
PMI	PMI-IIDF	0.68 in	Stacked Tube
PMI	PMI Piranha SB	0.68 in	Stacked Tube
PMI	PMI Piranha LB	0.68 in	Stacked Tube
PMI	PMI Magnum	0.68 in	Stacked Tube
PMI	P-12	0.68 in	Stacked Tube
PMI	PMI Pursuit Pistol	0.68 in	Stacked Tube
PMI	K1	0.68 in	Stacked Tube Bolt action
PMI	K2	0.68 in	Stacked Tube Bolt action
PMI	KP2SC	0.68 in	Stacked Tube
PMI	KP2DF	0.68 in	Stacked Tube
PMI/Sheridan	KP3	0.68 in	Stacked Tube Bolt action
PMI/Sheridan	PGP	0.68 in	Stacked Tube
PMI/Sheridan	P68SC	0.68 in	Stacked Tube
Palmer's Pursuit Shop	Pug	0.68 in	Stacked Tube
Palmer's Pursuit Shop	Superstocker	0.68 in	Stacked Tube
Palmer's Pursuit Shop	Houndstooth	0.68 in	Stacked Tube
Palmer's Pursuit Shop	Painter	0.68 in	Stacked Tube
WGP	Ranger	0.68 in	Inline
WGP	Commando	0.68 in	Inline
WGP	Sniper	0.68 in	Stacked Tube
Empire BT	Sniper	0.68 in	Stacked Tube
Empire BT	Trracer	0.68 in	Inline
Lapco	Grey Ghost	0.68 in	Inline
Lapco	Grey Spirit	0.68 in	Inline
Lapco	Spectre	0.68 in	Inline
Lapco	Wrath	0.68 in	Inline
Lapco	Vamp	0.68 in	Inline
Lapco	Daystar	0.68 in	Inline
CCM	T2	0.68 in	Stacked Tube
CCM	S6	0.68 in	Stacked Tube
CCM	S6.5	0.68 in	Stacked Tube
CCM	S5	0.68 in	Stacked Tube
CCM	J2l	0.68 in	Stacked Tube
Metadyne	Thumper	0.68 in	Spool
Kingman	Hammer-7	0.68 in	Inline
Kingman	Hammer A	0.68 in	Inline
Kingman	Hammer P	0.68 in	Inline
Kingman	Hammer	0.68 in	Inline
Kingman	New Hammer	0.68 in	Inline
Kingman	Hammer II	0.68 in	Stacked Tube
Tippmann Sports, LLC.	C-3	0.68 in	Propane powered
Von Kampen Corporation	DD68 Redux marker	0.68 in	Inline
WWP	Razorback	0.68 in	Inline
WWP	Razorback II	0.68 in	Inline
WWP	Razorback III	0.68 in	Inline
Wintec	Thunderbolt	0.68 in	Inline

== Magazine-fed markers ==
Magazine designs include the RAP4/Tacamo (more-or-less interchangeable), Dye DAM mag and Kingman mag.

Manufacturer	Name	Mechanism	Date manufactured	Caliber	Patents	Magazine
Para Ordnance	Para Ordnance Mod 85	Semi/Full-Auto	1985	.375 Dye Marking 85		Spyder 10-rnd Magazine
Kingman Group	Spyder MRX	Semi-Auto Neumatics	2012	0.68		Spyder 10-rnd Magazine

== Pistols ==
Pistols are designed to be fired one-handed. They are almost always magazine-fed and powered by 12-gram CO_{2} cartridges, though hopper and constant-air adapters may be available.

Brand	Model	Caliber	Action
Psycho Ballistics	Delta 68	0.68 in	Blowback
32 Degrees	PT Enforcer	0.68 in	Blowback
32 Degrees	PT Xtreme	0.68 in	Blowback
32 Degrees	PT Professional	0.68 in	Blowback
32 Degrees	PT Punisher	0.68 in	Blowback
AGA	AGA 62	0.62 in	Double Action
Airgun Designs	Sydarm	0.68 in	Blow-forward
Ariakon	ACP	0.68 in	Blowback
Ariakon	Overlord	0.68 in	Blowback
Armotech	Zeus G1	0.68 in	Blowback
Armotech	Zeus G2	0.68 in	Blowback
Armotech	Core ZX	0.68 in	Blowback
BT	SA-17	0.68 in	Blowback
Crosman	3357	0.50 in	Double Action
FASTech	Armed Forces Trainer (AFT)	0.68 in	Blowback
JT	ER 2	0.68 in	Pump
Kingman	Eraser	0.43 in	Blowback
Kingman	Chaser	0.43 in	Blowback
NSG	Splatmaster Rapide	0.68 in	Double Action
Palmers Pursuit Shop	Squall	0.68 in	Autococking
Palmers Pursuit Shop	Micro Squall	0.68 in	Autococking
PMI	Pirahna USP	0.68 in	Blowback
RAM	X50	0.43 in	Blowback
RAM	17	0.43 in	Blowback
RAM	226	0.43 in	Blowback
RAM	P99	0.43 in	Blowback
RAP4	T68 Pistol	0.68 in	Blowback
RAP4	Desert Eagle	0.43 in	Blowback
Tiberius Arms	T8 / T8.1	0.68 in	Blow-forward
Tippmann Sports, LLC.	TPX	0.68 in	Blow-forward
Tippmann Sports, LLC.	TiPX	0.68 in	Blow-forward
WarSensor	WSP	0.68 in	Blowback
Warsensor/Miltec	Zeus G1	0.68 in	Blowback
Warsensor/Miltec	Zeus G2	0.68 in	Blowback

== Human-powered ==
.50 cal is common among low-cost mass-produced designs, as the projectiles only require ~1/3 as much energy to fire, compared to .68 cal.

Brand	Model	Caliber	Power Source
JT	Splatmaster Z100	0.50 in	Spring
JT	Splatmaster Z200	0.50 in	Spring
Splatmatic	ThunderSplat	0.50 in	Spring
Splatmatic	PistolSplat	0.50 in	Spring
Airowgun	Airow Gun	0.68 in	Bow
