= Ion (paintball marker) =

Smart Parts Ion
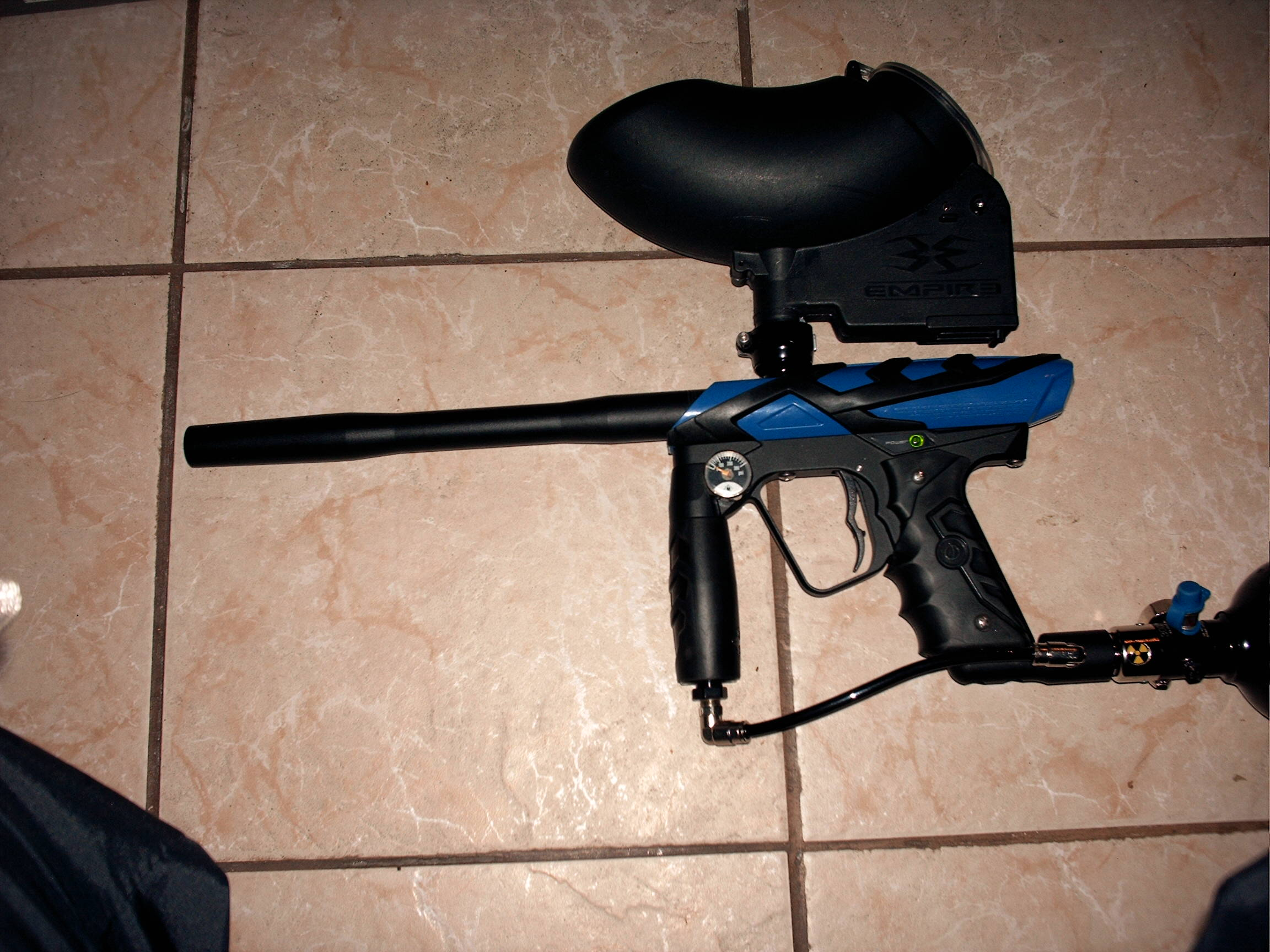
- Smart Parts Ion

Specifications
- Type: Spool-Valve Electropneumatic
- Action: Semi-Automatic, Rebound, Three-Round Burst, Full-Automatic
- Barrel: 12 inch ported
- Bore: .689
- Rate of fire: 17 balls per second

The Ion is an electropneumatic paintball marker manufactured by Smart Parts. At the time of its release, the Ion was the first fully electropneumatic marker aimed at entry-level players, at a price point similar to Spyders and other mechanical blowbacks. The Ion has generally been credited with making high-rate-of-fire electropneumatic markers generally available, at a time when electropneumatic markers were considered out of reach of most casual or budget players.

The original Ion was released in 2005, and soon soared in popularity, though it was often criticized for being difficult to disassemble and service. Smart Parts addressed these concerns in 2007 with the release of the Ion XE, which allows the bolt to be removed from the back of the marker.

== Features ==
The Ion's receiver consists of a breech and firing chamber, both hard-anodized. Its grip frame and ASA are both made of die-cast aluminum and are powder-coated. The outer shell of the Ion is polymer. The Ion includes the Vision system, or eyes, an infrared emitter and receiver on either side of the chamber. This prevents the Ion from firing when a ball is not fully loaded in the chamber, reducing the number of "chopped" balls.

The Ion is highly customizable: it is sheathed in a removable polymer shell, which comes in several different colors. This shell can also be replaced with aftermarket "body kits" to change the appearance of the Ion, similar to the kits available for the Tippmann A5 marker and others. These body kits also affect the performance of the gun and accessibility of the bolt. Body kits such as the lucky and deadlywinds are BOB (bolt out the back), and allow easy access and cleaning of the bolt. In addition to these body kits, several aftermarket replacement parts such as triggers and feednecks are available.

The Ion board is manufactured in two forms: one intended for distribution in the United States, and another for distribution in the United Kingdom. The UK version of the board does not have burst or fully automatic firing modes and is identified by the green power LED. The US version of the board includes all firing modes and has a red power LED. This board can also be replaced with a number of aftermarket boards (such as Blackheart or Virtue boards) which offer greater control over the timing of the firing action, different firing modes, and a higher maximum rate of fire, in most cases limited only by the mechanical capabilities of the marker itself.

Due to the large number of aftermarket upgrades available, the Ion can be customized or used stock to hold its own in today's fast-paced speedball tournaments. It can also be made into a competent woodsball marker.

== Operation ==
Internally, the Ion features a spool-valve design, similar to a Shocker SFT or a Dye Matrix. However, the operation of the Ion is somewhat simpler than a Shocker SFT or Matrix in that it does not use a 4-way solenoid valve. The Ion's solenoid valve only has three hoses: one to provide air to the solenoid, one to provide air to a reservoir chamber behind the bolt, and the other which provides air to the front of the bolt to hold it back while the marker is at rest. The solenoid thus directs air either to the front of the bolt when not firing, or to the air reservoir behind the bolt, to blow it forward.

When the Ion is fired, the air in front of the bolt that holds it back is drained back through the solenoid, which causes the air in the rear of the firing chamber to blow the bolt forward. In order to expedite the draining of air from the front of the bolt, many users add a quick exhaust valve (QEV) to their marker. The QEV replaces a fitting on the Ion's body and allows the draining air to vent into the body cavity instead of passing all the way back through the solenoid. By allowing the air to vent faster, this allows the bolt to close faster and with more force, which permits lower operating pressure and dwell (the time the solenoid valve is open). The QEV also acts as a trap for excess grease that might otherwise enter the solenoid and cause problems.

Two other markers manufactured by Smart Parts, the SP-8 and the Epiphany, are based on the Ion's spool-valve design.
