= Gun F/X Tactical Development =

Gun f/x Tactical Development is an R&D firm serving the paintball industry. It was founded as Gun f/x in 1994 as a spin-off of Pro-Team Products, Inc.

== Overview ==
Gun f/x Tactical Development developed a paintball-based force-on-force simulated M16 rifle training system. They are also involved in the design and development of Non-Lethal Weapons, Improvised Explosive Device training devices, and recoil simulators for firearms marksmanship training. The company is currently based in Maine and is associated with Armson USA, Pro-Team Products, and Pro-Team Manufacturing, a Florida-based CNC facility that produces the majority of their products. The company has been issued several patents for pneumatic devices that create air pressure.

== Products ==
=== CAR 68 ===
The paintball-based M16 simulator is designated to the CAR 68. The CAR 68 has been used by military and law enforcement entities including the Israeli military, US Marine Corps, US Army, Secret Service, Latvian Special Forces, and Navy Seal teams. The CAR68 training weapon simulates the look, feel and performance characteristics of the standard duty weapon. The primary limitation of the CAR 68 is its effective range, which is restricted to a maximum of approximately 200 feet. The simulator is therefore mainly utilized in training scenarios in which range is not the factor such as Close Quarters Battle drills, urban combat (in which most fighting is done within structures), police encounter training (road stops, suspect take-down), and similar close-range situations. The CAR 68 was also adapted for use as a recoil simulator for marksmanship training with laser based target system such as Beamhit and others. The company has also developed weapons simulators for the Heckler & Koch MP5, M203 grenade launcher and LAWS anti-tank weapon, though none of these devices is in wide distribution.

=== Non-lethal ===
Following the introduction of the CAR68, Gun f/x was approached by the Monterey Bay Corporation to provide concept and development for a less-lethal projectile launcher for use by military and law enforcement. Working with Airgun Designs, this project produced the concept less-lethal weapon known as the UTPBS, which eventually became FN Herstal's FN 303. This design could be attached to an M16 rifle and was conceived as a less-lethal weapon coupled with a lethal weapon system, providing a wide range of response capabilities that were immediately available. A stand-alone version was also developed. The UTPBS also featured a rotating barrel magazine, allowing for a wide range of different projectiles to be available and selectable without the need to change magazines. The company is currently working on further development of the burst disc concept, as well as a variety of less-lethal weapons and simulators.

In conjunction with the UTPBS development project, Gun f/x Tactical Development was also tasked with developing a projectile for the system. The "bismuth round" (so-called due to the inclusion of bismuth for added mass that was required for extended range) and others including training and marking rounds were developed in conjunction with Perfect Circle Paintballs, which currently manufactures pepperballs and other specialty projectiles.

In 2002, the company began work on "burst disc technologies" - various methods for producing the rapid release of a high volume of pressurized gas. The technology allows for the simulation of weapon systems that produce high decibel reports and are capable of discharging projectiles (or other payloads such as smoke simulation powders, marking dyes, etc.) with a greater mass than a standard paintball.

=== IED Simulators ===
Gun f/x has also developed Improvised Explosive Device and Mine Training Simulators The IED and mine simulators have been used to train troops in the deployment, detection, and disarming of mines and IEDs in Iraq and Afghanistan. The IED and mine simulators utilize a 12 gram CO_{2} cartridge and frangible burst cup. The devices are used with an inert talc powder that gives off a smoke effect. Both designs give a concussive report in the 100 decibel range, which simulates the sound made by real IEDs and mines. Both models can be configured for remote command detonation.
