= Cybrid (disambiguation) =

Cybrid may refer to:

- Cybrids (medical), a cytoplasmic hybrid
- Cybrids, a race of artificially intelligent machines in the Earthsiege computer game universe
- Cybrid, an artificial intelligence in a human body in the Hyperion Cantos novels of Dan Simmons
- Cybrid, a comic book character published by Maximum Press
- Cybrid, a brand of paintball marker
