= Airsmith =

An airsmith is a gunsmith that services, repairs or modifies airguns rather than firearms. The term is most commonly applied to those who work on paintball guns (often called markers) but can also apply to those who service pellet or BB guns.

== About ==
=== Paintball ===
There are four types of airsmiths: gun techs, certified gun techs, airsmiths, and certified airsmiths. A gun tech is someone that knows enough about paintball guns to be able to disassemble, reassemble, and trouble shoot any marker. Gun smiths are located at every paintball store. A certified gun tech has these same skills but has also attended courses put on by the marker's manufacturers to work their guns. Most airsmiths will fit into either of these two categories.

A true airsmith is a gun tech and also a machinist. This means they are able to make a marker from scratch. If there is a problem with the a marker, a true airsmith should be able to make a replacement piece. A certified airsmith is an airsmith who has obtained a gun tech certificate from the manufacturer. However, gun techs cannot make new parts, only replace existing parts with pre-made ones.

=== Airsoft ===
The term "airsmith" may also apply to those who work on Airsoft guns. Airsmiths work on Airsoft firearms ranging from AEG's (Airsoft Electric Gun), Green Gas/CO_{2} guns, and springers such as bolt action snipers and shotguns. Airsoft Airsmiths provide upgrade and repair services, build custom guns, and manufacture other popular Airsoft firearms.

== Equipment ==
A true airsmith uses a lathe, milling machine, and surface grinder. Most paintball gun stores cannot afford to buy this type of equipment hence why most do not have it.
