= T68 =

T68 may refer to:

- Firema T-68, a light rail vehicle
- Hunter T 68, a British-built trainer aircraft
- Hypothermia (ICD-10 code)
- INS Baratang, a patrol vessel of the Indian Navy
- Sony Ericsson T68, a mobile phone
- T68 Paintball Marker
