= Tippmann TPX =

Type of Paintball marker

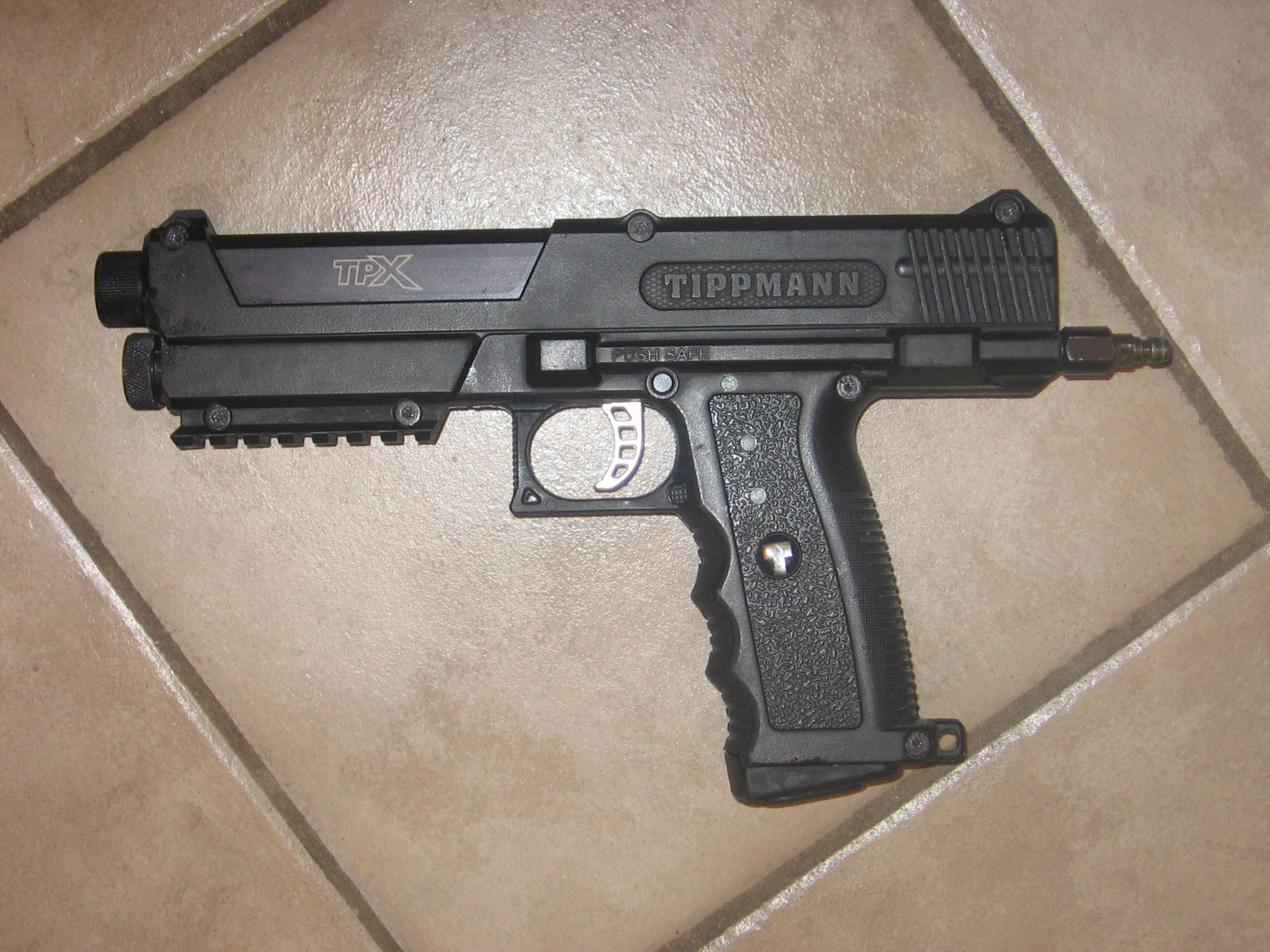
- Tippmann TPX/TiPX magazine fed paintball pistol.

Specifications
- Type: Mechanical
- Action: Semi-Automatic
- Barrel: 6.25 in (15.875 cm)
- Bore: .68 in (17.272 mm)
- Rate of fire: 8 balls per second

The TPX/TiPX is a magazine fed paintball pistol made by Tippmann. New to the paintball pistol market, Tippmann released the TPX in 2009. This paintball marker uses an air system that allows for 12 gram CO_{2} cartridges to be placed underneath the barrel. This was meant to eliminate bulk in the grip of the marker caused by placing the CO_{2} cartridge in the magazines. In 2011, Tippmann changed the name of the pistol to the TiPX to market all the improved parts at that time, as well as differentiate it from the TPX baseball line by Louisville Slugger.

== Features ==
The TPX pistol is designed to include many features not included on many .68 caliber paintball pistols. It competes with Tiberius Arms in the .68 caliber magazine fed pistol market.

=== Under Barrel Air Cartridge ===
The Tippmann TPX features an area underneath its barrel for the operator to place 12 gram CO_{2} cartridges that provide velocity for paintballs to be shot out of the pistol. In this chamber the CO_{2} cartridge is held in place by a quarter turn cap that twists clockwise into place. The TPX punctures this cartridge when the user pulls the trigger of the marker for the first time, although there have been troubles reported with this feature. The purpose of this design is to remove the cartridge from the paintball magazines. Removing the air cartridge from the magazine is meant to eliminate bulk from the pistol grip allowing it to be easier to hold.

=== Magazines ===
Tippmann's TPX pistol is their first .68 caliber paintball pistol that is designed to feed paintballs using magazines. Magazines made for the TPX pistol were designed to hold eight paintballs originally, but are now sent with a newly designed seven paintball configuration to prevent breaks. These are loaded with a spring that when released forces paintballs into the chamber of the pistol, allowing the TPX to be fed from the bottom up, as opposed to traditional paintball markers that are fed from the top down with the assistance of gravity. This spring must be compressed before loading paintballs into the magazine, and when loaded into the marker will be released automatically to start feeding paintballs into the TPX chamber. Upon a press of the magazine release button, the TPX ejects the loaded magazine with a push from a spring.

=== Metal Trigger ===
To add stability to the initial puncture of the CO_{2} cartridge Tippmann designed the trigger of the TPX pistol out of cast zinc (with a nickel-plated finish). After insertion of a 12 gram CO_{2} cartridge one pull of this trigger will puncture it allowing for the CO_{2} to enter the gun to be used to propel the paintballs.

=== Covered Ammo Windows ===
Ammunition windows allow the user of the TPX to view paintballs as they are inside the grip of the pistol. The TPX includes this feature. Holes are made in the sides of the pistol grip, and in the top of the marker above the magazine to create ammunition windows. These are covered with clear plastic to protect the paint inside the marker from external elements.

=== Picatinny Rail ===
Directly underneath the 12 gram CO_{2} cartridge chamber on the TPX there is a picatinny rail. Rails similar to this are found on numerous paintball markers, and are designed in order to attach accessories such as tactical lights or laser pointers.

=== Lanyard Clip ===
At the back bottom corner of the grip of the Tippmann TPX pistol is featured a circular cut-out designed to string a lanyard through. Attaching a lanyard allows the user of the paintball pistol to string the marker to their wrist in order to keep from losing it.

== Operation ==
The Tippmann TPX operates on an open bolt blow-forward action system.

=== Propellant ===
To insert a 12 gram CO_{2} cartridge into the marker turn the quarter turn cap counter-clockwise, then pull out, and then counter-clockwise again. Insert the cartridge narrow side first, then return the cap to its original position with two turns clockwise. The cartridge will not puncture until the trigger is pulled. This first pull however, will not fire the marker.

To use a remote air source a remote line adapter must be installed. This feature requires that an empty 12 gram CO_{2} cartridge be in place before a remote hose can be used with the TPX paintball pistol. Attachment of the remote air source depends on the remote line being used and is compatible with standard lines.

=== Loading ===
To load the TPX, first push the magazine follower tab down until it clicks into place with the spring compressed. Next while keeping the magazine vertical, insert paintballs one at a time until there are eight or with the Tru-Feed magazine(7) in the magazine. The paintballs should align in an alternating pattern with the very bottom ball being closest to the front. When this magazine is loaded into the grip of the marker the spring will automatically decompress forcing a paintball into the chamber.

=== Preparing to Fire ===
Unlike the traditional paintball marker, the TPX uses a blow forward action. To prepare this action for fire the operator must simply pull the trigger back once. This initial pull will not fire the marker, but trigger pulls performed after it will until all air is removed from the marker.

== Upgrades and Modifications ==
In order to enhance the performance of the TPX pistol Tippmann as well as other companies have designed aftermarket upgrades and modifications for the marker.

=== Remote Line Adapter ===
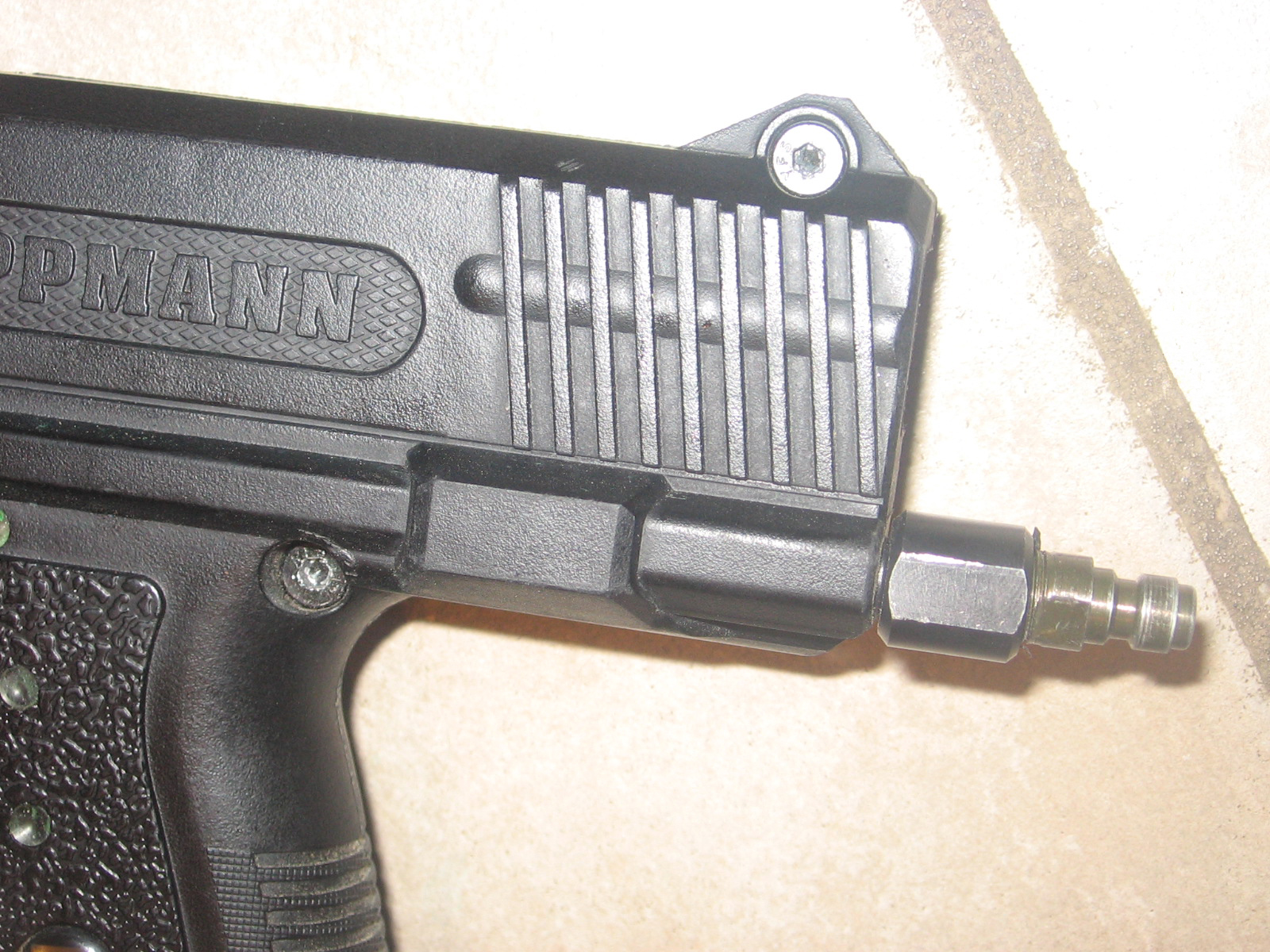
A photo showing the position of the remote line adapter on the Tippmann TPX paintball marker

While the marker is designed to use 12 gram CO_{2} cartridges as its propellant, a remote line adapter can be installed in order to hook the TPX up to an external air source. Use of a remote line with the TPX increases the amount of air supply the marker has at one time by allowing larger sources of air to be used with the marker. Installation of this modification requires internal parts to be replaced in order to allow the air flow from the 12 gram CO_{2} cartridge to change and be redirected. This modification also requires a small piece in the back of the marker to be taken out. In order for this upgrade to function properly a used or empty 12 gram CO_{2} cartridge must be in place in the chamber underneath the barrel. Most remote lines are compatible with the TPX remote line adapter modification, and the connection of the line depends on the model of remote hose being used.

=== Extra Magazines ===
Tippmann includes in their basic TPX pistol package two magazines. Extra magazines made by Tippmann can be bought in pairs, and provide for more paintballs to be carried without having to reload the magazines on the field. Each magazine is exactly the same as the two provided with the stock marker, and are loaded and used the same.

=== After-market barrels ===
Traditionally, after-market barrels are designed for most paintball markers. Tippmann's TPX is no exception, as there have been numerous barrels made to modify the performance and accuracy of the marker. After-market barrels are often used to enhance accuracy. Hammerhead has designed a rifled barrel that is compatible with the TPX. BT's APEX barrel can also be used with the TPX paintball pistol, and is designed to enhance distance and accuracy, and propel paintballs around obstacles. Other after-market barrels made for the TPX are designed to enhance the aesthetic appeal of the marker such as RAP4's silencer barrel. All TPX barrels are also compatible with the Tippmann A-5 and Tippmann X7 markers as the threading of these barrels is all the same.

== Recalls ==
- As of 2009 no recalls have been announced for the TPX pistol.
- A noteworthy free upgrade for the TPX CO_{2} puncturing system can be found on Tippmann's web page. This upgrade is sent to TPX owners having trouble puncturing CO_{2} cartridges with the first pull of the trigger. This kit includes an adjustable set screw to allow for different lengths of 12 gram CO_{2} cartridges to be used with the marker, as well as a new puncture pin.

== Criticisms ==
Within the first year of its production, the Tippmann has received numerous complaints about the CO_{2} puncturing system not working correctly. Many TPX operators have had issues making the first pull of the TPX trigger puncture the inserted 12 gram CO_{2} cartridge.

== See also ==
- Paintball
- Woodsball
- Paintball marker
- Paintball pistol
- Tippmann
