= Smart Parts =

American company

- Defunct: 2010
- Fate: Liquidation; Assets and IP acquired by Kee Action Sports
- Headquarters: Latrobe, Pennsylvania

Smart Parts was a paintball manufacturing company in Latrobe, Pennsylvania, which filed for liquidation on July 28, 2010. As of August 22, 2010 Smart Parts' assets and intellectual property were acquired by Kee Action Sports.

== Products ==
Smart Parts was a producer of paintball markers and accessories. Their first product was the Smart Parts aluminium one-piece barrel made for the Tippmann 68 Special and the PMI-3 semi automatic markers. This barrel had a standard bore with a spiral drilled venting system in the end of the barrel. The design supposedly improved accuracy by decreasing turbulence as the paintball exited the barrel, and also decreased noise produced by the gun upon firing. The later All-American Barrel was a two-piece barrel system using spiral porting and a front bore diameter of 68 caliber. In the early to mid-1990s Smart Parts' products ranged from barrels and clothing to a few generic accessories along with some marker specific ones (such as parts for the AirGun Designs Automag series).

=== Barrel system ===
Smart Parts produced The Freak paintball marker barrel system that can accommodate almost any size bore diameter paintball. The Freak kit comes standard with eight barrel inserts of different sizes: .679, .682, .684, .687, .689, .691, .693, and .695. In addition to the inserts, the kit includes the Freak case and the Freak back piece. The front barrel piece is sold separately in various lengths to accommodate all barrel sizes.

=== Markers ===
==== pneuVentures Shocker & Shocker Sport ====
In 1990, Smart Parts produced their first in-house marker. Called the Boss, the Smart Parts pump marker featured a spiral ported barrel and a 'shoebox' style body (which would be mirrored in their first electronic gun design); The Boss was targeted at high-end woodsball tournament players but was not well-received, being considered to be too heavy and too large (when compared to offerings such as the Carter Comp or LAPCO Grey Ghost). The Boss was withdrawn from the market and Smart Parts concentrated on producing customized versions of other manufacturer's markers until 1996 when Smart Parts began selling their first electronic marker, the Shocker. This marker was manufactured by a company called pneuVentures, but sold exclusively through Smart Parts. This original Shocker was a dual-solenoid, closed bolt, hammerless marker that was large, heavy, inefficient, and could fire a maximum speed of nine shots per second. A couple thousand of these were sold over the course of its lifetime. Other companies that had been working on their own electronic markers also released them about the same time (WDP Angel – 1996, Brass Eagle Rainmaker – 1997).

The pneuVentures Shocker was sold until 1997 when Smart Parts redesigned it and started producing it themselves. This redesigned marker, which became known as the Shocker Sport, was released in 1998. It included a number of major revisions to the original design, including a more lightweight profile, improved electronics and grounding, a faster cycling set of internals, and better solenoids. The Shocker Sport was sold from 1998 to 2002, and the design of its external look changed a few times during that period. A few companies even released their own customized versions, mainly the Planet Eclipse Shocker (which was manufactured by Smart Parts for the company Planet Eclipse, which at the time did not make any markers of their own). Another customized Shocker was the SL Shocker from HyperSportWorks.

Shocker Sports were the first factory marker to feature an enhanced firing mode, which later became known as "ramping". This firing mode was called Turbo mode by Smart Parts, and involved a firing program whereby the user would pull the trigger around five times per second, and the marker's actual firing speed would increase to over nine shots per second. This type of firing mode was largely unheard-of in the industry at the time, so people were conflicted about its use. Turbo mode became illegal to use in tournaments and on some open-play recreational games due to the obvious advantage it gave the user. After the turn of the century, ramping modes have become more and more popular, and many markers come with them as stock from the factory. As a result, the use of ramping modes has become more mainstream, and is allowed in some recreational games and some tournaments. However, this varies from game to game and tournament circuit to circuit, so it is still disallowed by many fields.

==== Impulse ====
Smart Parts Impulse box

The Impulse was released in the year 2000 and was the sister design to SP's other marker available at the time, the Shocker Sport. Over the course of its lifetime the Impulse became one of the most popular markers available, and was notable for following many trends for parts, style, and features in the paintball industry on the turn of the century.

Impulses had a similar appearance to the Shocker Sport, however they were internally quite different; Impulses were based on the common "stacked-tube" hammer/valve layout (two bore design, bolt on top with the hammer on bottom). In contrast to the Shocker Sport, Impulses were capable of faster fire rates, were more lightweight, were cheaper, and also experienced greater tank efficiency. As a result, the gaining popularity of this product over the Shocker was foreseeable. Impulses were one of many stacked-tube electronic markers developed around the same time by opposing companies. Markers such as this were considered to be the top-end by many players (typically those involved with tournaments), and as a result the cost for upgraded versions was quite high ($1000+).

In 2001, Smart Parts released a variety of upgrades and enhancements to the Impulse line, including the Vision eye system, upgraded bolts, improved valves and internals, and other smaller upgrade components. The Vision electronic eye system was particularly popular since few other markers were available with such a part from the factory (this has since changed, and the feature is a near-requirement from manufacturers). In 2002, the electronics were redesigned to the "Cricket" version, which involved a more reliable circuit board that also used more developed programming.

The other growing trend that Impulses followed were the addition of stylish milling patterns and designs, suited for different retailers and sponsored teams. This has become a popular trend for the more expensive markers of today. There were over 30 customized body styles and parts available known as "Private Labels" before the marker was discontinued. Contingent to this was the growing number of parts and accessories available for the Impulse line as well, from various manufacturers and developers, which allowed nearly every part of the marker to be swapped for an "aftermarket" version. The serial number of the marker is located on the right-hand side towards the back.

List of Private Label Impulses:

- Python Impulse
- SIC Impulse
- Atomix Impulse
- Atomix TRIBAL Impulse
- Ca$h Money Impulse
- Ton Ton Impulse
- Meteor Impulse
- Adrenalin Impulse
- RAT Impulse
- Predator Impulse
- Freak Factory Impulse
- Nasty Impulse
- Game Face Impulse
- Demonic Impulse
- Strange Vision Impulse
- Toxic Impulse
- AVI Impulse
- 32º Impulse
- Shocktech SFL Impulse
- Hotrod Impulse
- Eclipse Impulse
- Mouse Impulse
- Tiger Impulse
- Fireball Mountain Gothic Impulse
- Fireball Mountain Factory Impulse
- Fireball Mountain Razzor Impulse
- Evil Impulse
- Dark Impulse
- Neurotic Sports Edition Impulse
- VooDoo Impulse
- Hyperpulse
- Blizzard Impulse

In 2009 Smart Parts released another Impulse, a high-end marker that used the ram driven operation of the Ego and Intimidator. It incorporated several features used by Smart Parts' highest-end marker, the DLX Luxe, such as an internal gas system.

==== Shocker SFT & Shocker NXT ====
The year 2003 brought several new markers and products from Smart Parts, due to a reshuffling of design engineers. The most notable new product from this time period was the Shocker 03 marker (whose name soon after became Shocker SFT). The Shocker SFT was a redesigned marker that used a single solenoid open bolt, cock valve operation capable of high firing speeds, small body size, but an average efficiency without a Smart Parts High Efficiency Bolt. Although this marker was given the name "Shocker", it actually shares virtually no design aspects with its namesake the older Shocker Sport. However, Smart Parts decided to call it the next-generation "Shocker" for marketing purposes, since the older Shockers were already discontinued.

Ever since having been released in July 2003, the Shocker SFT has remained the premier Smart Parts marker, representing top-of-the-line performance and reliability. Shockers have been chosen by the majority of Smart Parts' sponsored teams since their release. The Shocker's popularity also brought along many upgrades and customized versions, available from various manufacturers and developers, similar to its older brother the Impulse. Base-model Shockers currently retail around $700, with the more customized "private label" version around $1000 or more (depending on the model).

In late 2006 (sometimes described as 2007 for simplicity) the Shocker SFT was redesigned into the newer "Shocker NXT" version, which is the same internal marker as the SFT, except it uses upgraded parts from the factory, and has a few enhancements to the frame, in-line regulator, and other parts of the marker to increase performance and reliability. The cosmetics were also changed to reflect the new internals. Some Shocker SFT parts are no longer compatible with the newer Shocker NXT model. This includes barrel threads, as the NXT uses the same threads as the Ion and Impulse. There are several other parts that may not be compatible, including the trigger, and vertical ASA.

Private Label Shockers Include: (SFT)

- Octane
- Nasty
- Tremor
- Strange Vision
- Shocktech
- Toxic
- Dynasty
- 06 Dynasty
- Ton Ton
- Dark
- Hybrid
- Freeflow
- Russian Legion
- OWL Sharks
- Miami effect

==== Nerve ====
The other new-to-2003 Smart Parts marker was called the Nerve. It has since been discontinued. Nerves are a next-generation Impulse design, featuring a smaller and lighter profile, improved internals, upgraded and streamlined components from the factory, and a sleeker external look. It shares many parts that are interchangeable with the shocker, however it uses a different platform for operation. When Nerves were first released (several months late due to manufacturing and development issues), it was designed to be Smart Parts flagship "no upgrades needed" marker. It came packed with Smart Parts best accessories. The high-end features resulted in the MSRP costing $1200 for the base model, or $1500 for the upgraded package with HPA tank included. The reasoning for this was based on the previous customized Impulse markers, which retailed for $1000+, however the Nerve's high price tag did not fare as well with the public. This was partially because public trends were already shifting away from the stacked-tube hammer/valve markers which the Nerve was based from, and toward more advanced designs such as the Shocker, Dye Matrix line, and others (this trend proceeded through 2004). To combat this, Nerve price was dropped a few months later to $1000, then again to $850. At this point Nerves were finally gaining popularity as originally expected, however one final blow was dealt to the Nerve which would put it away – the release of the Ion (below). In late 2005 SP produced an additional large batch of Nerve parts, however after this the line was halted and the marker was unofficially discontinued in light of other products.

==== Ion/Ion XE ====
In March 2005, Smart Parts released their most popular marker, the Ion. The development, production, and eventual release of this product were completely unanticipated due to being conducted in relative secrecy by Smart Parts. As a result, when the Ion became available it was an immediate hit in both sales, demand, and expectations.

The Ion was the trend starter for a new marketing idea in the paintball industry, whereby relatively high-performance parts would be sold after the absolute lowest price markup, thus allowing the product (Ion) to be sold for an extremely reasonable price. The Ion uses similar principals in design to the higher-performance Shocker marker, however several key factors to the Ion design were altered to allow it a drastic reduction in production cost (allowing the low MSRP price tag for the end-user). In particular, the Ion was cheaper to produce due to its modular body/exoskeleton design, newly designed inexpensive solenoid, and use of internal air tubing instead of machined manifold ports like high-end markers. These, combined with a reasonably low markup in price for retailers, allowed the Ion to debut with an MSRP of $275. The MSRP was later reduced to $200 for about a year-long period, but was increased back up to $225 at a later time. It was again reduced back down to $200.

The Ion has quickly become one of the most popular markers available, selling over 100,000 units in a one-year period, a feat which few if any paintball markers has ever done to date; some markers that have been available for over a decade have not been able to match these numbers. The release of this marker dealt a noticeable blow to competing products across the globe, and was so strong that it even affected the resale and demand of used products as well. The release of the Ion had more than doubled the size of Smart Parts itself, in both manufacturing space and workforce. A few years after having been released, the wake of the Ion's blow to the paintball industry actually hit Smart Parts themselves, which contributed to the temporary increase in MSRP. This particular year in the paintball industry (2005) saw the most closed stores, fields, and manufacturers than all previous years combined. The release of the Ion being coincidentally in 2005 surely couldn't have helped, however factual evidence either way is circumstantial.

Other paintball companies have matched this low-cost, low markup marketing concept (examples being the Proto Rail (based on the Proto Matrix), ICD Promaster, Eclipse Etek Ego (based on the Planet Eclipse Ego), and others). However, these competing products are notably less popular in comparison, likely due to their higher price tags, although still remaining very economic alternatives to their respective "high-performance" counterparts. The popularity of the Ion also allots it a massive amount of upgrades and specialized products, and like the older Impulse literally every part of the marker can be replaced with an aftermarket version.

In 2007 Smart Parts released an updated version of the ion called the ION XE, that includes built in B.O.B (bolt out back) function, which allows easier removal of the bolt. This makes maintenance considerably easier, as one must only take out a single screw as opposed to taking apart the entire marker. This was one of the major criticisms of the original Ions. The new Ion XE also consists of a new and improved low profile feedneck and a new body design. Ion XE colored bodies are available.

==== SP-8 ====
The SP-8 was released after the Ion. Mechanically, the two markers are almost identical, the major differences being that the SP-8 has a 45 degree feed tube instead of a vertical one, the regulator is mounted 15 degrees forward instead of vertical, the pressure gauge is on the right side instead of the left, and the triggers are different. The most noticeable difference is that the SP-8 has a milsim body, designed to mimic the appearance of a Heckler & Koch XM8 assault rifle, and is designed to easily allow the addition of a stock, as well as military accessories such as bipods, tactical flashlights, or red dot sights using weaver rails. This product was designed to bring the performance of an electronic marker to scenario players who sought paintball marker with a more realistic look and feel.

==== SP1 ====
Smart Parts SP1

The SP1 is a woodsball/scenario marker, being released in the same lineup as the Vibe, EOS, and Ion XE. It is the Vibe's woodsball counterpart (it has 7 mounting rails on its body for flashlights, laser sights and scopes), in the same way that the SP8 is the Ion's counterpart. It is also limited to 11 BPS. It uses the same internals as the Vibe, but has two different shells to protect them (an internal shell and an external "cosmetic" shell). Smart Parts claims that this marker has many possible upgrades, although most of these are limited to the guns mounting rails thus far. As with the Vibe, players whom own this marker are finding ways to shut off the Maximum Rate Of Fire limiter. With Smart Parts releasing the Blackheart in Q1 2008, the rate of fire is raised to 20 BPS. Along with that it adds anti-chop eyes.

==== Epiphany/EOS ====
The epiphany marker represents an upgraded version of the Ion. The Epiphany is a more stylized, upgraded Ion which comes with several factory enhancements out of the box, saving the user from buying the more inexpensive Ion and having to buy separate upgraded components for it over time. Besides for the obvious cosmetic difference, Epiphanies feature a metal exoskeleton and frame (with plating, to avoid threading problems), upgraded Firebolt, Freak barrel starter, integrated ASA dovetail, Q-Lock Feed Neck (Eos only), and Smartvalve ASA among other things. Internally the Epiphany also gives the user the ability to alter the marker's internal firing air volume. This is carried out by select from three different internal air volume "inserts" which are used to take up slack space in the marker's fire chamber. The smaller air space in the fire chamber can refill faster, which allows the Epiphany to fire faster without velocity drop-off when compared to the Ion and SP-8. The fire chamber inserts allow fine-tuning and adjustment that wouldn't be previously available without developing a homemade modification. The Epiphany fire chamber, inserts and valve spring are available as performance upgrades for the Ion and SP-8. Epiphanies are available in multiple colors and cost around $300.

==== Vibe ====
Vibe is the latest marker in Smart Part's low cost lineup, as it was released at the same time as the SP1, the EOS, and the Ion XE. It is an electropneumatic marker operating at approximately 180 PSI, similar to that of the Ion. It is also extremely inexpensive for an electropneumatic marker and can be bought for $140. It does not include eyes, instead having a low force bolt. With the low force bolt, chopping is nearly eliminated. The newer Vibe has four firing modes: tournament lock semi-auto, semi-auto, three-shot burst, and fully automatic. The first batch of Vibes did not include these modes; because they were upgraded so soon after the release, Smart Parts would upgrade consumers' non-select fire board free of charge.

The marker weight is only 1 lb. 11 oz. The length (w/out barrel) is 8.75 in. The vibe is made of fiberglass reinforced nylon grip (frame/body) and accepts Impulse threaded barrels.

=== Barrels (All American, Teardrop, Flute; Freak & Freak JR.) ===
Smart Parts has sold their two-piece All American barrel system since 1989. This was changed in 2001 to the current version which uses a standardized thread compatible with Freak barrel backs (below). The cosmetic milling was changed on the AA barrel in 2006 (along with most other barrels from SP).

SP has sold or is currently selling several one-piece barrels, including the Progressive (stock on Impulses), Teardrop (Progressive barrel with upgraded porting), Linear barrel, and the Tactical 21" barrel (used mainly on SP8 markers).

Smart Parts' major barrel product is the Freak barrel system. This is an "insert" barrel kit, where the user selects one of a number of different-sized bore inserts to use (eight different sizes and a barrel back and barrel tip come with the full Freak kit). There are a total of nine inserts in normal sizes and a 10th one (reball sized). The aluminum boremaster set is .679, .682, .684, .687, .689, .691, .693, and .695, and the stainless boremaster set is .682, .684, .687, .689, .691, .693, .695, and .697. The insert is then installed in the back of the barrel (a two-piece barrel plus the insert, making three pieces total). The alternative to this is a "multi-bore" kit that consists of varied barrel backs for a two-piece barrel. The advantages to using an insert instead of a multi-back kit is greatly reduced price and versatility of use on more than one type of marker. The disadvantage is that inserts are more fragile (aluminium more so than the stainless) than a typical barrel back, so care must be taken. Freak barrels are available in aluminium and steel versions, compatible with both Freak and All American style fronts (varying color, length. Freak barrel backs and All American backs are compatible with the "Stiff tip" (carbon fiber tip made by STIFFI/Site Mfg.). The insert sets are compatible with white wolf airsmithing's "justice barrels" aka phantoms "Frantom", and Deadly Winds "Fiber barrel" . Freak styling was changed in 2006 along with the other SP barrels.

=== Apparel ===
In addition to equipment, Smart Parts manufactured different types of apparel, such as jerseys, pants, pod packs, barrel socks/plugs, and casual wear. Smart Parts developed customized jerseys for their sponsored teams and could also be contracted to making a team number of jerseys for private use.

=== Air systems ===
Smart Parts has continuously strived to market non-screw in type tank systems for use with their markers. These types of air systems are mounted directly to the marker and don't use a standard "screw-in" type ASA adapter. The first version of this air system was the Max-Flo manifold in 1999, which continued until mid/late 2003. This regulator system used a large regulator and attached manifold section to operate. This was redesigned into the Max-Flo Inline in 2003, which continued until early 2006. The Max-Flo Inline was similar to the previous versions except drastically reduced in size and appearance. In 2006 SP released the Max-Flo Micro, which was their first non-adjustable tank system. The Micro version is the smallest air system to date from SP.

Smart Parts also produced an in-line ASA on/off valve (called the Smartvalve) which gives standard screw-in tanks the ability to use an on/off shutoff valve. The Smartvalve system does not include a bleed feature. The Smartvalve was also available in a CO_{2} tank version, giving the CO_{2} tank integrated shutoff capability as well.
