= Bravo Sports =

American sporting goods company

- Company type: Privately held company
- Industry: Sporting goods
- Founded: 1997; 29 years ago
- Founder: Leonardo Pais
- Headquarters: Santa Fe Springs, California, United States
- Area served: United States
- Products: Skateboards, scooters, roller skates, and protective wear
- Number of employees: 91 (2024)
- Website: bravosportscorp.com

Bravo Sports is an American sporting-goods company based in Santa Fe Springs, California. The company manufactures, skateboards, scooters, roller skates, and parts as well as related protective wear under brand names such as Pulse Performance, Satellite, Maple, and Kryptonics.

It also sells lawn canopies under the brand names One Industries, QuickShade, ShadeTech, MotoShade, EzUp, etc. The canopies are branded under licenses from Marvel, John Deere, Disney, etc.

== History ==
The company was founded in 1997 by the CEO Leonardo Pais who merged his own company, Xero Wheels Sri (of Italy) with Kryptonics.

By 2016, the company had an annual revenue of $10M - $20M US Dollars, with 51-200 employees.

== Advertiser ==
One Industries MTV sport 1997 AND1 from Blitzkrieg 2001 before first pumptrack.
