= CCI Phantom =

Pump action paintball marker

Specifications
- Type: Mechanical
- Action: Pump Action
- Barrel: 6–14 inches
- Bore: .686
- Rate of fire: Limited

The CCI Phantom is a Nelson-based pump action paintball marker developed and produced by Mike Casady. Production began in 1987 after about six months of prototype work. The name for the marker was derived from the much more stealth-oriented and drawn-out style of play that was typical when the game was first developing. The Phantom was designed to be powered by a single 12-gram CO_{2} Powerlet, but larger tanks may also be used by removing the powerlet adapter or using a dummy powerlet. When first introduced the marker featured a fixed barrel assembly referred to as a "unibody" combined with a modified Crosman air pistol frame and brass bead sight. However, since roughly 1989 the body and barrel of the marker have been two distinct parts and no longer feature the bead style sight. The marker is also capable of supporting bulk gravity fed hoppers by using a different breach type. The Phantom is one of only a handful of readily available markers acceptable for use in the various forms of stock class paintball. However, because the Phantom is capable of auto-triggering and features barrel porting it is considered to be a modified stock class marker.

Component Concepts, Inc. (CCI) is located in Newberg, Oregon and was founded in 1979 to provide product design assistance and manufacturing expertise in dental equipment.

== Operation ==
Full animation of the Phantom's firing cycle.

Compressed gas enters the valve of the Phantom, pressing the cup seal assembly against the retainer with the aide of the valve spring. This gas forces the valve to stay sealed and allows the gun to be cocked which prepares the hammer of the paintball marker for firing. Without the pressure of the gas in the valve the gun cannot be cocked. As indicated by the term pump action the first step in firing the marker is the pump stroke which uses the rod connecting the pump handle and bolt to cock the marker. The pump stroke consists of two parts; the backward pump stroke and the forward pump stroke. On the backward pump stroke the bolt moves back, compressing the main spring until the bolt and hammer are connected by the sear. At this time a single ball drops into the breech. Next, during the forward pump stroke, both the bolt and hammer move forward, chambering the paintball sealing the breech. Next, as the trigger is pulled, the sear pivots and releases the hammer from the bolt. The compressed main spring forces the hammer back until it reaches the rear of the power tube and provides enough energy to force the power tube back. As the power tube is pushed back the valve opens and compressed gas flows through the power tube and the tuned port compensator (TPC), projecting the paintball out of the barrel.

== Design ==
The original unibody Phantom featuring the modified Crosman grip frame, stick feed, dropout changer, and brass bead sight.

The term Nelson-based lends itself to the Nelson Paint Company and its first marker, the Nel-Spot 007. The basic valve design found in these early markers laid the groundwork for many other manufacturers to develop their own paintball guns. The Nelson design is in-line which means that the bolt, hammer, and valve follow the barrel and form a line as opposed to being stacked. It fires from a closed bolt position meaning that when it fires the bolt is secured into the breech end of the barrel with a paintball loaded. In comparison, the bolt in an open bolt marker is not secured until the marker fires, at which point the paintball is chambered, fired, and the bolt is then re-opened. Another characteristic of the Phantom that varies within the Nelson-based family of markers is that it features the original breech drop design as opposed to the bore drop variation of the design, meaning that the paintballs drop into breech, or rear of the barrel, rather than dropping into the bore of the barrel.

Top: a stock class dropout Phantom with 45 style grip. Bottom: a gravity feed Phantom with M16 style grip.

=== Variants ===
Different breech layouts allow players to use larger hoppers that are more common among contemporary semi-automatic markers or horizontal feed tubes. There are two styles available for the Phantom; gravity feed and stock class. Another feature which may differ depending on user preference is the grip frame. The two most common grip frames available for the CCI Phantom paintball marker are the .45 style and M16 style. The .45 is an offshoot of the common grip structure for handguns chambered for the .45 ACP pistol cartridge such as the M1911 Colt pistol. However, the .45 grip frame is a purely visual replica of its firearm relative as the Phantom cannot be fed by a magazine. The standard grip on the .45 grip frame is the government model rubber grip with finger grooves produced by Hogue Inc. The M16-style grip frame is derived from the structure of the rifle of the same name, the M16 rifle. The M16-style grip used in the Phantom is produced by Ram-Line and is made of plastic. Players can also opt to use either 12 gram CO_{2} powerlets or a tank filled with CO_{2} or compressed air.

== The first Phantom Revolution ==
An early advertisement of the Phantom Revolution.

The original Phantom Revolution was an unfinished semi-automatic paintball marker developed during the early 1990s. It featured an electrically powered rotary breech which was activated by an on-board computer system and microphone which responded to the sound of the marker being fired. Another notable innovation in the Revolution was its boltless design. The breech, which rotated on an axis in a similar fashion to that of the cylinder of a revolver, allowed a paintball to be fed into the breech which would then align with the firing chamber, creating a seal. The maximum rate of fire was 7 balls per second, or 14 with a two-hole breech. A few working prototypes were demonstrated at the 1996 National Professional Paintball League World Cup in Orlando, Florida by Mike Casady. However, production was halted indefinitely in 1996 due to a technical problem with the motor pinion drive. Additionally, there were several markers being produced or developed at the time which used a switch for a trigger and a circuit board to control the feed and/or the pneumatic firing sequence such as the Smart Parts Shocker. The sport of paintball saw explosive growth during this decade and as the industry became more lucrative, many patent disputes and lawsuits occurred. CCI effectively sidestepped them by focusing solely on the pump paintball market. All together enough parts for 50 prototypes were fabricated, 12 were assembled, and all but two have been accounted for by Casady.

== The production Phantom Revolution ==
Around 2012, a pump-action marker was released under the Phantom Revolution moniker. It differs significantly from the 1996 prototypes, and is essentially a MQ-valved inline with an independent bolt.
