= Ariakon Overlord =

The Ariakon Overlord is a semi-automatic .68 caliber paintball pistol.

The Overlord has what is claimed to be the fastest available loading system for a paintball pistol, the Rapid Release Magazine System. A lever at the back of the system releases the magazine, which is ejected with the help of a spring.

The pistol's power supply is a 12 gram CO_{2} powerlet. Brass Eagle 12-gram cartridges are known to work with these markers. Other cartridges may be difficult to eject, and some have been known to puncture the O-ring seal and create leaks.

Ariakon came out with an upgraded model, the Overlord RX, in early 2007 featuring cheaper, lighter magazines, a threaded barrel, and cutouts in the side of the CO_{2} chamber to reduce problems with the CO_{2} cartridges jamming.

Ariakon overlords are capable of shooting between 240 and 350 ft/s (73 and 107 m/s), reaching ranges of up to 150 feet (46 m) and are also capable of a bottom line feed if one does not wish to use 12 gram CO_{2} cartridges.

== See also ==
- Paintball
- Paintball marker
- Scenario paintball
