= Kryptonics (company) =

American sporting goods manufacturer

Kryptonics Skateboards is an American manufacturer of Skateboards and Longboards founded in 1965 and originally manufactured polyurethane products for the mining and computer industry.

In the mid-1970s, the company introduced the Kryptonics Star Trac line of wheels that drastically changed the functionality of skateboards. It was the first company to offer wheels in color coded durometers, and to use millimeter sizing. Kryptonics soon became the dominant wheel for all types of skateboarding, excelling on all types of terrain and winning more races than any other wheel brand.

Skateboarders such as Stacy Peralta, Tony Alva, Steve Alba, Micke Alba, David Hackett, Bobby Piercy, Tommy Ryan, and many others were or are sponsored by Kryptonics.
