= RAP4 =

Rap4 - Real Action Paintball
- Founded: Santa Clara, California (2002)
- Headquarters: Santa Clara, California
- Website: www.rap4.com

RAP4 is a manufacturer of paintball markers, paintball equipment, tactical gear and training tools, founded in 2002.

The company's T68 paintball marker debuted with the first generation in 2004, and has since had seven revisions. It is a .68-caliber semi-automatic and full auto CO_{2} or HPA (high pressure air) powered paintball marker. Besides standard paintball play, the marker is also used for military simulation (MilSim), and law enforcement training. as the marker physically resembles an M16 and M4 U.S. Military assault rifle and carbines.

== Notes ==
- https://web.archive.org/web/20090924004819/http://www.pbreview.com/products/reviews/3130/
- https://web.archive.org/web/20090830061736/http://www.rap4.com/paintball/os/
