= Automag (paintball marker) =

Guntype

The Automag is a paintball marker designed by Tom Kaye and produced by Airgun Designs, Inc. It bears the distinction of being the first semi-automatic marker ever to win a paintball tournament. Team Swarm used Automags in their victory at the 1990 International Masters.

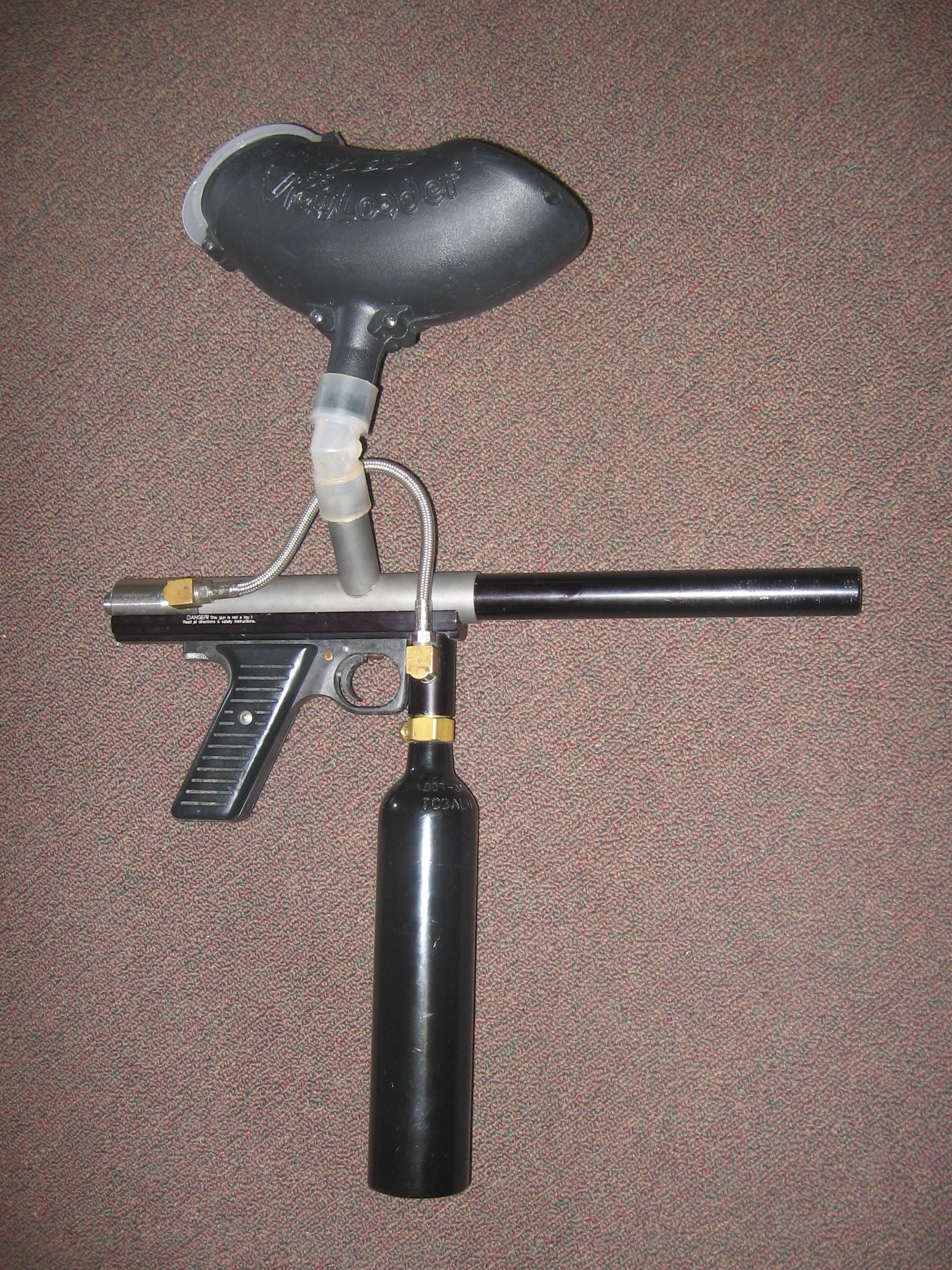
An Automag Classic with attached Brass Eagle 9 oz. CO_{2} tank and ViewLoader hopper

== History ==
The first Automag was invented in 1985, but was revised several times before its release in 1990. As one of the first generation of semi-automatic paintball markers, its blow forward design was unique. Made mostly from stainless steel, the valve system was the first to incorporate a pressure regulator directly into the marker. The design also allowed for disassembly in the field without tools. The marker also introduced other innovations including a quick release twist lock barrel and the Power Feed, which was an angled feed system that prevented balls from being blown back up into the hopper.

The Panther was the first prototype semi-automatic marker designed by Tom Kaye of Airgun Designs in 1988. Since it was only a prototype it was never offered to the public. The design was sold to Direct Connect, but was never manufactured. AGD bought the design rights back in 1989 through a non-performance clause in the original contract. The blow back design was deemed to be too primitive (because pump markers changed in 1988, they got removable barrels and quickstrip pins) so a second generation prototype "P2" (for Panther Prototype Two) was developed. This second design was also a blow back, and had many problems. It was decided to give up on blow back technology and re-engineer the entire action into a "blow-forward" design. This eliminated many problems inherent in blow-backs, such as their dependence on full, constant operating pressure in order to cycle reliably. This heralded the beginning of the Automag design which went through two revisions; P3 and P4. The P4 design was released to the public in 1990.

The Automag had several problems when first introduced and the company fixed them through free updates called Level 6 through Level 7. This inspired a loyal customer base and the marker rose to become the most popular tournament marker in the mid-nineties. The Minimag and the Sydarm were introduced as variants, with the Sydarm targeted specifically at police training. Later came the RT which incorporated an all new regulator that made shootdown impossible (it could recharge 25 times per second), and had "reactive trigger" technology; after the marker fired, input pressure manipulated the mechanical link to force the trigger to return to its resting position, which reduced problems with "short-stroking". The Level 10 bolt was designed to eliminate ball-chop during high rates of fire. AGD now sells the X-valve, which is the RT Pro valve made from aluminum instead of stainless steel, and is combined with the Level 10 bolt.

Airgun Designs briefly produced the E-mag and the X-Mag, manufactured by Airgun Designs Europe, to compete in tournaments that have come to be dominated by electro-pneumatic models. They have since discontinued their production. The E-Mag's design is unique in that it retains a mechanical link between the trigger and firing mechanism; the electronics work with manipulate electromagnets that lessen the pull strength. With a dead battery, the magnets are simply not functional and the gun reverts to mechanical operation similar to an RT. Therefore, the E-mag remained the only electro-pneumatic marker that would fire with a dead battery until the production of the Tippmann X-7 Phenom with its E-grip in 2009.

The "Reactive Trigger" of the RT and subsequent E-Mag and X-Mag designs proved to be detrimental to AGD; it was found that, given an HPA tank with sufficient output pressure, the reactive trigger could be set to push back after firing with greater strength than was required to pull it, allowing simulated full-auto operation by finding a "sweet spot" on the trigger, squeezing it with just enough force to fire it but less than the return strength. This was determined by the NPPL and other tournament leagues to confer an unfair advantage, and the rules were changed to specifically prohibit triggers set up to "bounce" (defined as registering more than one mechanical "pull" of the trigger per conscious application of pressure to the trigger by the player, whether by mechanical or electronic means).

The paintball market has since evolved into fully electronic markers, which provide higher rates of fire and lighter trigger pulls, many at lower cost than the all-mechanical Automag. The Automag has a reputation as a reliable mechanical marker. Airgun Designs remains in business despite having largely exited the tournament market. It is known for its tech support, and the Automag has a following of customers who customize and maintain their markers. Mechanical Automags have had a resurgence in popularity with woodsball and scenario players due to their reliability, compact design, and water resistant qualities.

=== Company ===
Airgun Designs, Inc. (AGD) is a manufacturer of paintball markers and equipment formerly based in Wheeling, IL. The company is now based in Cary, IL. Tom Kaye founded AGD in 1987. As one of the oldest paintball companies in existence, AGD has been responsible for several innovations now common on the paintball scene.

==== Other AGD innovations ====
===== Warp Feed =====
AGD's Warp Feed is a force feed system used to feed paintballs into a marker. It is fed by a hopper set on the top of the actual warp feed system. The main purpose is to give a player a lower profile, while maintaining extremely high feed rates. This was the first commercially produced under-the-barrel force feed system on the market. The warp feed isn't really a loader but rather a ball accelerator. Paintballs are fed from a loader, and when the Warp Feed senses the vibration from the marker firing, the Warp Feed begins turning disks inside, and accelerates the paintballs into the elbow of the paintball marker.

===== Ultra Light Trigger (ULT) =====
The Ultra Light Trigger was designed by Tom Kaye in order to evolve the Automag. It reduced the trigger pull from nearly 6 lbf (27 N) to a mere 16 ozf (4.4 N) trigger pull. This allowed mechanical markers to have the light feel of an electronic marker giving players an alternative. This innovation of the ULT also allowed players to pull the trigger at a higher rate than what they could before. Realistically players can reach speeds of 1-14 balls per second depending on how fast they can pull the trigger.

===== Level Ten Bolt =====
The Level Ten, or Level X bolt is AGD's answer to the ball breakage issues. This drop-in upgrade eliminates the need for the powerfeed design on older body styles and was ushered in with the Ultra Light Engineered vertical feed body. Most modern electronic markers rely on electronic "eyes" to prevent chops, consisting of either an Infra-red sensor or an LED/Light Sensor combination. When a paintball enters the breech, the eyes complete the firing circuit and allow the firing cycle to continue. The Level X upgrade, however, does not rely on electronics, and is thus not susceptible to problems associated with dirty or uncalibrated eyes.

===== Ultra Light Engineering =====
One of the products of the Ultra Light Engineering (ULE) from Tom Kaye was the aluminum vertical feed bodies. These ULE vertical bodies gave players a tighter profile when playing paintball. These bodies use Autococker threaded barrels and Angel threaded feednecks and ball-detents. This made the powerfeed tube design obsolete since chopping was no longer a problem with the help of the level ten bolt and agitated/force feed loaders. The use of aluminum instead of stainless steel dropped the weight of the automag significantly, allowing players a tighter as well as lighter marker setup.

===== Six Pack + =====
One of the original products designed and introduced by AGD, the 6Pak+ was a lever and cam operated 12-gram changer capable of holding six 12-gram gas cartridges in a spring-operated magazine and another in the gun adapter (seven cartridges total and the reason for the '+' in the name). Offered as an effective alternative to pump gun players who were unwilling, or prevented by tournament rules, to make the switch to 'constant air' (large capacity air tanks).

== Operation ==
The Automag uses a blow-forward operation. The idea behind it is to use a constant volume of air at constant pressure each shot, as to exert a constant amount of force each shot, resulting in great consistency. It is also relatively simple:

1. The trigger is pulled, the sear closes the on/off valve and releases the bolt a split second later.
2. Compressed air in the dump chamber overcomes the force of the bolt spring, pushing the bolt forward. As the bolt travels forward it seals off the feed port and 'uncorks' from the dump chamber. The compressed air from the dump chamber passes through the bolt and propels a paintball down the barrel.
3. Once the dump chamber pressure is vented down the barrel, the bolt is returned by a spring.
4. The trigger is released
5. The on/off valve opens and repressurizes the dump chamber
6. The dump chamber pushes the bolt forward, which is now held in place by the sear.
7. The marker is ready to fire again

The design was the original blow forward paintball marker. The design is also used in many other markers. Currently available new markers that use the blow forward system are the Tiberius Arms line of markers, and the ICD Freestyles. The spool valve family of electropneumatic markers is also derived from this blow-forward operation.

== Classic ==
Through the many years of its production there have been a few variants of the Automag, such as the "TKO Automag" or the Minimag. The TKO Automag was no different than any other Automag, except it came preconfigured with some non-stock accessories, such as a barrel, vertical ASA, and bottomline adapter. The body rail is a black anodized aluminum extrusion and the grip frame manufactured of a carbon composite.

=== .68 Classic ===
Original Automag. Stainless steel body and back, with offset powerfeed. Shipped with Level 1-7 valves.

=== Sydarm ===
The Sydarm, pronounced "sidearm", is pistol variant of the Automag Classic, developed for Law Enforcement use. It is powered by 12 gram CO2 cartridges instead of constant air tanks. It uses a stacked tubed design with the top tube housing 8 paintballs loaded at the front and the CO2 cartridge loaded at the rear. It uses AGD's twist lock barrels and can usually fire 25-30 paintballs per CO2 cartridge.

=== Minimag ===
The Minimag functionally is the same as an Automag Classic. Cosmetically, it has a longer stainless steel powerfeed body with venting milled into the front end. In addition, the stock barrel was a bit shorter, and a vertical ASA with a braided stainless steel line from the ASA to the A.I.R. (Advanced Integrated Regulator) valve.

=== Micro Mag ===
The company Pro-Team Products (PTP) paired the Automag internals with a custom built body that was smaller and lighter. They often came in many anodized designs as the bodies were made out of aluminum. They used Autococker barrel threads instead of AGD's twist lock style. The original Micromag body design featured a two inch integrated barrel, but not many were produced and are considered very rare.

=== RT-Based Automags ===
==== The Automag RT ====
In 1996, Airgun Designs released the Automag RT (RT standing for Reactive Trigger). This revolutionary design required high pressure air (HPA) to operate; the rapid decompression involved in the valve would quickly cause CO_{2} to liquefy and freeze the valve's components, thus making the more expensive gas a necessity. This valve uses air pressure to quickly reset the trigger after a shot, thus enabling a faster rate of fire. Shootdown became impossible, as these valves recharged faster than anyone could pull the trigger; in fact, due to their design, they heated up under rapid fire and actually experienced shootup instead. Unfortunately, the original design was fed its gas through the marker's rail, and thus was incompatible as an upgrade to older Automags. This did not fit Airgun Designs' vision of customer support, and it was soon superseded by another design.

==== The ReTro Valve ====
The ReTro Valve was a new version of the RT valve, designed to be compatible with older Automags. While initially sold as an upgrade, it soon became the standard for all new high-end Automags, and was used as the basis for the MicroMag, a collaborative project with PTP (Pro Team Products). It was also used as the initial valve for the E-Mag. This valve, unlike the classic valve, was made out of stainless steel with an aluminum back. It was capable of an estimated 26 BPS fire before shootdown.

==== The X-Valve and the advent of UltraLight Engineering (ULE) ====
The advent of 700 billet aluminum meant that components no longer had to be made of stainless steel in order to be both strong and light. This aluminum, while more expensive, allowed for a significant weight savings in most components of the marker. The X-Valve is functionally identical to the ReTro Valve, but is made of aluminum instead of stainless steel. This results in an approximately 50% weight savings for no loss in durability or performance. The same concept was applied to the mainbodies, and the result was UltraLight Engineering (ULE). In addition to the weight savings, aluminum could be anodized instead of painted, allowing for more impressive colors and designs. The result is a much lighter marker than any in the previous generations; indeed, Automags are some of the lightest markers available today. The lighter components also yielded some minor performance increases; the X-Valve has been unofficially tested to perform in excess of 30 BPS with no shootdown.

=== E-Mag ===
The E-Mag is an electronic Automag. Like other Automags, it has gone through different versions corresponding to advances to the Automag platform like the ReTro Valve, the Level 10 anti-chop system and the X-valve. Unlike most electronic markers, the E-mag is capable of firing in both electronic and mechanical modes through means of a readily available selector switch. The battery is rated for approximately 10 cases of paint (20,000 shots), This is in stark contrast to other electronic markers of the time(2000-2004) that must be recharged frequently or risk going down in the middle of a game, the trade off is that the E-Mag uses a much larger battery pack, whereas most markers operated off of a normal 9v battery. The E-Mag uses an unusual Hall-effect sensor trigger instead of the more common microswitch, and the sensitivity of this magnetic trigger system gives the E-Mag a reputation for having hair trigger. Indeed, there have been many instances where the marker has fired from a slight jar instead of an intentional trigger pull. As a result, the safety is a very reliable actuator interrupt, and the marker is physically incapable of firing with it engaged.

=== X-Mag ===
The X-Mag was basically the same marker as the E-Mag electronically, except it also included the ACE (Anti-Chop Eye). The components included the original introduction of the X-Valve, originally engraved with an XMag symbol, and now just an X. It wasn't always called the X-Mag. It originally was called the Emag Extreem which later became X-Mag for short. The body of the X-Mag was a single piece instead of the body-rail combo that all previous AGD mags used. The main feature of the X-Mag, besides the one-piece body, was the removable breeches, which allowed users to change the feed port from center feed to warpfeed left or warpfeed right. There were some rare colors produced just as in every previous run. Magma and Placenta were two of the colors that had runs of 3 or less. The original X-Mag was considered somewhat "blocky-looking," so AGD ran the body through a computer controlled CNC milling machine. The result was a lighter, more attractive marker named the C&C X-Mag.

=== FN303 ===
The original Automag design has evolved into other products and is the heart of the FN303 Less Lethal Weapon System developed for Police and Military use.
