= DYE Precision =

Manufacturer of paintball equipment

DYE Precision, Inc.
- Company type: Manufacturing
- Industry: Sports
- Founded: 1994
- Founder: Dave Dehaan
- Headquarters: San Diego, California, United States
- Products: Paintball gear, Airsoft Masks, Tactical Clothing, Casual Wear
- Number of employees: 250 (2012)
- Divisions: Proto Paintball, DYE CNC
- Website: www.dyepaintball.com

DYE Precision, also known as simply DYE, is a paintball equipment manufacturing company and a well known Numerical control (CNC) manufacturing company operated under the brand DYE CNC based in California. Dave Dehaan started the company by producing barrels for paintball markers, using his garage as a workshop. He supplied barrels to the California Ironmen and Team Avalanche, who at that time were two of the most dominant teams in Professional paintball. DYE went on to manufacture an extensive range of paintball markers, loaders, playing & casual clothing, protective gear, goggles and luggage and created an economy focused offshoot brand Proto Paintball. Their range of products is typically updated each year. In 2005, the company was praised as one of the industry's largest paintball manufacturers. The company has offices in London, Taiwan and Germany.

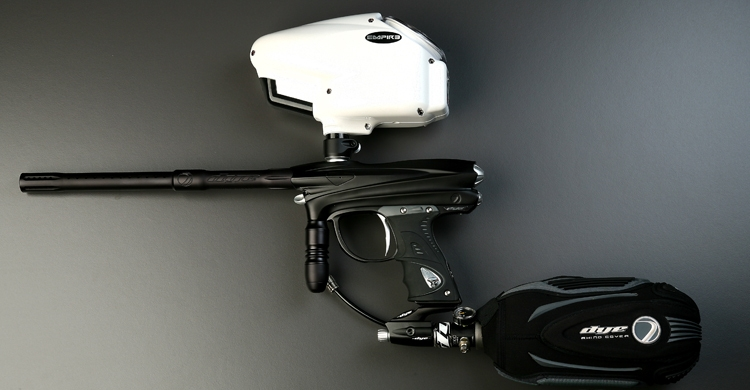
A 2006 Dye Matrix

== Markers ==
DYE markers are considered to be high end tournament level markers and have been used professionally since their inception. Their most notable marker the Matrix line is a spool valve operated electropneumatic marker that featured smooth "flowing" milling to the aluminum body and a soft shot profile. In the year 2006, Dye Precision moves marker production to Taiwan so that the savings can be passed on to the players. Quality of machine work declined after the DM6 with larger variances of clearances between parts. Evidence Many notable professional teams have used DYE markers including Los Angeles Ironmen, Tampa Bay Damage and Red Legion.

DYE Markers
Model Name	Release date	MSRP ($USD)	Special Releases
Reflex Autococker	2002	N/A	
Ultralite Autococker	2002	N/A	
Matrix LCD	2003	$949.99	
Matrix LED	2003	$799.99	
DM4	2004	$1449.99	Dark
DM5	2005	$1349.99	Shocktech
DM6	2006	$1299.99	Ironmen; Ollie Lang
DM7	2007	$1399.99	
DM8	2008	$1299.99	
DM9	2009	$1349.99	
DM10	2010	$1299.99	
DM11	2011	$1299.95	
DM12	2012	$1099.99	
DYE NT	2013	$999.99	
DM14	2014	$1299.95	
DM15	2015	$1000.95	
DYE m2	2015	$1395.95	
RIZE	2016	N/A	
DYE m2 MOSAir	2016	N/A	
DYE DSR	2017	$899.95	
DYE m3s	2018	$1599.95	
DYE m3+	2018	$1599.95	
DYE RIZE CZR	2019	$300	
DYE DSR+	2021	$999.95	
DYE DLS Icon Series	2022	$1695.00	Limited Edition, 500 Units made Worldwide
DYE M3+ Icon Series	2023	$1595.00 to $1695.00	Limited Edition, 220 Units made Worldwide
DYE MXR	2024	$1499.95 to $1649.95	
DYE DSR Pro	2025	$1199.95 to $1299.95	

== History ==
DYE Precision was founded by Dave and Rhonda DeHaan in 1994. DYE stands for Dave "Youngblood" Enterprises.

In 2006, DYE Precision sponsored a team, XXTIONEER, at the 2006 Paintball World Cup Asia.

In March 2009, DYE Precision manufactured the Baltimore Trauma with 2009 Mid-Atlantic Open jerseys.

In March 2010, the company allowed teams at the 2010 Paintball Sports Promotions World Cup to experience the new 2010 models free of charge. In April 2010, DYE Precision manufactured the jerseys for professional paintball team Portland Naughty Dogs. and later presented them with a limited special edition Naughty Dogs NT paintball gun. That same month, DYE Precision co-hosted the National Collegiate Paintball Association tournament in Central Florida.

In January 2011, DYE Precision signed a multi-year agreement with professional paintball team Chattanooga CEP.

In October 2012, DYE Precision signed a multi-year agreement with Ukrainian professional paintball team Hulk Kiev

In November 2012, the company purchased Pro-Tec, a helmet manufacturing company, from apparel and sports equipment company Vans for an undisclosed amount.

In December 2015, DYE Precision sold off Pro-Tec, a helmet manufacturing company, to Bravo Sports, a sporting goods and manufacturing brand for an undisclosed amount.
