= Tippmann =

American paintball supply manufacturer

Tippmann Sports LLC
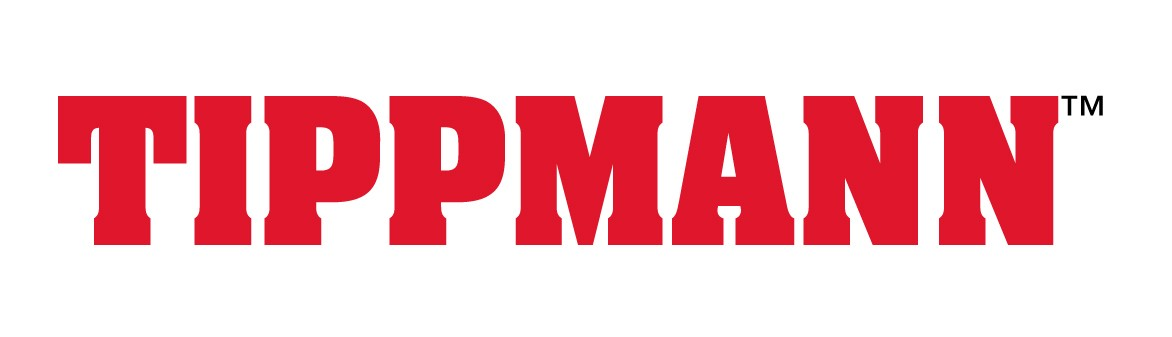
- Type: LLC
- Industry: Paintball; Pneumatic Sewing Machines; Industrial
- Founded: Fort Wayne, Indiana (Early 1980s)
- Headquarters: Fort Wayne, Indiana, United States
- Key people: Dennis Tippmann Jr.
- Products: Alpha Black/Bravo One; Model 98; 98 Custom; Custom Pro; A-5; C-3; X-7 and X7 Phenom; Triumph Series; Flatline Barrel System; Response Trigger System; Tippmann TPX; Tippmann Gatling
- Revenue: N/A USD (2005)
- Operating income: N/A USD (2005)
- Net income: N/A USD (2005)
- Number of employees: 120 (2005)
- Website: www.tippmann.com

Tippmann is an American manufacturer of guns and guns, including military simulation (MilSim) kits. Tippmann Industrial Products, a related company manufactures manual and pneumatic heavy-duty sewing machines primarily used for leather, other leather-related equipment, and some industrial products. Originally a family-owned business run from Fort Wayne, Indiana, in 2004 Dennis Tippmann Sr. sold a majority ownership stake to Summit Partners, a private equity firm. Tippmann designed one of the first automatic markers, the use of refillable air systems in place of 12 gram cartridges, the "Cyclone Feed" system, the "Flatline" barrel, and the Tippmann C-3, the first propane-powered marker.

== History ==
The Tippmann family, headed by Dennis Tippmann Senior, originally manufactured collectible, half-scale replica machine guns. However, a change in gun laws led to entry into the paintball market in 1986; forming the Tippmann Pneumatics Incorporated company. The company attempted to make high-performance, durable and affordable products - with the company claiming to have built the first semi-automatic and full-automatic paintball markers in the world.

In June 2004, Tippmann announced that the company had completed a financial recapitalization with private equity and venture capital firm Summit Partners. Howard Kosick joined Tippmann as its president and CEO, with both Dennis Tippman Senior and Dennis Tippmann Junior remaining on the company’s Board of directors as consultants; the latter continuing with the management team in product development. Shortly afterward in 2005, the company announced a record year for increased sales of paint marker units.

The company has been credited with the development of several technologies, including the introduction of C3 with PEP Technology propane markers in 2005, and improved Anti-Chop technology in 2006 to combat paintball breakages inside the marker.

In 2010, Tippmann Sports acquired NXe, a manufacturer of soft goods for the paintball industry. The acquisition combined the industry’s leading paintball marker brand with the leading soft goods brand. A full line of paintball harnesses, protective gear, tank covers, apparel, bags, pods and other miscellaneous accessories were immediately integrated into Tippmann’s existing product offering.

On December 20, 2013, the acquisition of Tippmann was announced by G.I. Sportz Chairman and CEO Richmond Italia.

In 2020, G.I. Sportz and Tippmann filed for creditor protection under the Companies' Creditors Arrangement Act in Canada and Chapter 15 bankruptcy in the United States after stating that they would be unable to pay $29 million under a credit agreement.

== Current paintball markers ==
=== Tippmann M4 Carbine (TMC) ===
The TMC is Tippmann's MagFed Paintball Marker. It was first sold to the public in 2016 it can be magazine or hopper fed. It comes in an all black or a black and tan finish. The TMC is approximately 4 lb (1.8 kg) in weight.

=== Tippmann Tactical Compact Rifle (TCR) ===
The TCR is Tippmann's MagFed only close-quarters battle military simulation magazine fed paintball marker. The manual was published in February 2015. The TCR is first strike round ready out of the box. It can be powered by 12 gram CO_{2} cartridges or by using a remote line to a larger tank. This paintball marker cannot use a hopper without being disassembled to install an adapter and must be reloaded via magazine. The TCR is about 4 lb 6 oz (2.0 kg) in weight.

=== Cronus ===
The Cronus was released by Tippmann in December 2013. It comes in a "Basic" version, which includes just the marker and simple barrel. It also comes in a "Tactical" version, with a more M16-like appearance. The Tactical version features a 6-position adjustable stock, barrel shroud, forward grip, and a removable carry handle, similar to that seen on the Alpha Black Elite. It comes in a desert tan or olive green finish.

=== Crossover ===
Debuting in 2012, the Crossover is aimed at both Speedball and Recreational play. The Crossover utilizes the latest version of the FlexValve, allowing it to fire in both Electronic and Mechanical modes. Other advancements and features include integrated break beam anti-chop eyes, low pressure operation under 300 PSI allowing users to use LPA tanks and a magnetic hall effect trigger. The upper body is a solid-machined piece of aluminum and has a centered adjusting feedback to allow the use of any hopper.

Being a "hybrid" marker, the Crossover board comes with pre-installed tournament modes for semi-pro and professional speedball play. The board features multiple adjustable firing modes, including standard semi-auto, auto-response, 3-shot burst, PSP, NPPL and Millennium modes. It also has a bottom regulator with the ability to convert to a front regulator so players can easily run their own regulator. As an added bonus of having a bottom regulator, the Crossover has the ability to utilize an internal gas line to keep the marker cleaner looking on the outside.

=== FT-12 ===
The FT-12 is one of Tippmann's newest paintball markers. Debuting in 2012, the FT-12 is aimed at rental and beginner use. The FT-12 uses a new body design never seen before in a Tippmann, using die-cast receivers. Splitting along the sides to open at the top, the FT-12 gives users a top-down view of the internals. The new body design can allow field owners to easily and quickly maintain their markers, with a savings of 75% in work time. The entire marker can be disassembled and reassembled in seconds, with everything coming right out the top. The FT-12 also utilizes an internal gas line, which prevents damage and leaks. The FT-12 also uses an enclosed bolt, similar to the A5, keeping dirt and debris from entering the marker through the cocking arm opening.

The FT-12 comes stock with a vertical foregrip that can be removed. The Ft-12 shares a thread similar to the 98 Custom "quick-thread" design, allowing the use of 98 Custom barrels. No other upgrades are available or compatible.

The FT-12 comes in 2 versions, a bright yellow framed rental version with rental labels riveted to the sides, and a black public version. Both generally sell for the same amount.

=== 98 Custom Platinum ===
The Tippmann 98 Custom has undergone many body and internal changes, but has remained almost the same over the years since being released in 1998. Tippmann's most recent 98 model, the 98 Custom Platinum, has many of Tippmann's most recent technology changes while keeping the 98 Custom a very reliable, basic and upgradeable marker. The 98 Custom utilizes the "clamshell" body design with a split receiver for even easier access to the internals. The powertube and valve were also redesigned with a self-sealing / locking gas line to allow easier removal. The marker is flat-topped, and unlike earlier 98 Customs, comes pre-grooved to allow the use of all picatinny accessories like sights, scopes and handles right out of the box. The marker features a new finish and a textured vertical foregrip with internal locking pins to provide extra stability. Other advancements include an integrated front sight spring and a solid rear sight, to make service easier. They also started making the stock endcap with a sling mount.

ACT (Anti-Chop Technology) is featured in current versions of the 98 Custom.

Tippmann also produces upgrades for the 98 Custom including the Response Trigger, eGrip and Cyclone feed system. The 98 Custom utilizes a "quick-thread" design that allows for quick and painless installation/ removal, and can take all 98 Custom threaded barrels and Flatline systems.

=== Gryphon ===
The Gryphon is essentially the same in-line blowback internals as the 98 custom, in a low cost speedball-esque style body. It has an internal gas line, fixed center-feed neck, a top cocking knob, and a 2 finger blade trigger. Sharing the same threads as the A5 and X7 Phenom, any A5/X7 barrel can be used. It was designed to give entry-level players on a budget an easy to maintain, effective and reliable marker for the lowest price possible. Its price is comparable to many of the "no-name" guns found in department stores, however the common parts and proven design make it far more reliable and repairable, allowing for years of use. The primary drawback of the marker is its limited upgrade options, although some internal upgrades MAY be interchangeable with the 98 Custom & US Army lineups.

=== A-5 ===
In appearance, the A-5 was modeled after the H&K MP5K but can be modified to look like a number of different real-world firearms. It is one of the most customizable markers on the market, with many different cosmetic and performance parts. The Tippmann A5 could easily accept standard ASA expansion chambers and regulators allowing easier performance upgrades, unlike the later X-7. Departing from previous Tippmann bodies, the A-5s hammer is completely enclosed within the clam-shell, using a separate overhead cocking mechanism. The body also incorporates a removable barrel thread adapter, allowing the marker to change its barrel threads to any major type (Spyder and Autococker being the most common).

The A-5 is a semi-automatic paintball marker. It utilizes an atypical pneumatic loader called the "Cyclone Feed" similar to the Tippmann F/As force feed. This enables the marker to have a higher rate of fire than a gravity feed without the addition of a battery-operated loader (at the cost of air efficiency). It uses a larger surface area and a series of rotating arms in a star-shaped pattern. Five balls are held between the paddles as they rotate paintballs into the firing chamber (moving 1/5 of a revolution per trigger pull). Theoretically, this system eliminates chops by positively feeding a paintball into the chamber before each shot.

The stock Cyclone is rated for a maximum of 15 balls per second. While higher rates of fire are possible, the stock mechanics are not designed to deal with the stresses this will place on them. This limitation was addressed during the creation of the X-7.

In addition to the stock semi-automatic function, the A-5 can be easily upgraded with either the Response Trigger or an Electronic Trigger by swapping out the lower grip frame, a feature introduced on the A-5.

=== X7 Phenom ===
The X7 Phenom is almost identical to the X7, with a few superficial differences, and an important internal difference. The X7 Phenom is 3 inches shorter than its X7 counterpart but still utilizes the same "clamshell" design. It also comes stock with a top Picatinny rail allowing the use of sights, scopes, and handles, and a hand-guard with top and bottom Picatinny rails. The X7 Phenom can use almost all X7 accessories and still uses the Cyclone feed system. X7 grips, however, cannot work on the X7 Phenom. The X7 supports full-auto firing with compatible E-grips.

Internally, the X7 Phenom is pioneered with Tippmann's new "Flex Valve" technology, allowing the marker to fire with under 300 PSI, making it more air/CO_{2} efficient. It also allows electro versions of the X7 Phenom to fire in mechanical semi-automatic mode when the battery for the electro-pneumatic operation has been depleted. The X7 Phenom also fires noticeably quieter and with less recoil than the X7.

=== TPX / TiPX ===
The Tippmann TPX is a low-cost, high-performance paintball pistol. Eight- or seven-round magazines are inserted into the bottom of the grip like a normal pistol. The pistol features an A5/X7 threaded barrel, making it compatible with all A5/X7 barrels that are 7/8 inch in outer diameter. The TPX can also be powered on both HPA or CO_{2} by an external source using an adapter or can utilize a 12 gram cartridge that is inserted into a chamber under the barrel. Similar to Tippman's other markers, the TPX utilizes the "clamshell" design and in place of metal uses a high-impact polymer to help keep down the weight.

The Tippmann TiPX is the second generation of the pistol. The second generation mostly included fixes to the valve and regulator, and also combined them both into one solid piece. The Tru-Feed magazine was also introduced to correct misfeeding that the 8-round magazines would occasionally have. Tippmann has been known to send owners of the TPX new TiPX internals in trade for the old ones, and also trade in the old 8-round magazines for the 7-round Tru-Feed magazines.

Accessories for the pistol include the Remote Line Adapter kit, which allows users to use an external continuous air source like HPA or CO_{2}. Tippmann's Hammerhead barrels will also fit, and they sell leg holsters and spare magazines compatible with the pistol.

==== U.S. ARMY Line ====
The U.S. ARMY line of paintball markers is produced by Tippmann in partnership and licensed under the U.S. ARMY name.

=== Alpha Black Elite ===
The Alpha Black Elite (Bravo One outside the US) is a blowback design modeled after the 98 Custom, using "clamshell" body halves. In 2013, the Alpha Black was re-designed to use body halves similar to that of the "Project Salvo", but retaining its M16 look. With the redesign, Tippmann added on their removable M16 carry handle, and re-designed the handguard to feature a Picatinny rail to allow the use of foregrips.

The Alpha Black Elite still has 3 variants similar to that of the Alpha Black. The Alpha Black Elite, consisting of just the marker and its accessories. The Alpha Black Elite Powerpack, consisting of the marker, and a beginners kit made of a mask, 9 oz (260 g) CO_{2} tank and hopper. And the Alpha Black Elite with E-Grip which is the same as the "Alpha Black Elite" but with added E-Grip internals.

=== Project Salvo ===
The Project Salvo (Sierra One outside the US) is a blowback design similar to the 98 Custom using "clamshell" body halves molded to resemble the AR-15. To date, there is only 1 version of the Project Salvo being sold by Tippmann. The Project Salvo comes with an AR-15 styled handguard with 4 picatinny rails. It also comes with a 6-position collapsible stock that also folds to the right of the marker. The entire top of the marker is flat-topped and is also grooved to work as a picatinny rail, allowing the use of sights and scopes and also handles.

Tippmann also produces upgrades for the Project Salvo including the Response Trigger, eGrip and Cyclone feed system. The Project Salvo utilizes the same "quick-thread" design that the 98 Custom uses so 98 Custom Flatline and barrel upgrades can be used.

=== Carver One ===
The Carver One (Tango One outside the US) is a blowback design similar to the 98 Custom using "clamshell" body halves molded to resemble the M4. It also has three small picatinny rails toward the front to allow the use of flashlights, foregrips and bipods, as well as a picatinny rail along the top to allow the use of sights, scopes and handles. To date, there are 3 versions of the Carver One being sold by Tippmann. The "basic" version comes with only the Carver One. The "Carver One PowerPack" version comes with the Carver One, and like the Alpha Black PowerPack, the Carver One also comes with a 9 oz (260 g) CO_{2} tank, a 200-round gravity hopper and the TP420 goggle system. The "Carver One + eGrip" version comes with the basic Carver One with the eGrip internals installed.

As of 2012, Tippmann has started including a vertical foregrip with the Carver One on all of its versions.

The Carver One utilizes the same "quick-thread" design that the 98 Custom uses so 98 Custom barrel upgrades can be used. Because of the body design, the Cyclone feed system and Flatline systems cannot be used on the Carver One.

== Additional Equipment and Technologies ==
=== A.C.T. ===
Tippmann recently introduced a feature known as A.C.T. (Anti-Chop Technology), which is a mechanical system integrated into the bolt system to reduce the chance of jams due to misfed paintballs. In the 98 Custom and Custom Pro markers, the hammer has a deep groove that the linkage arm sits in, along with the ACT spring to keep it in position (there is also a small hole to insert the linkage arm into if the user chooses not to use the ACT function). If a paintball is incorrectly fed into the breech when the bolt is closing, the bolt stops on the paintball with little pressure from the ACT spring, while the hammer continues on its stroke unlinked to the bolt. It hits the valve and is blown back open, where it re-engages the linkage arm and retracts the bolt, letting the paintball fall into the breech correctly. The marker is now ready to fire again. The Tippmann A.C.T feature is very similar to Spyder's ACS bolt.

=== Cyclone Feed System ===
Much like the Response Trigger System, the Cyclone Feed System uses the excess gas from firing the marker to cycle a feeding mechanism providing up to 15 balls per second. (Some have tested the unit at 20+ Balls Per Second with some commercially available modifications.) In comparison with conventional hoppers, the Cyclone has a much wider mouth, holding multiple paintballs in the feeding mechanism even without a hopper.

As a shot is fired, excess (normally waste) gas from the shot is scavenged through the side of the marker via a banjo fitting (a T-type fitting is required for use with the response trigger system). The gas is utilized to rotate the cyclone as the marker re-cocks, force-feeding a paintball into the chamber. The Cyclone Feed System comes standard on the Tippmann A-5 and an enhanced version comes on the X-7. Tippmann offers Cyclone upgrades for 98 Custom and Custom Pro users. The advent of the Cyclone Feed System marks the first widely used, non-electronic, agitated hopper. The lack of electronics means the user can expose the system to moisture (rain, snow, etc.) which would interfere with or destroy other mechanical systems.

The Cyclone feed concept first appeared on the Tippmann F/A as a spring-operated system that required manual rewinding.

=== Response Trigger System ===
The Response Trigger System is a firing system available for current production Tippmann paintball guns. The system uses a series of parts that are added to the gun to greatly increase the firing rate for the marker. The system uses excess carbon dioxide or compressed air from the firing process to reset the trigger and sear with a pneumatic cylinder. The cylinder can reset the trigger with only moderate pressure. When this happens, the pressure of the finger immediately pulls the trigger back again, firing another shot. If the operator utilizes the correct amount of pressure on the trigger, a "bouncing" effect occurs, resulting in fully automatic-like fire for the duration of the time that the operator can maintain that amount of pressure (commonly known as the "sweet spot"). As such, its use has been restricted to single-shot operation at some commercial paintball fields while banned completely at others.

The Response Trigger System is available on the 98 Custom, Custom Pro, A-5, and X-7 markers. It can also be installed in the Model 98 with modification (tapping the powertube and allowing space in the grip for the cylinder).

=== E-Grip ===
The E-Grip is an electronic means of firing the marker. Utilizing battery-operated components, the E-Grip replaces the trigger function, to where the trigger simply closes a micro switch. The switch sends a signal to a small circuit board, activating a solenoid. The solenoid uses a push rod to actuate the sear in this system. The board has multiple firing modes, allowing semi-automatic, burst, automatic and other modes. A few models of boards are available from different manufacturers, with different features, but the same dimensions to fit into the guides in the grip.

The term E-Grip is usually applied to the system in the A-5 and X-7 markers because they use a removable grip frame that contains all the electronics. The term E-Trigger is applied to the US Army and 98 Custom lines.

=== Flatline Barrel System ===
The Flatline barrel is a curved paintball barrel using a slight arch in combination with a rough inner surface texture to create backspin on the ball which flattens the trajectory. The range can increase to upwards of 250 ft (76 m) (100 ft (30 m) over a standard barrel). With a regular paintball barrel, a player will often have to raise the angle at which he/she is shooting in order to reach the opposing player. The accuracy of this barrel system is dependent on more factors than a standard barrel. With backspin being put on the paintball, inconsistency in the shape of a paintball will create unusual trajectories. Another disadvantage is its tendency to break thin shelled paintballs more easily due to the increased friction. However, this can be remedied by avoiding the use of low-grade paintballs.

The 98 Custom Flatline barrel must be re-adjusted for accuracy whenever it is removed and reinstalled. Therefore, it's a good idea to "mark" where the barrel is aligned for reinstallment. The barrel is surrounded by a plastic shroud that hides the curved barrel and integrates a sight system replacing the marker sight, this is required as the barrel curves above the marker's normal sight system. The shroud also has a picatinny rail for mounting accessories that attach onto a rail system.

The A-5 Flatline barrel doesn't change the normal sight rail system. It resembles a large suppressor though it does not operate as one - in fact the barrel system does not have any porting and is therefore louder than a typical paintball barrel. The A-5 Flatline system can be removed and installed to the same position, making it unnecessary to adjust, unlike its predecessor.

It is also important to keep the marker adjusted to no more than 300 ft/s (91 m/s), 275 ft/s (84 m/s) being the most effective velocity, for higher velocities cause paintballs to curve upwards before reaching their maximum distance, which in turn decreases the barrel's normally high effective range. Tilting the barrel to the left or right will also cause the trajectory to be altered in that direction.

=== Paint Grenades ===
Tippmann offers a small line of paintball grenades, all using the same basic design but coming in a variety of sizes. Due to the safety hazards and field regulations of using explosives, they use an expanded bladder filled with a paint mix similar to that in a paintball. To activate them, the user releases a clasp and throws the grenade, to which releases its contact and spins upon impact. In 2013, Tippmann re-designed their larger grenade, the Big Boy to have a pull-pin type clasp to simulate a real grenade pin.

== Previous and Discontinued products ==
=== Alpha Black ===
The Alpha Black (Bravo One outside the US) is a blowback design using the 98 Custom internals but instead using "clamshell" body halves molded to resemble the M16. To date, there are 4 different versions of the Alpha Black currently being sold by Tippmann. The "Basic" version is simply the Alpha Black with nothing else but the barrel. The "Tactical" version comes with a molded plastic M16 styled handguard, barrel and a 6-position collapsible stock. The "Tactical PowerPack" comes with all of the Tactical aesthetic upgrades plus a 9 oz (260 g) CO_{2} tank, a 200-round gravity hopper and the TP420 goggle system. The "Tactical + eGrip" comes with everything the Tactical version does but with the added eGrip internals to allow for burst fire and full-auto shooting.

The Alpha Black can also be found sold with a Digital Camo finish but only in the Tactical version. The handguard, grip panels and stock are also molded out of a different color plastic to match.

Tippmann also produces upgrades for the Alpha Black including the eGrip and Cyclone feed system. The Alpha Black utilizes the same "quick-thread" design that the 98 Custom uses so 98 Custom Flatline and barrel upgrades can be used.

It is still commonly found.

=== Custom Pro ===
The Tippmann Custom Pro was an upgraded version of the 98 Custom. It featured a double trigger, drop-forward, longer barrel, and later models had Anti-chop technology. The marker also featured a scratch-resistant powdercoat on later models, and also had models that utilized the E-Trigger system.

=== X-7 ===
On November 20, 2006, Tippmann launched their X-7 marker product line in cooperation with Special Ops Paintball. Tippmann marketed the X-7 as the most customizable marker on the market. The marker was sold as either a basic model, a response trigger edition or an E-grip edition (the latter using a Hall effect sensor for select fire modes).

It had a mechanical design similar to the A-5, while featuring an upgraded cyclone feed that can achieve up to 20 balls per second. Accessories built specifically for the A-5 receiver could not be used with the X-7 (and vice versa). It featured a MilSim body design, including an array of picatinny rails, a strong lightweight magnesium receiver, a low profile cyclone hopper, and an M16 magazine shaped tool kit.

=== C-3 ===
The C-3, with PEP technology, was a paintball marker produced by Tippmann - and is the first paintball marker to run on propane. The C-3 was discontinued in 2006, and no plans have been announced to release another propane-powered marker.

=== SMG ===
The SMG-60 was the first fully automatic paintball marker on the market. It is modeled on the appearance of the British STEN of World War II. The marker is .62 caliber, has a fixed steel barrel, and uses three stripper clips of five balls each (or four clips if using the extended 20-round magazine); the fire rate is 10 paintballs per second, therefore an entire standard magazine can be emptied in about 1.5 seconds. The rate of fire was deliberately limited by the use of a heavy hammer and maintained by a valve designed to use liquid CO_{2}. Some versions offered a 2-stage trigger (similar to those on firearms such as the Steyr AUG) in which a short pull produces semi-automatic fire and a long pull produces full-auto.

The SMG-68 is a .68 caliber version of the SMG-60, configured for semi-automatic operation, and featuring a removable barrel. Tippmann offered a trade-in for SMG-68's to be converted into 68 Specials, by adding a front bolt and external linkage arm.

=== SL-68 ===
The SL-68 was a pump gun designed for improved durability over prior product designs. The body was constructed from a cast and machined magnesium aluminum alloy, and the hopper adapter was integrated into the body casting, reducing the overall number of parts. The pump handle was originally manufactured with a cast metal, but was later replaced with a fiber-reinforced plastic. A squeegee could be stored in the pump handle, and a breech port could be used to quickly clean the barrel.

=== 68 Special ===
The 68 Special was an inline poppet valve design. It was a retrofit of the SMG-60/68, designed to fire from a hopper instead of clips. The rear half of the body is identical to the SMG (early conversions even retained the "SMG 68" sticker), while the front half was cut off and replaced with a hopper fed breach. A bolt and external linkage arm was also added. One interesting feature about this gun is that the hammer can be moved out of position into a safety position preventing the gun from being able to fire, like the PMI-3/VM-68 and firearms such as the Sten and MP40. It had a built-in back bottle setup that ran on liquid CO_{2} and was very inefficient, due to the small valve and heavy hammer (nearly 1 pound). It was one of the first semi-auto markers on the market, and cycled at 6 balls per second - very fast considering the loader technology at the time.

=== SL-68 II ===
A pump marker, the Tippmann SL-68 II superseded the original SL-68, adding anti-double feed and modified breech features. Most importantly, the constant-air adapter was relocated to an ergonomic position in the base of the cast grip frame meaning that players could easily aim with a full mask on. It was discontinued in 2003, reintroduced to the market in 2009, and then discontinued again in 2012.

=== Pro-AM ===
The Pro-Am is an open bolt semi-automatic marker. Early models had cast metal foregrips and pistol grips (the Pro-Am), while later models had composite foregrips and grip frames (the Pro-Lite). The loader connection was built into the foregrip, and by clicking the foregrip forward with a sear at the front of the gun the paint was kept from feeding, and the breech became open to clean the gun with a pull through squeegee. This allowed a player to clean the gun really fast with a pull through squeegee, without removing the barrel or removing the loader. Like all Tippmann markers, the Pro-Am was nearly indestructible and an extremely reliable gun. While the Pro-Am was like the 68 Special in layout, being an inline poppet valve design, it was a major change in design, with a different body, valve, breech, hammer, hammer to bolt linkage, and sear arrangements. Additionally, the tank was moved to below the grip frame for better balance and to allow different bottom line arrangements and stocks, instead of the Lone Star (M-16 style) grip that had been on the previous Tippmann Semi/Full Auto lines. It was also the first Tippmann Semi-Auto that didn't require a siphon tank to run liquid CO_{2}, even though it could in colder weather without any problems.

=== Pro-Lite\Mini-Lite ===
The Pro-Lite is a semi-automatic open bolt marker. It is nearly identical to the Pro-Am differing only in the materials used to make the foregrip and pistol grip. The Pro-Lite used composite plastic while early Pro-Ams used cast metal foregrips and pistol grips (later Pro-Am models used composite foregrips). The difference in materials made the Pro-Lite considerably lighter than its predecessor. Like the Pro-Am, the Pro-Lite was designed for durability and is extremely reliable. Paintball Fields commonly used Pro-Lites as rentals because of their ease of maintenance and ability to take extreme abuse. The Mini-Lite is essentially a Pro-Lite with an extra CA adapter mounted just behind the foregrip.

=== Factory F/A ===
The F/A was a select fire, force fed, blowback paintball gun based on the Pro-Am/Pro-Lite body, with the Star feed apparatus on the side. It can be said that the F/A's Star feed, which is close in function to the modern Cyclone feed, is the predecessor to the A-5. The F/A could be switched between safe, semi, and fully automatic firing via a fire selector lever. The full-auto setting changed the sear from a disconnecting version (used in semi-auto) to a full open sear. It used a hydraulic key/linkage/shock style system to slow the rate of fire by dragging 2 sets of keys on the top of the hammer. Although the rate of fire was adjustable from a few shots a second to around 20, the adjustments were seen as "tricky" by some users (although that was a small price to pay for such awesome firepower). Also, the Star feed required manual winding, and no other loaders on the market could feed a marker at that rate of fire. This feed system was prone to breaking paint, partially due to the spring tension, and partially due to the heavy action of older Tippmanns. The F/A, like the Pro-Lite and Carbine series, shares barrel threading and basic valve design with the A-5.

=== Pro-Carbine and .68 Carbine ===
The .68 Carbine was developed as a lighter and more customizable version of the Pro-Lite, featuring a .45 grip frame, a simplified feed neck that was not part of the forearm grip, and now-standard bottom line ASA adapter. Like the Pro-Lite, it was durable, accurate, and required minimal maintenance. The feed neck turned out to be the only weak spot, which led to the development of a new model, a combination of the Pro-Lite forearm breech and the Carbine receiver. This new model was named the Pro-Carbine. Pro-Carbine Barrels will fit Pro-Lite, .68 Carbine, and A-5 Models. They will NOT fit the Model 98.

The Pro-Carbine is a popular rental gun at paintball fields. It is semi-automatic and is known for its durability and reliable function. The Pro-Carbine is also known for its "rifle-like" forearm grip and Thompson SMG Style Action (even though it's only a Mechanical Semi Automatic). This gives the gun an appearance that is similar to that of a real-life rifle. It is a popular woodsball/scenario marker due to its focused upgradability toward MilSim, but is less popular in speedball or Tourney games due to its handling, weight characteristics and slower rate of fire.

=== Model 98 ===
The Tippmann model 98 is the original version of the 98 custom. One of the workhorses of the Tippmann line, it has been superseded by the 98 Custom and the Custom Pro.

The shells were redesigned for the model 98 custom key changes included:

- a removable trigger guard (previously part of the shell)
- elimination of the gills on the front of the marker
- internal changes to the shells to allow the addition of other aftermarket parts namely the reactive trigger system.

Special Note: New style thread flatline barrels will fit both the old thread and new thread guns.

=== Triumph ===
The .68 caliber Triumph series was launched in 2006 by Tippman Pneumatics; the marker is an entry-level model, which departs from the Tippman standard MilSim design. The three basic models include the XL semi-automatic (with 8 1/2 in (220 mm) basic barrel), XT semi-automatic (adding an expansion chamber, front grip assembly and 11-inch barrel), and eXT Electronic - which operates at fully automatic twelve or fifteen BPS, single-shot, or three round burst. The markers all feature a high-impact composite body, double trigger, a center feed neck, in-line bolt system and a 200-round gravity feed hopper.
