= Shockey =

Shockey is a surname. Notable people with the surname include:

- Eva Shockey, Canadian Author, Hunter, TV Personality, Blogger
- Hal Shockey, Canadian outdoorsman
- Jeff Shockey, US lobbyist and Congressional staffer
- Jeremy Shockey, American football player
- Jim Shockey, Canadian outdoor writer, professional big game outfitter, TV Producer and Host
- Peter Shockey, filmmaker and screenwriter
- Gwen Shockey, American artist

== See also ==
- Shockey Peak, 2010 m, southeast of Allen Peak near the north extremity of the main ridge of the Sentinel Range, Antarctica
- Shockeysville, Virginia, an unincorporated community in northern Frederick County, Virginia
