= Bipartisan Sportsmen's Act of 2014 =

Proposed United States legislation

- Long title: A bill to protect and enhance opportunities for recreational hunting, fishing, and shooting, and for other purposes.
- Announced in: the 113th United States Congress
- Sponsored by: Sen. Kay Hagan (D-NC)

Legislative history
- Introduced in the Senate as S. 2363 by Sen. Kay Hagan (D-NC) on May 20, 2014

The Bipartisan Sportsmen's Act of 2014 (S. 2363) is a bill related to hunting, fishing, and outdoor recreation in the United States.

The bill was introduced into the United States Senate during the 113th United States Congress.

== Background ==
Thirteen different bills were identified as "related bills" to the Bipartisan Sportsmen's Act of 2014, including the Permanent Electronic Duck Stamp Act of 2013 (passed in the House on June 3, 2013) and the Sportsmen’s Heritage And Recreational Enhancement Act of 2013 (H.R. 3590; 113th Congress) (passed in the House on February 5, 2014).

== Provisions ==
- The bill would "exempt ammunition and fishing tackle that contain lead from being regulated by the Toxic Substances Control Act.
- The bill would allow states to issue electronic duck stamps, instead of forcing hunters to wait for physical stamps.
- The bill would provide grants for wetland conservation.

== Procedural history ==
The Bipartisan Sportsmen's Act of 2014 was introduced into the United States Senate on May 20, 2014 by Sen. Kay Hagan (D-NC). The bill was not referred to any Senate committees.

== Debate and discussion ==
The Rocky Mountain Elk Foundation urged members to support the bill, saying that it considers the bill "to be of vital importance for conservation, wildlife, and sportsmen and women." The Rocky Mountain Elk Foundation said that they supported the bill because it "protects the use of traditional ammunition, allows more flexibility for federal funds to be used to build and maintain ranges on public lands and ensures access to federal lands for hunting, shooting and other outdoor activities."

Senator Roger Wicker (R-MS) supported the bill, saying that "Mississippians know the importance of efforts to preserve our natural resources for future generations." Senator Thad Cochran (R-MS) also supported the bill, arguing that the bill "deserves broad support for its policies and reforms that will protect and enhance opportunities to hunt, fish and enjoy the outdoors." The National Shooting Sports Foundation (NSSF) supported the bill and thanked Cochran for his support, saying that "Senator Cochran's advocacy will help in the fight to promote, preserve, and protect our cherished outdoor heritage and defend against the radical anti-hunting activists determined to derail this important legislation."

The Animal Welfare Institute opposed the bill, calling it "an attack on our nation's wild animals and habitat." According to the organization, the bill would "eliminate the Environmental Protection Agency's authority under the Toxic Substances Control Act to regulate hazardous substances - including lead, a dangerous neurotoxin - released by ammunition and sport fishing waste."

== See also ==
- List of bills in the 113th United States Congress
