= Crosman 1377 =

- Crosman 1377C Air Pistol
- Type: Air pistol
- Place of origin: United States

Production history
- Manufacturer: Crosman Corporation
- Unit cost: USD 60±
- Produced: 1977 to present
- Variants: Crosman 1322

Specifications
- Mass: 2 lb.
- Length: 13.63"
- Cartridge: Pellet
- Caliber: .177
- Action: Bolt action, pneumatic pump
- Rate of fire: Single shot
- Muzzle velocity: up to 600 feet per second (180 m/s)
- Effective firing range: 30 feet (9 meters)
- Feed system: Manual
- Sights: Open

The Crosman model 1377 (also known as the "American Classic") is a single-shot, bolt-action, pneumatic .177 caliber pellet gun, featuring a rifled steel barrel and imitation wood checkered plastic grips. The 1377 was introduced in 1977, and has been in continuous production ever since. A separately available shoulder stock (which Crosman designates model 1399) converts the rather long pistol into a carbine. The 1377 is not a competition level target airgun, but its long-rifled barrel makes it fairly accurate.

Atypical for modern pneumatic air pistols (which are mostly charged with a single action of a lever-action pump), the 1377 can be pumped to various levels; Crosman recommends at least three pumps to ensure that the pellet clears the barrel, but as many as ten pumps are advised by the manual. Crosman claims a pellet velocity of up to 600 ft/s (180 m/s) from a gun pumped ten times, which is higher than that achieved by most pellet pistols of any kind. Many 1377 owners report success with only a few pumps, and the lower velocity is accompanied by lower noise, often an advantage for those shooting indoors.

The gun is noted for being highly modifiable: a cottage industry has formed to provide its enthusiasts with parts and accessories. Examples of common modifications are custom grips and forearms to replace the factory plastic parts, custom triggers for lighter and smoother trigger pull force, custom breeches, bolts and sights, and special piston assemblies to increase pellet velocity.

== Overview ==
There are at least 2 versions: the 1377 that is exported to Canada has a special valve relief that will keep the power output of the gun under the legal limit.

Newer 1377 models are known as the 1377c. These models lack a magnetized bolt for easier use with BBs, although steel BBs will damage the rifling of the barrel. The PC77, or "Pumpmaster 77", is essentially a 1377c with different stamped markings and black plastic for sale at a lower price point.

Several iterations of the 1377 exist. Models include:

- First variant with steel breech and sliding breech cover, Phase I, 1977–1981
- Second variant with plastic breech Pellet/BB, Phase II, 1981–1999
- Third variant with plastic breech for pellet only, Phase III, 1999–present

== See also ==
- Crosman
- Crosman Nightstalker
