= U.S. Sportsmen's Alliance =

Non Profit Organisation

The U.S. Sportsmen's Alliance is a non-profit organization based in Columbus, Ohio, United States, that was formed in 1977. The Alliance defends the rights of hunters, anglers, trappers, and sport shooters.

== History ==
The U.S. Sportsmen's Alliance was originally known as the Wildlife Legislative Fund of America and Wildlife Conservation Fund of America and was formed in 1977 after an Ohio Ballot threatened Ohio's trapping community. The organization was officially incorporated in 1978 as The U.S. Sportsmen's Alliance. Throughout the years the Alliance has worked on numerous bills and ballot issues that deal with hunters' rights.

== Advocacy ==
The U.S. Sportsmen's Alliance mostly speaks out against animal rights groups in favor of the rights of hunters, trappers, and other sports shooters.

Maine's chapter of The U.S. Sportsmen's Alliance spoke out against a proposed state park in Maine that would take away access to a large amount of public land that was used largely for recreational activities like hunting and snowmobiling.

In 2004, there was a disagreement on whether or not to hold a black bear hunting season in New Jersey. The DEP Commissioner Bradley Campbell wrote a letter to Council Chair W. Scott Ellis requesting to not hold a black bear hunting season, but the season was scheduled for December 6–11, 2004. Campbell then used his authority to refuse to issue hunting licenses to hunters for black bears. The U.S. Sportsmen's Alliance filed an unsuccessful lawsuit against the New Jersey Department of Environmental Protection (DEP) which challenged Campbell's authority to refuse hunting licenses.

The U.S. Sportsmen's Alliance spoke out in favor of the Sportsmen’s Heritage And Recreational Enhancement Act of 2013 (H.R. 3590; 113th Congress). It urged members to call their representatives in Congress and ask them to vote in favor of the bill. The bill is an omnibus bill that covers several firearms, fishing, hunting, and federal land laws. It passed the United States House of Representatives on February 5, 2014.

== Programs ==
Families Afield was created in collaboration with the National Shooting Sports Foundation, and the National Wild Turkey Federation and works to get more involvement of women and families in hunting. The program created the "apprentice" hunting license that allows someone who has not completed hunter's safety to accompany an experienced hunter on a hunt.

Outdoor Business Council is a program that was created to unite all of the outdoors businesses under one organization to help protect the rights of outdoorsmen all over the United States.
