= Crosman =

American designer and manufacturer of shooting sport products

Crosman Corporation
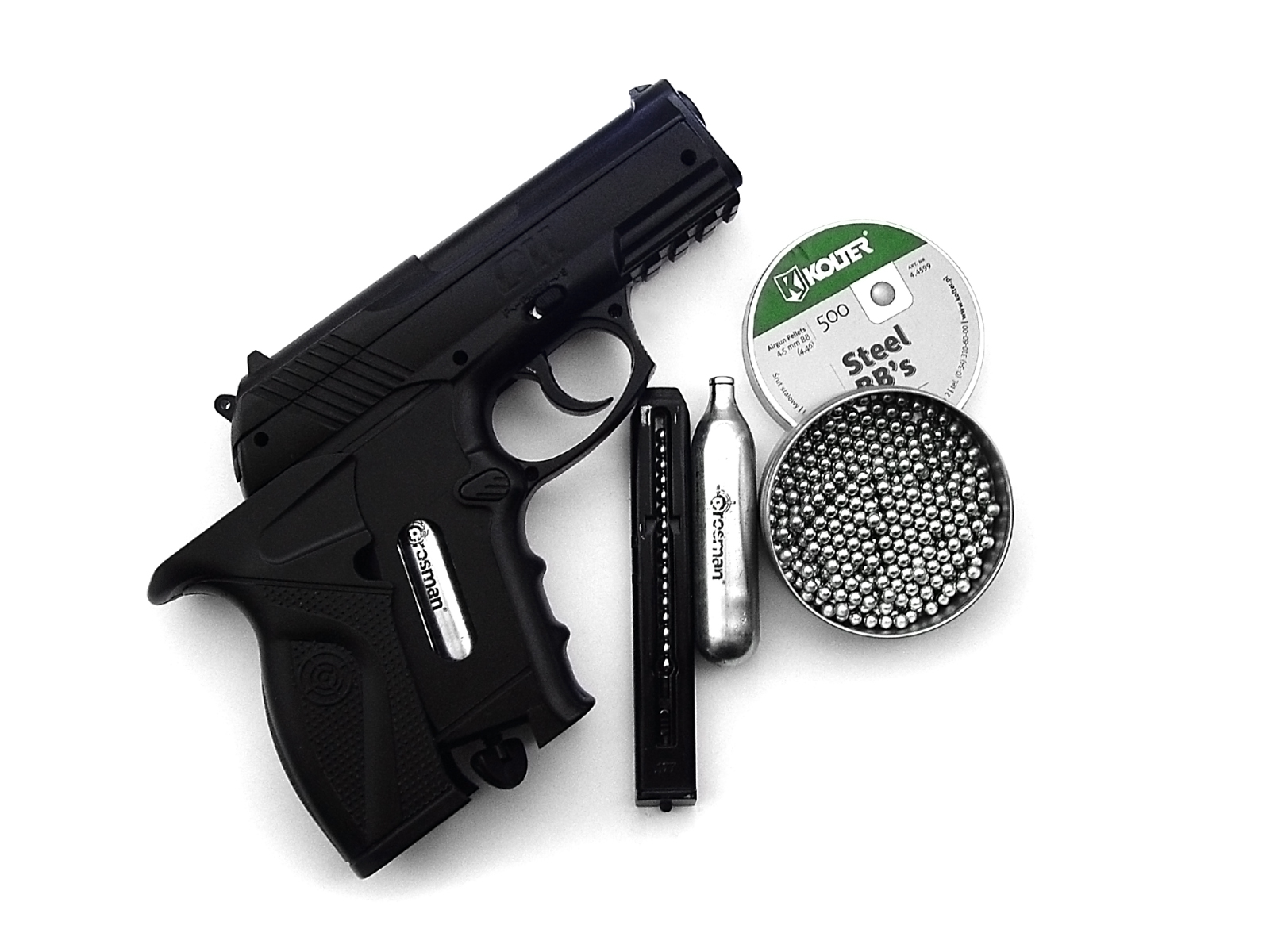
- Type: Subsidiary
- Industry: Air Rifles, Airsoft
- Founded: 1924
- Founder: Frank Hahn
- Headquarters: Bloomfield, New York, U.S.
- Parent: Daisy
- Website: www.crosman.com

Crosman Corporation is an American designer and manufacturer of shooting sport products, with a long-standing presence in airgun design and a tradition of producing pellet and BB guns. Crosman is also a producer of many varieties of airgun and airsoft ammunition and CO_{2} Powerlet cartridges. In addition, Crosman sells branded, licensed products as well as a variety of airsoft guns.

== History ==
Crosman was incorporated in 1924 as Crosman Rifle Company, after the sale of "Crosman Brothers" to Frank Hahn. The firm was based in Fairport, New York, a suburb of Rochester (from the print on the bottom of free vintage targets available as a pdf on the company's website). In 1960 it was acquired by Bangor Punta Corp. In 1970, the company moved to a small town in the finger lakes region, East Bloomfield.

Crosman's first models were the traditional American multi-pump pneumatic design, where 3 to 10 pumps would pressurize a reservoir for each shot. Descendants of these original models are still made, in rifle, pistol and carbine form, and they remain quite popular. In 1992, Crosman acquired the Benjamin Sheridan company's assets.

From 1971 through 1989, Coleman of Wichita, Kansas owned Crosman. In 1989, MacAndrews & Forbes Holdings of New York acquired Coleman and sold Crosman to Worldwide Sports and Recreation. In 1997, an investment group headed by Leonard Pickett purchased the company. Pickett was named CEO and held that position until his death in 2000. Ken D'Arcy served as CEO from 1997 to 2012.

In 2011, Wellspring Capital Management purchased Crosman and in August 2012 Phil Dolci was named CEO and served until May 2015. Brad Johnson was named as Executive Chairman and Interim CEO while remaining Chairman & CEO of United Sporting Companies, a separate company that is also part of the Wellspring portfolio.

In June 2017, Wellspring sold Crosman to Compass Diversified Holdings, INC (NYSE: CODI). Upon the sale of the company, Robert Beckwith was appointed the new CEO. Robert had previously been the CFO under Brad Johnson.

In May 2024, Crosman was sold to Daisy, which is a portfolio company of BRS & Co.

=== Benjamin ===
In 1882, Walter R. Benjamin of St. Louis, Missouri, introduced the first Benjamin air rifle. These Benjamin Pump guns were manufactured by the Wissler Instrument Co. of St. Louis under a U.S. patent that had been issued to Benjamin. Unlike many air guns of this period, the Benjamin was intended not as a toy, but as a high-power compressed air gun in which pressure was built up by pumping a built-in piston located beneath the barrel.

The Benjamin Air Rifle Company was formed in 1902 when Walter R. Benjamin purchased the patent rights from the defunct St. Louis Air Rifle Company. Production from 1902 to 1904 and from 1906 to 1986 was in St. Louis. In 1977, the Benjamin Air Rifle Company purchased Sheridan Products in Racine, Wisconsin. Benjamin and Sheridan were acquired by Crosman in 1992. By 2015, Benjamin was positioned as Crosman Corporation's adult hunting and high performance line and Sheridan had its name on one model: the Cowboy, a youth-oriented lever action.

== CO_{2} ==
In the 1930s, Crosman began to experiment with CO_{2} power. Like other CO_{2} guns of the day, they were bulk fill, which meant that liquid CO_{2} was loaded into a pressurized reservoir on the gun. Other manufacturers started to use 8 gram CO_{2} bulbs used in soda dispensers. Crosman capitalized on this in 1954 by introducing a new 12 gram CO_{2} bulb, called a Powerlet. The new Powerlet gave more shots per bulb than the soda bulb, and with the addition of a simple spacer, a Powerlet gun could use the shorter 8 gram bulb.

=== Powerlet ===
A box of Crosman CO_{2} Powerlets

A Powerlet cartridge, commonly referred to as a CO_{2} charger, is a small disposable metal gas cylinder holding 8–12 grams (0.28–0.42 oz) of liquid CO_{2} and often a small quantity of lubricating oil, used as a pneumatic power source for certain air guns, airsoft guns, paintball guns, carbonation, and for quick inflation of various devices such as a personal flotation device. Originally developed and the trademark owned by Crosman Corporation and introduced to the market in 1954, the Powerlet CO_{2} cartridge has become the dominant source of power for inexpensive, rapid fire air guns from many manufacturers.

Typically manufactured from the same steel alloys and using the same metal spinning fabrication processes as much larger refillable gas cylinders, a Powerlet cartridge typically provides 20 to 40 shots in an airgun, depending on the gun and environmental conditions. The first 10 shots from a new bottle are consistent, with subsequent shots losing power. For paintball markers, fewer shots are produced due to the greater weight of the paintball compared to an airgun projectile.

For modern paintball guns, this technology is considered outdated, as they cannot fire as many shots as a modern large-capacity CO_{2} tank can provide, though some still use Powerlet cartridges for stock paintball. They are also still favored for paintball pistols, for players wishing to run "light" with considerably less weight. Because liquid CO_{2} needs to vaporize to gaseous form to be usable, latent heat is absorbed every time a shot is discharged, cooling the canister. When discharging repeatedly, the temperature within the Powerlet canister can drop low enough to affect the vapor-liquid equilibrium and reduce the vapor pressure significantly. The drop in output pressure (known as the "working pressure") not only can affect the ballistic performance, but also can cause the gun to "freeze up" and cease operating completely due to insufficient pneumatic force, until the canister warms back up again. This causes a problem due to the rapid-fire nature of many competitive paintball skirmishes, so the high-pressure air (HPA, or "N_{2}") systems are more commonly used.

In 2004, Crosman introduced a new disposable CO_{2} power source, the 88 gram AirSource.

== Current models ==
=== Air pistols ===
- 1377 "American Classic" pneumatic
- 1322 "Medalist" pneumatic
- Stinger P311
- 2240 CO_{2} pistol
- 2300S CO_{2} pistol
- 2300T CO_{2} pistol
- 2300KT custom CO_{2} pistol
- 3576 CO_{2} revolver (previously available in .50 paintball and 6 mm airsoft)
- 1008 "Repeatair" CO_{2} pistol
- T4 CO_{2} pistol (modeled after Glock series)
- Pro 77 CO_{2} pistol
- C11 CO_{2} pistol (modeled after the Beretta 8000 series)
- C21 CO_{2} pistol
- C41 CO_{2} pistol
- Marauder PCP (pre-charged pneumatic)
- Vigilante CO_{2}
- USMC MOS 5811 Military Police (not released as of 3/15/14)
- Wildcat
- Maximus PCP
- Marauder Woods Walker
- Trail NP Break Barrel Pistol
- 1720T Target PCP Pistol
- PC77 Pumpmaster Classic (previously a Walmart special)
- 1701P Silhouette PCP Pistol
- 1911 BB CO_{2} Pistol
- TAC 1911 BB CO_{2} Pistol
- GI MODEL 1911BBb CO_{2} Pistol
- Survivalist CO_{2} Pistol

=== Air rifles ===
==== Spring piston ====
- Fury II Blackout
- Marlin® Classic (BB)
- Optimus
- Phantom 1000
- Phantom 1000x
- Phantom 500 (.22) (Canadian version, 495FPS)
- Quest 500x (Canadian version, 495fps)
- Raven

===== Nitro piston =====
- Crusher
- DPMS Classic A4 Nitro Piston
- Fire NP
- Fury NP
- Genesis NP
- Incursion Nitro Piston
- Jim Shockey Steel Eagle
- Eva Shockey Golden Eagle
- Mayhem
- Nitro Venom
- Nitro Venom Dusk
- Phantom NP
- Phoenix
- Rogue
- Shockwave NP
- Silver Fox Nitro Piston
- Stealth Shot Nitro Piston
- MTR77NP*
- TR77NP*
- Vantage NP
- Varmint power pack
- Benjamin Genesis
- Benjamin NPS
- Benjamin Prowler
- Benjamin Summit
- Benjamin Titan NP*
- Benjamin Titan XS
- Benjamin Trail NP*
- Benjamin Trail NP XL*
- Benjamin Trail NP2*
- Benjamin Trail NP2 Synthetic

==== Pump pneumatic ====
- 664x Powermaster (Walmart special)
- 760 Pumpmaster*
- 2100 Classic
- 2289 pneumatic rifle (sold in Doomsday pack)
- AirMaster
- Bushmaster ACR Dual Ammo Air Rifle
- Cowboy
- M4-177*
- MK-177
- Legacy (Jim Shockey Signature Series)*
- Powermaster 66 Kit
- Recruit
- Torrent SX
- USMC MOS 0311 Rifleman
- Benjamin 347
- Benjamin 392
- Benjamin 397

- 766 American Classic 1-3

==== PCP ====
- Armada
- Bulldog*
- Challenger*
- Marauder*
- Maximus*
- MAR177 PCP conversion Kit (fits on an AR lower)
- Wildfire
- Pioneer Airbow
- Benjamin Discovery*
- Benjamin Rogue

==== CO_{2} ====
- 1077 "RepeatAir" CO_{2} rifle with 12-round magazine and plastic stock (extremely quiet, popular in Europe due to cramped parcel sizes)
- 2400KT custom shop CO_{2} carbine
- Comrade AK
- MK-45
- Heritage 2260 (Limited Edition)
- Outdoorsman Carbine
- Full & semi Auto R1
- DPMS SBR
- MPW Bushmaster

Includes Variants*

=== Airsoft guns ===
- Spring Rifles: Stinger R32 (Modeled after H&K G36C), Stinger R34 (Modeled after the M-4), Sniper R38, (Modeled after Colt Model 653 M16A1 carbine), Stinger R39 (Modeled after Knight's PDW)
- Spring Pistols: Stinger P32, Stinger P36, Stinger P9, P312, P311, p312kt Stinger P30, Walther P22, and Walther P99
- Spring Shotguns: Stinger S32p (Modeled after M87SA), Stinger S30, Stinger s34p Wingmaster and Remington TAC-1
- Electric Rifles: Pulse R70 (Modeled after M4 SOPMOD), Pulse R72 (Modeled after H&K G3A3), Pulse R73(Modelled after the AR-15), Pulse R74, NightProwler SA (Modeled after Beretta Cx4 Storm), Pulse R71 (Modeled after H&K MP5 RAS), Tac R71 (Modeled after H&k mp5k) Pulse R76 (Modeled after the Russian AK74U). Pulse R78 (modeled after the M4). The Newest AEG gun crosman came out with.
- Electric Pistols: Pulse p50 and the Pulse p72, and the Colt M1911
- Gas Pistols: Air Mag M50 (Modeled after Micro Uzi), Air Mag P50, Crosman Air Mag C11 (Modeled after Beretta 9000s)
- Sub-Machine Guns: Pulse M70, Stinger R36 (Modeled after H&K UMP) Pulse R74 (Modeled after H&K MP5), Pulse R75 (Modeled after the American 180)
- Nightstalker

Crosman has manufactured and sold the Benjamin-Sheridan and Sheridan model airguns for many years. These models are still made to the higher quality standards of the originals, with wood stocks and primarily brass and steel components. The Sheridan line is strictly 5 mm (.20 caliber), while the Benjamin-Sheridan models are available in .177 (4.5 mm, .22 (5.56 mm), .25 (6.4 mm) and .357 (9.0 mm) calibers, depending on model.

== Discontinued models ==
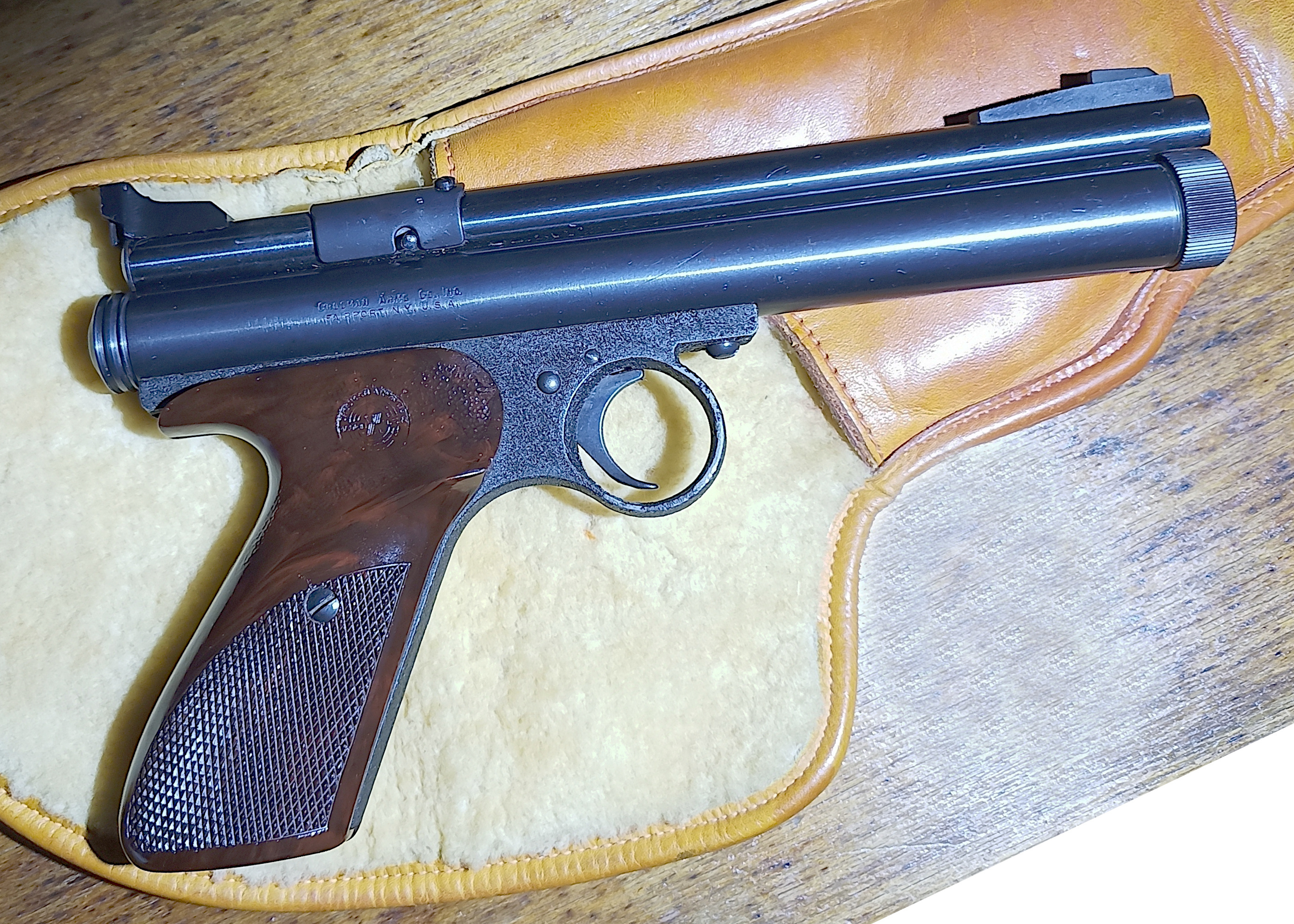
Crosman Model 150 CO_{2} Pistol

=== Air pistols ===
==== Pump pneumatics ====
- Crosman 130
- Crosman 1300 Medalist II

==== Bulk CO_{2} ====
- Crosman 111
- Crosman 112
- Crosman 115
- Crosman 116

==== 12 gram CO_{2} Cartridge ====
- Crosman 150
- Crosman Mark I
- Crosman 600 semi-automatic
