= Crosman 1322 =

Crosman 1322 Medalist
- Crosman 1322 Air Pistol
- Type: Air pistol
- Place of origin: United States

Production history
- Manufacturer: Crosman Corporation
- Unit cost: US$60±
- Produced: 1977 to 2004
- Variants: Crosman 1377

Specifications
- Mass: 2 lb. 7 oz. (1.11 kg)
- Length: 13.63" (34.6cm)
- Cartridge: Lead Pellet
- Caliber: .22 (5.5 mm)
- Action: Bolt Action, pneumatic pump
- Rate of fire: Single Shot
- Muzzle velocity: up to 460 feet per second (140 m/s)
- Effective firing range: 25 meters
- Sights: Open

The Crosman model 1322 Medalist .22 Caliber Pellet Air Pistol is a single-shot, bolt-action loading, pneumatic pump-action .22-caliber air pistol, featuring a button-rifled 10.1-in. (256 mm) steel barrel and checkered plastic grips. The 1322 was introduced in 1977 by Crosman as a general-purpose air pistol for target practice and small game hunting. It was in production, in three separate manufacturing versions, until 2004 when it was discontinued. However, in 2012 the gun was reintroduced by Crosman and remains in production.

== Design and Operation ==
The Model 1322 is a pneumatic pump-action air pistol utilizing .22 (5.5 mm) caliber lead pellets. The pistol's integral pump lever mechanism is located underneath the barrel, integral to the forearm. This pump lever is cycled a variable number of times (up to a maximum of ten strokes) to store increasingly pressurized air in a chamber. When the trigger is activated, an air valve dumps the pressurized air into a transfer port integral to the breech, discharging the pellet from the barrel. According to the manufacturer, a maximum velocity of up to 440 ft/s (130 m/s) was achievable with ten pump strokes, using standard 14.3-grain .22 pellets. The Model 1322 features fully adjustable square notch rear and front fixed blade sights.

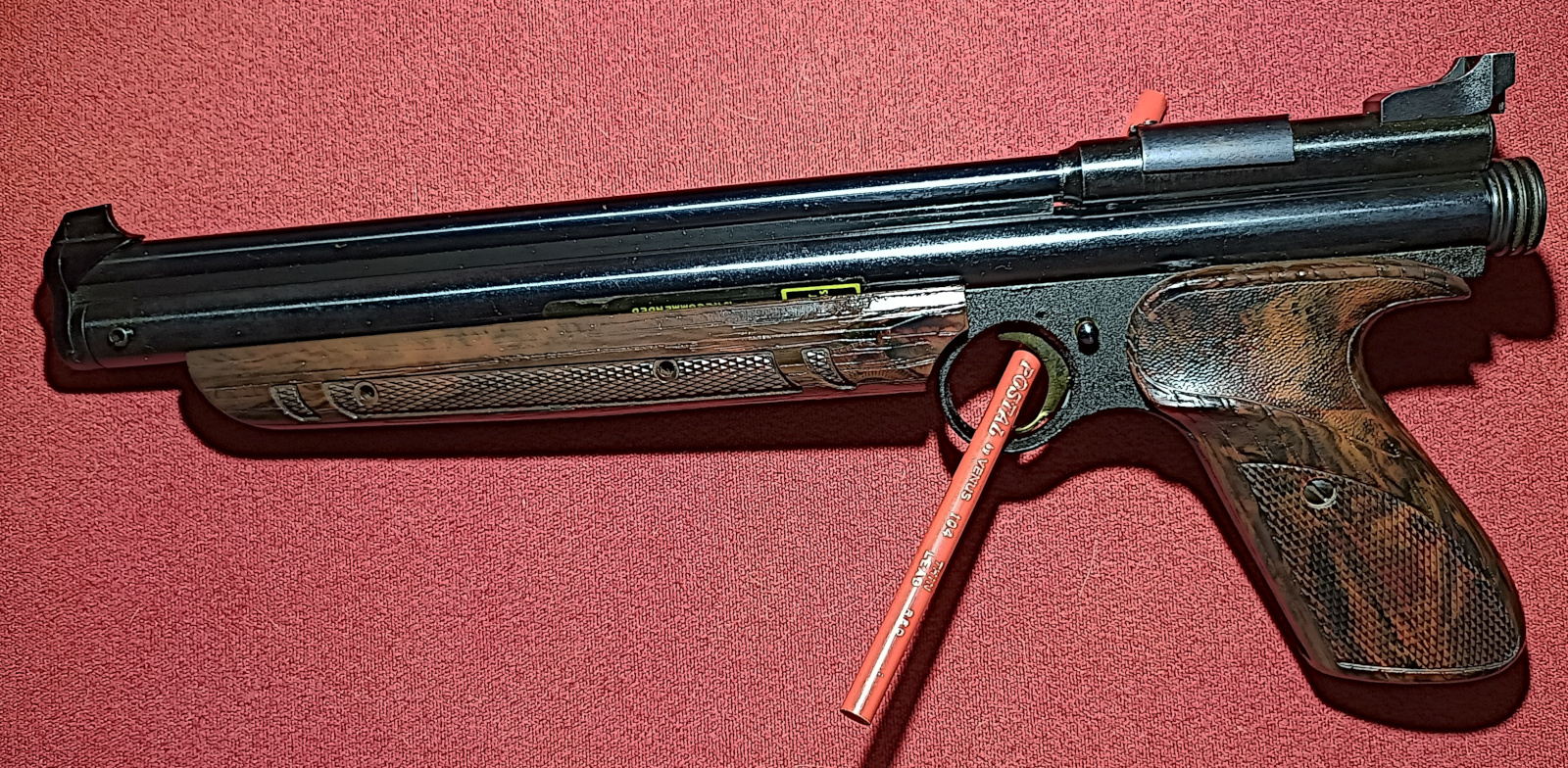
Crosman 1322 Medalist Variation 1

The Model 1322 was the fourth generation Crosman multi-pump pneumatic pistol. The Model 1322 was first introduced in 1977, and was produced over its lifetime in three distinct variants: Type I, 1977–81, Type II, made from 1978 to 1996, and Type III, 1998–2004. Type I featured a sliding metal breech cover, manual cocking using a three-ring external cocking knob, and a steel breech. The Type II adopted a plastic breech in place of the original steel version. The Type III dropped the external cocking knob and breech cover of prior types in favor of a brass bolt action mechanism that integrated loading and cocking functions.

While the Model 1322 was not designed as a competition-level target airgun, its long rifled barrel makes the Model 1322 surprisingly accurate for a mass-produced air pistol. Its accuracy can be further enhanced with precision sights and other modifications.

== Accessories and options ==
In 1981, a composite skeletonized shoulder stock (Model 1399) was introduced as a factory option by Crosman, converting the pistol into a carbine. In 1985, Crosman began offering a pistol scope and mount to fit the Models 1322 and 1377.

The Model 1322 is noted for its versatility and ease of modification. Many factory and aftermarket parts are available for the 1322, including match-grade or custom-length barrels, steel breeches (receivers) suited for mounting optical sights, wide triggers, barrel- and receiver-mounted scope rings, custom and high-output air valves, wood and composite grips and stocks, and other components.

Crosman reintroduced the Model 1322 with black grips in January 2012.

== See also ==
- Crosman
- Crosman Nightstalker
