= Benjamin Rogue =

- Type: Pre-Charged Pneumatic Rifle
- Place of origin: United States

Production history
- Manufacturer: Crosman Corporation
- Unit cost: $1,350.00 USD (in 2013)

Specifications
- Mass: 4.3 kg (9.48 lb)
- Length: 1,250 mm (49 in) stock extended / 1,150 mm (45.3 in) stock folded
- Barrel length: 635 mm (25.0 in)
- Cartridge: Benjamin Persuit or Nosler eXTREME
- Action: Pre-Charged Pneumatic
- Muzzle velocity: 262 m/s (860 ft/s)
- Feed system: 6-shot rotatory clip
- Sights: Several Picattiny rails for accessories

The Benjamin Rogue .357 is a 9mm (0.357") caliber PCP air rifle, making it a large caliber. Produced by Benjamin, a brand owned by Crosman, this rifle produces over 285 joules of impact energy, making it more powerful than a .22 LR or even more powerful than a .380 ACP.

== Design ==
The Rogue, despite not having its own sights, has a 9.5mm top rail behind the 6-shot clip for a scope or SLR, it also has a bottom rail with two slots (one per accessory) to hold a bipod, laser or light.

It uses a 330 cc air tank that can be filled to 3,050 psi (210 bar). For optimal air efficiency, the Rogue features the "Epic Display," a factory-installed electronic device that manages the rifle's power. Three bullet weight options (light, medium, and heavy) and three power options (low, medium, and high) can be selected, combining them to the shooter's liking. The electronically adjustable trigger can be adjusted from the Display Epic. It weighs 4.3 kg, has a barrel length of 25 inches, an overall length of 49 inches with the stock extended and 45 inches with the stock retracted.

The Rogue has a 6-shot clip on top and is essentially semi-automatic, with a range of 4 to 20 shots at full pressure. It has a jacketed barrel that suppresses muzzle noise, making it even quieter than any other firearm, producing around 80 dB. This rifle also has zero recoil. The Rogue also features an adjustable stock for shooter comfort. The Rogue's air tank can be refilled with a hand-operated PCP pump or a high-pressure Benjamin air tank.

=== Ballistics ===
The Crosman Corporation manufactured five different rounds for use in the Rogue.

Pellet	Weight	Velocity	Impact energy
Benjamin Persuit Hollow Point Bullet	95 gr (6.15 g)	860 fps (262 m/s)	155.9 ft-lb (211.3 J)
Benjamin Persuit Flat Nose Bullet	127 gr (8.23 g)	830 fps (253 m/s)	194.1 ft-lb (263.1 J)
Benjamin persuit Hollow Point Bullet	158 gr (10.24 g)	760 fps (231 m/s)	202.4 ft-lb (274.4 J)
Benjamin Persuit Flat Nosed Bullet	170 gr (11 g)	800 fps (244 m/s)	241 ft-lb (328 J)
Benjamin by Nosler eXTREME Ballistic Tip	145 gr (9.4 g)	810 fps (247 m/s)	211 ft-lb (286 J)
