= Crosman 2100 Classic =

Crosman 2100
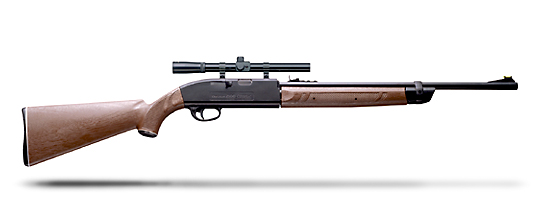
- Type: Pneumatic Air Rifle
- Place of origin: United States

Production history
- Manufacturer: Crosman
- Unit cost: USD85.00±

Specifications
- Mass: 2 lbs 13 oz. (2.18 kg)
- Length: 39.75" (101 cm)
- Cartridge: Steel BB's, Lead pellets
- Caliber: .177" (4.5 mm)
- Barrels: One
- Action: Bolt Action, Pneumatic Pump
- Muzzle velocity: BB: Up to 755 fps (230.2 m/s), Pellet: Up to 725 fps (221.1 m/s)
- Feed system: 17-Round Spring-Loaded BB Repeater Magazine
- Sights: Visible Impact Sight Front: Fixed blade, Fiber optic Rear: Fully Adjustable

The Crosman 2100B (Crosman 2100 Classic) is an American-made pneumatic air gun that is manufactured for small game hunting, large and small pest control, and target shooting.

== Design overview ==
The 2100 Classic is manufactured with adjustable iron sights, but the 2100 Classic also has a dovetail rail for fitting a scope onto the gun. The materials are very basic:

Barrel: Rifled Steel

Stock: Synthetic

Forearm: Synthetic

Muzzle velocity:

- pellet: 725 fps
- BB: 755 fps

Also, for loading the magazine, there is a 17-shot magazine and a 200-round-capacity reservoir in the stock for BBs. Pellets are single shot only.

== Operation ==
Like most air rifles, the 2100 has only one safety, located behind the trigger, but the 2100 also comes with a plastic trigger block to put behind the trigger when not in use, and is only operated by an included special key. To put the gun into a fire-ready mode, the operator must work the action fully open, whether or not a round will be fired, and then close the action fully. Before or after working the action, the operator has to work the air pump at least once to shoot the round, but like most multi-stroke pneumatic air rifles, three pumps is usually the minimum for firing a powerful round, depending on the distance the round is being fired. And most importantly, the safety must be OFF to fire.

=== Loading ===
In order to load the 2100, the Repeater Magazine spring must be pulled back and locked into its notch to keep it in place, and then, after loading the BB reservoir, shaking the rifle up and down or in a twisting motion until the magazine is fully loaded, and then snapping the magazine spring back into the normal position. Then, when the action is worked, the magnetic bolt automatically loads a round into the chamber. Working the action multiple times will put more ammunition into the barrel, but they will roll out of it because only the first round is magnetically held in place.

== Legality ==
Even though most American States do not regard BB guns as firearms, some states' definition of firearms (i.e. Michigan) is misleading. Though they may consider .177 caliber spring, gas, or air BB guns not to be firearms, the usual definition is only limited to smooth-bore BB guns, so one should be careful handling BB guns openly as many airguns look very similar to actual weapons and can be mistaken as such by the police.

== See also ==
- Crosman
- Crosman Nightstalker
