= Crosman Pumpmaster 760 =

Crosman Pumpmaster 760, Crosman 760 Pumpmaster
- Type: (Variable) Multi-Pump Pneumatic Air Rifle
- Place of origin: United States

Production history
- Designer: Crosman
- Designed: 1964
- Manufacturer: Crosman
- Unit cost: USD 25.00± - 39.99±
- No. built: over 16,000,000 sold
- Variants: 760B (Black), 760P (Pink), 760SB (Silver barrel), 760XLS, 760 Powermaster

Specifications
- Mass: 2 lb 12 oz (1.2 kg)
- Length: 33.5 in (850 mm)
- Cartridge: Steel BB's, Lead pellets
- Caliber: .177" (4.5 mm)
- Barrels: One
- Action: Bolt Action, Pneumatic Pump
- Muzzle velocity: BB: Up to 700 ft/s (210 m/s), Pellet: Up to 645 ft/s (197 m/s) with 10 pumps
- Feed system: 5 shot pellet clip, 18 BB magazine (200 BB reservoir)
- Sights: Front: Fiber optic (fixed); Rear: Notch Sight, Adjustable for elevation

The Crosman Pumpmaster 760, or Crosman 760 Pumpmaster, is an American-made multi-pump pneumatic air gun that is manufactured for target shooting, plinking, and small pest control. The Crosman 760 Pumpmaster is a BB gun with more than 16 million copies sold. It has a caliber of .177 and can shoot up to 645 fps for BBs and 615 for Pellets. Pellets are loaded into a 5-shot clip, while BBs have an 18-shot magazine, which is fed from the 200-shot reservoir. It comes standard with a fiber optic front sight, but can accommodate a scope on the 3/8 inch (9.5 mm) dovetail rail on top of the receiver. The rear sight is a notch sight and is adjustable for elevation using a 5-rail elevator piece.

== Hunting ==
This gun may be used for hunting small pests, up to small game. The latest 760 Pumpmaster is not rifled, thus inconsistently accurate and can hit a target at ranges of up to 20 yards. Propelling a pellet at 600 feet per second (180 m/s), this gun is able to effectively dispatch small game such as rat or starling at ranges of up to 10-15 yards if you can hit them at the right place.
