= Miles per hour =

Unit of speed

miles per hour
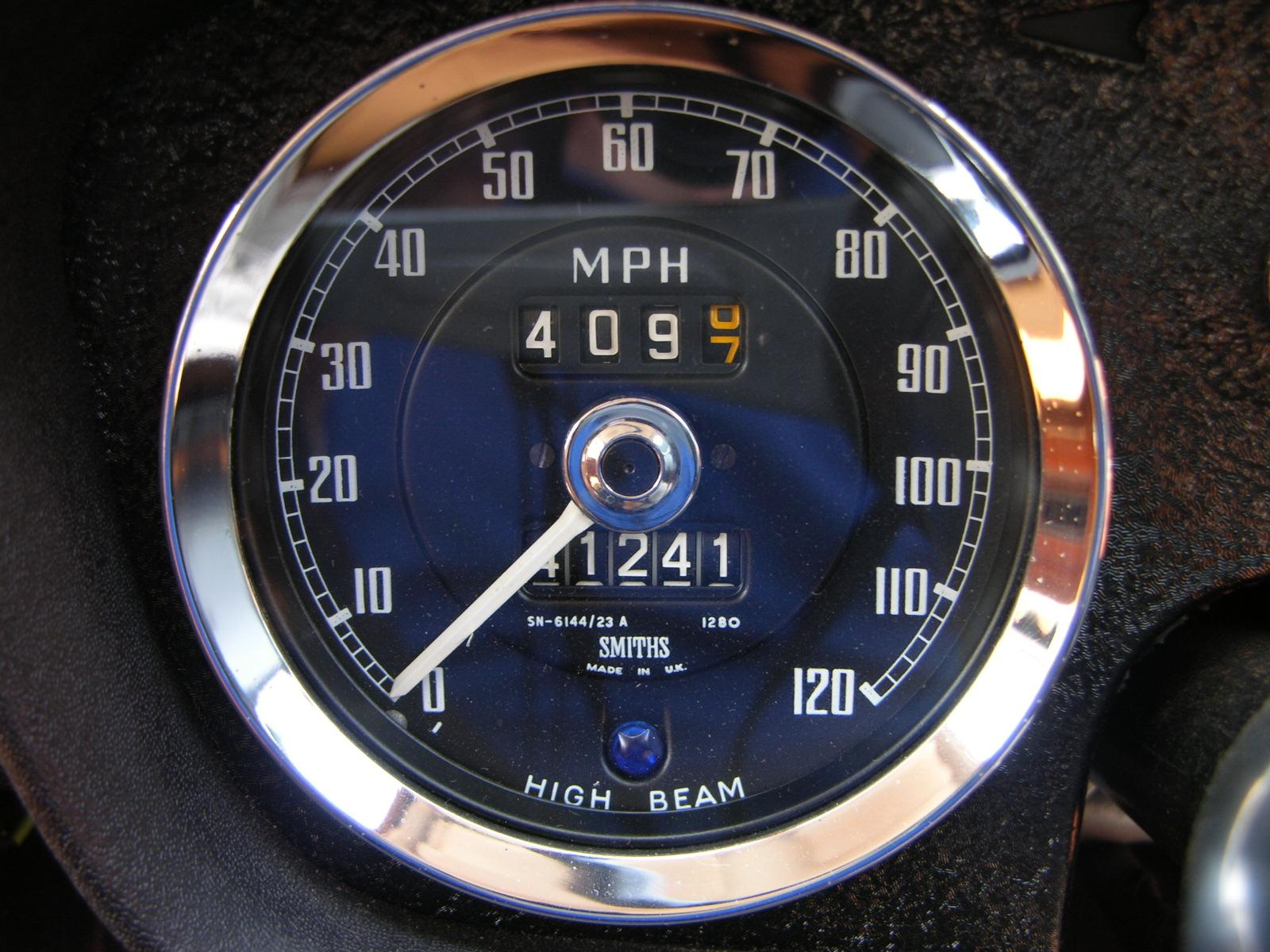
- Speedometer, indicating speed in miles per hour

General information
- Unit system: Imperial, United States customary units
- Unit of: speed
- Symbol: mph, mi/h

Conversions
1 mph, mi/h in ...	... is equal to ...
- km/h: 1.609344
- m/s: 0.44704
- ft/s: 1.467
- kn: 0.869

Miles per hour (mph, m.p.h., MPH, or mi/h) is a British imperial and United States customary unit of speed expressing the number of miles travelled in one hour. It is used in the United Kingdom, the United States, and a number of smaller countries, most of which are UK or US territories, or have close historical ties with the UK or US.

== Usage ==
Speed limit units on traffic signs around the world: Kilometres per hour (km/h) Miles per hour (mph) Both No speed limit units

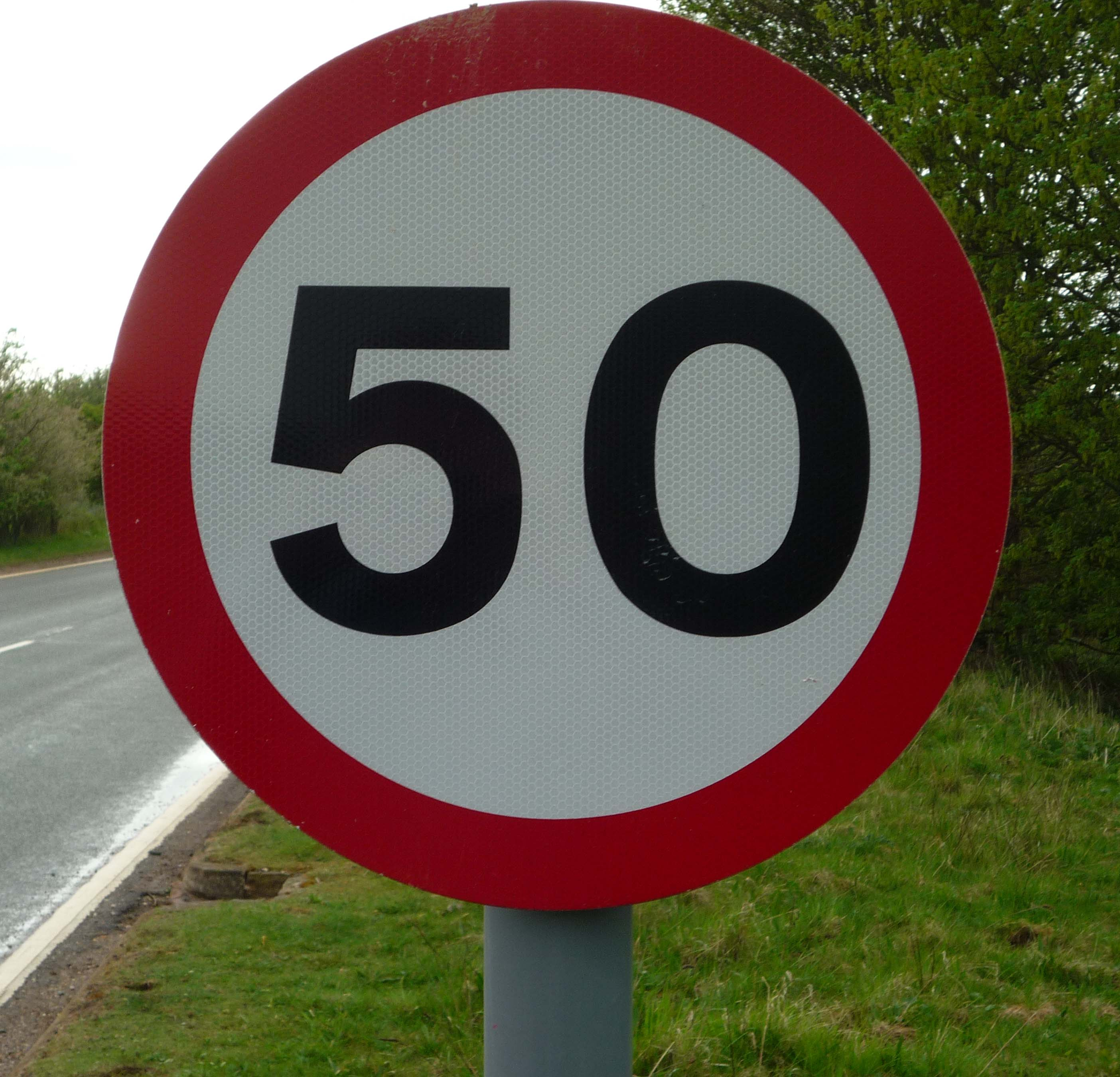
50 mph speed limit sign in the United Kingdom

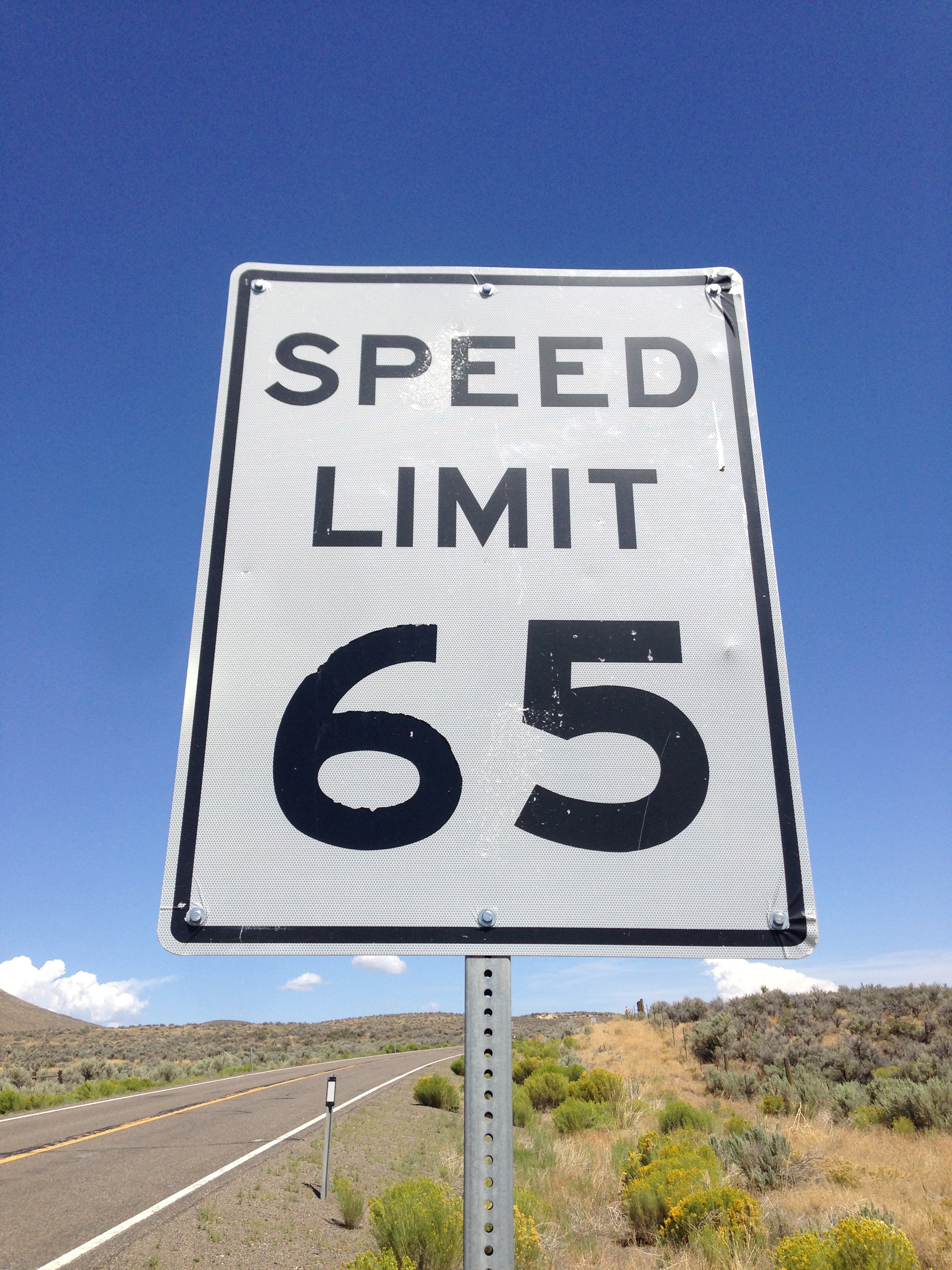
65 mph speed limit sign in the United States

=== Road traffic ===
Speed limits and road traffic speeds are given in miles per hour in the following jurisdictions:

- Antigua and Barbuda
- Bahamas
- Belize
- Dominica
- Grenada
- Liberia (occasionally) (Note: Some signs are explicitly labeled in miles per hour, but most are either explicitly or implicitly measured in kilometers per hour.)
- Marshall Islands
- Micronesia
- Palau
- Saint Kitts and Nevis
- Saint Lucia
- Saint Vincent and the Grenadines
- United Kingdom
- The following British Overseas Territories:
  - Anguilla
  - British Virgin Islands
  - British Indian Ocean Territory
  - Cayman Islands
  - Falkland Islands
  - Montserrat
  - Saint Helena, Ascension and Tristan da Cunha
  - Turks and Caicos Islands
- The Crown dependencies:
  - Bailiwick of Guernsey
  - Isle of Man
  - Jersey
- United States
- The following United States overseas dependencies:
  - American Samoa
  - Guam
  - Northern Mariana Islands
  - Puerto Rico
  - United States Virgin Islands

=== Rail networks ===
Miles per hour is the unit used on the US, Canadian and Irish rail systems. Miles per hour is also used on British rail systems, excluding trams, some light metro systems, the Channel Tunnel and High Speed 1.

=== Nautical and aeronautical usage ===
Nautical and aeronautical applications favour the knot as a common unit of speed. (One knot is one nautical mile per hour, with a nautical mile being exactly 1,852 metres or about 6,076 feet.)

=== Other usage ===
In some countries mph may be used to express the speed of delivery of a ball in sporting events such as cricket, tennis and baseball.

== Conversions ==
1 mph	= 0.44704 m/s (exactly)
1 mph	= 1.609344 km/h (exactly)

Conversions between common units of speed
	m/s	km/h	mph (mi/h)	knot	fps (ft/s)
1 m/s =	1	3.600000	2.236936*	1.943844*	3.280840*
1 km/h =	0.277778*	1	0.621371*	0.539957*	0.911344*
1 mph (mi/h) =	0.44704	1.609344	1	0.868976*	1.466667*
1 knot =	0.514444*	1.852	1.150779*	1	1.687810*
1 fps (ft/s) =	0.3048	1.09728	0.681818*	0.592484*	1

(* = approximate values)

== See also ==
- Acceleration
- Kilometres per hour
- Velocity
