= Crosman Stinger P9 =

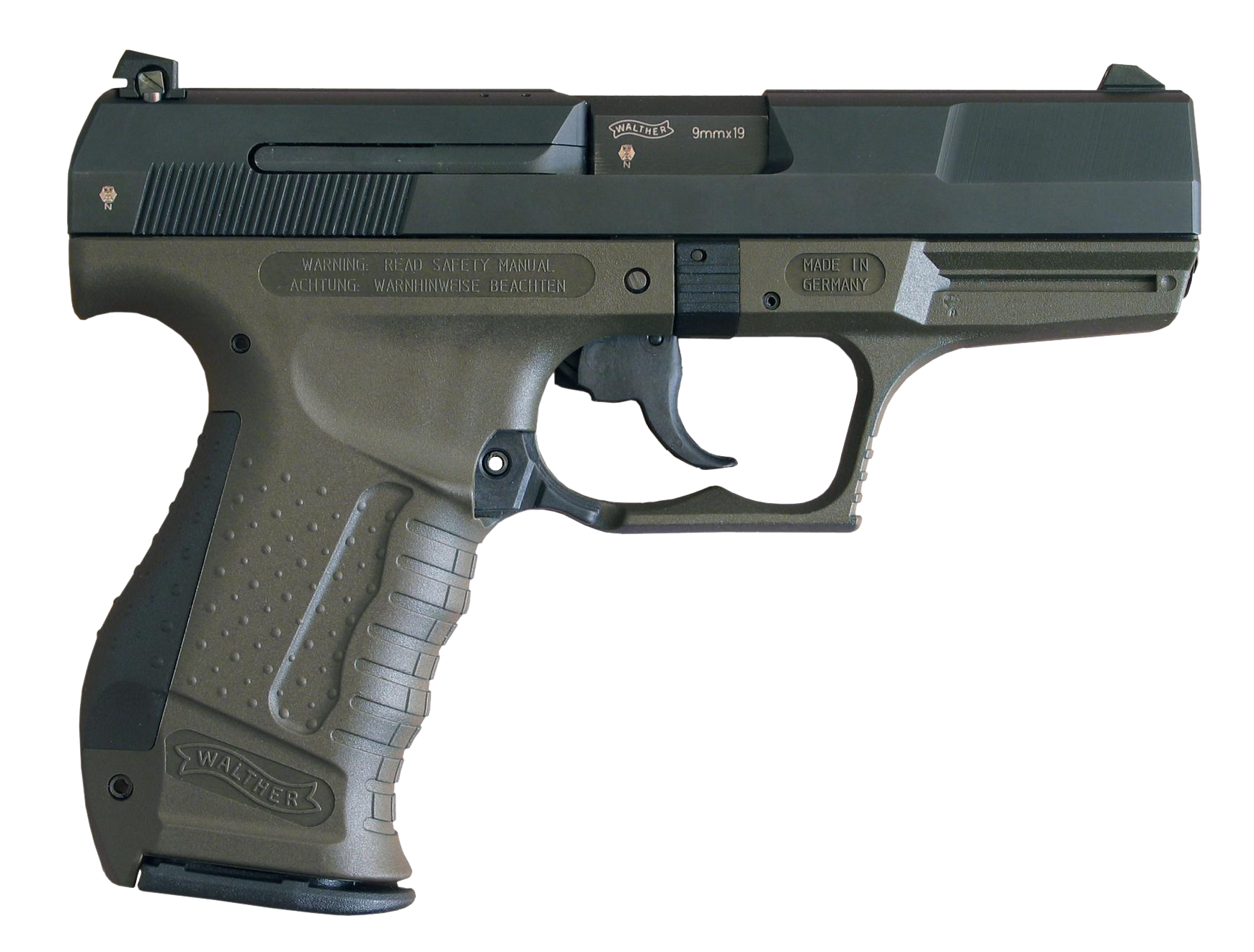
- The Walther P99, which the Stinger P9 was modeled after.
- Type: Repeater; fully automatic
- Place of origin: United States

Production history
- Manufacturer: Crosman
- Unit cost: US$19.00± - 25.50±
- Variants: P9T

Specifications
- Mass: 0.63 lbs
- Length: 7.13"
- Cartridge: Plastic BBs
- Caliber: 6mm BB
- Barrels: One
- Action: Fully automatic, Manual Cocking
- Muzzle velocity: BB: Up to 275 ft/s
- Feed system: 14 round(s) magazine, No reservoir
- Sights: Front: Blade Rear: Fixed

The P9T Pistol is a cock-and-shoot spring airsoft pistol manufactured by Crosman Airguns. It shoots at velocities up to 275 fps with 0.12 gram BBs. and includes a 15-round magazine, hop-up propulsion system and an under barrel Weaver rail. It is sold with a holster made from soft cordura fabric and features a Velcro thumb break. Also included in the kit is a trial package of .12g airsoft BBs.

== Specifications ==
- Authentic 1:1 scale replica of Walther P99
- Fully licensed Walther trademarks (made by Crosman)
- Weight: 0.65 lb (0.29 kg)
- Overall length: 7 in (180 mm)
- Capacity: 14 round(s)
  - 14-rd magazine
  - 100-rd reservoir
- Front Sight: Blade and ramp
- Rear Sight: Notch
- Scopeable: NO
- Powerplant: Spring-piston
- Hop-Up: Yes, Fixed
- Ammo: 6mm airsoft BB's, .12g BB's suggested
- Body: Pistol
- Color: Black, Two tone Black and Clear, Brown and Black
- Safety : Lever
- Action: Repeater, Spring
- Package: Plastic clam form
- Orange muzzle to comply with federal regulations
