= Steve Richmond =

American ice hockey player (born 1959)

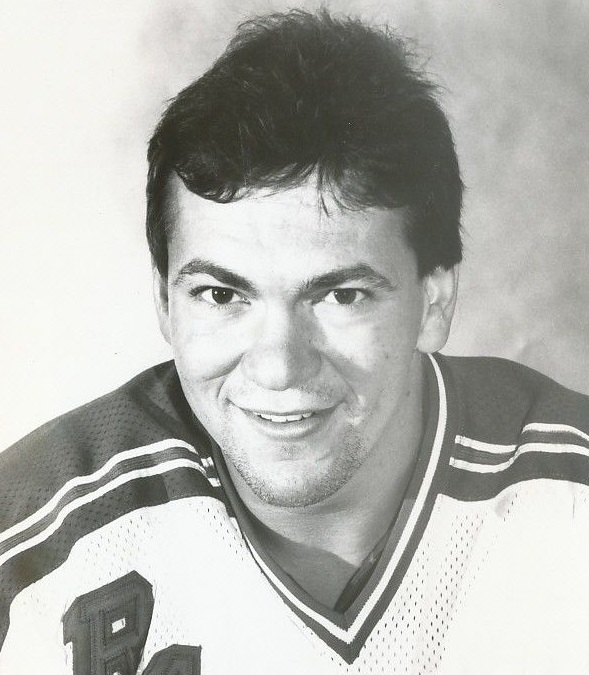
- Richmond in 1984
- Born: December 11, 1959 (age 66) Chicago, Illinois, U.S.
- Height: 6 ft 1 in (185 cm)
- Weight: 205 lb (93 kg; 14 st 9 lb)
- Position: Defense
- Shot: Left
- Played for: New York Rangers; Detroit Red Wings; New Jersey Devils; Los Angeles Kings
- Playing career: 1982–1991

Steven L. Richmond (born December 11, 1959) is an American former professional ice hockey player. He played 159 games in the National Hockey League with four teams between 1984 and 1989.

== Amateur career ==
Richmond grew up playing hockey in Chicago where he attended Evanston High School. He also played two years of Junior hockey in Pickering, Ontario. He finished his amateur career playing for the University of Michigan, where he holds the record for most goals by a defenseman with 40.

== Professional career ==
Signed as a free agent by the New York Rangers in 1982, Richmond ended up playing 159 games in the National Hockey League with the New York Rangers, Detroit Red Wings, New Jersey Devils, and Los Angeles Kings. He was also a member of the Tulsa Oilers of the Central Hockey League (CHL) that suspended operations on February 16, 1984, playing only road games for the final six weeks of 1983–84 season. Despite this adversity, the team went on to win the league championship.

== Post career ==
Richmond is currently the director of player development of the Washington Capitals. His son Danny Richmond is also a professional ice hockey player.

== Career statistics ==
=== Regular season and playoffs ===
			Regular season					Playoffs
Season	Team	League	GP	G	A	Pts	PIM	GP	G	A	Pts	PIM
1977–78	Evanston Township High School	HSIL	—	—	—	—	—	—	—	—	—	—
1978–79	University of Michigan	WCHA	24	2	5	7	38	—	—	—	—	—
1979–80	University of Michigan	WCHA	38	10	19	29	26	—	—	—	—	—
1980–81	University of Michigan	WCHA	39	22	32	54	46	—	—	—	—	—
1981–82	University of Michigan	WCHA	38	6	30	36	68	—	—	—	—	—
1982–83	Tulsa Oilers	CHL	78	5	13	18	187	—	—	—	—	—
1983–84	New York Rangers	NHL	26	2	5	7	110	4	0	0	0	12
1983–84	Tulsa Oilers	CHL	38	1	17	18	114	—	—	—	—	—
1984–85	New York Rangers	NHL	34	0	5	5	90	—	—	—	—	—
1984–85	New Haven Nighthawks	AHL	37	3	10	13	122	—	—	—	—	—
1985–86	New York Rangers	NHL	17	0	2	2	63	—	—	—	—	—
1985–86	New Haven Nighthawks	AHL	11	2	6	8	32	—	—	—	—	—
1985–86	Detroit Red Wings	NHL	29	1	2	3	82	—	—	—	—	—
1985–86	Adirondack Red Wings	AHL	20	1	7	8	23	17	2	9	11	34
1986–87	New Jersey Devils	NHL	44	1	7	8	143	—	—	—	—	—
1987–88	Utica Devils	AHL	79	6	27	33	141	—	—	—	—	—
1987–88	Flint Spirits	IHL	2	0	2	2	2	16	2	9	11	57
1988–89	New Haven Nighthawks	AHL	49	6	35	41	114	17	3	10	13	84
1989–90	Los Angeles Kings	NHL	9	0	2	2	26	—	—	—	—	—
1989–90	Flint Spirits	IHL	10	1	3	4	19	4	0	1	1	16
1990–91	San Diego Gulls	IHL	12	3	7	10	19	—	—	—	—	—
AHL totals			196	18	85	103	432	34	5	19	24	118
NHL totals			159	4	23	27	514	4	0	0	0	12

== Awards ==
- Stanley Cup champion – 2018
- Adams Cup champion – 1984

Award	Year
All-CCHA Second Team	1981-82
