= Weatherby Award =

Lifetime achievement award in the field of hunting and conservation

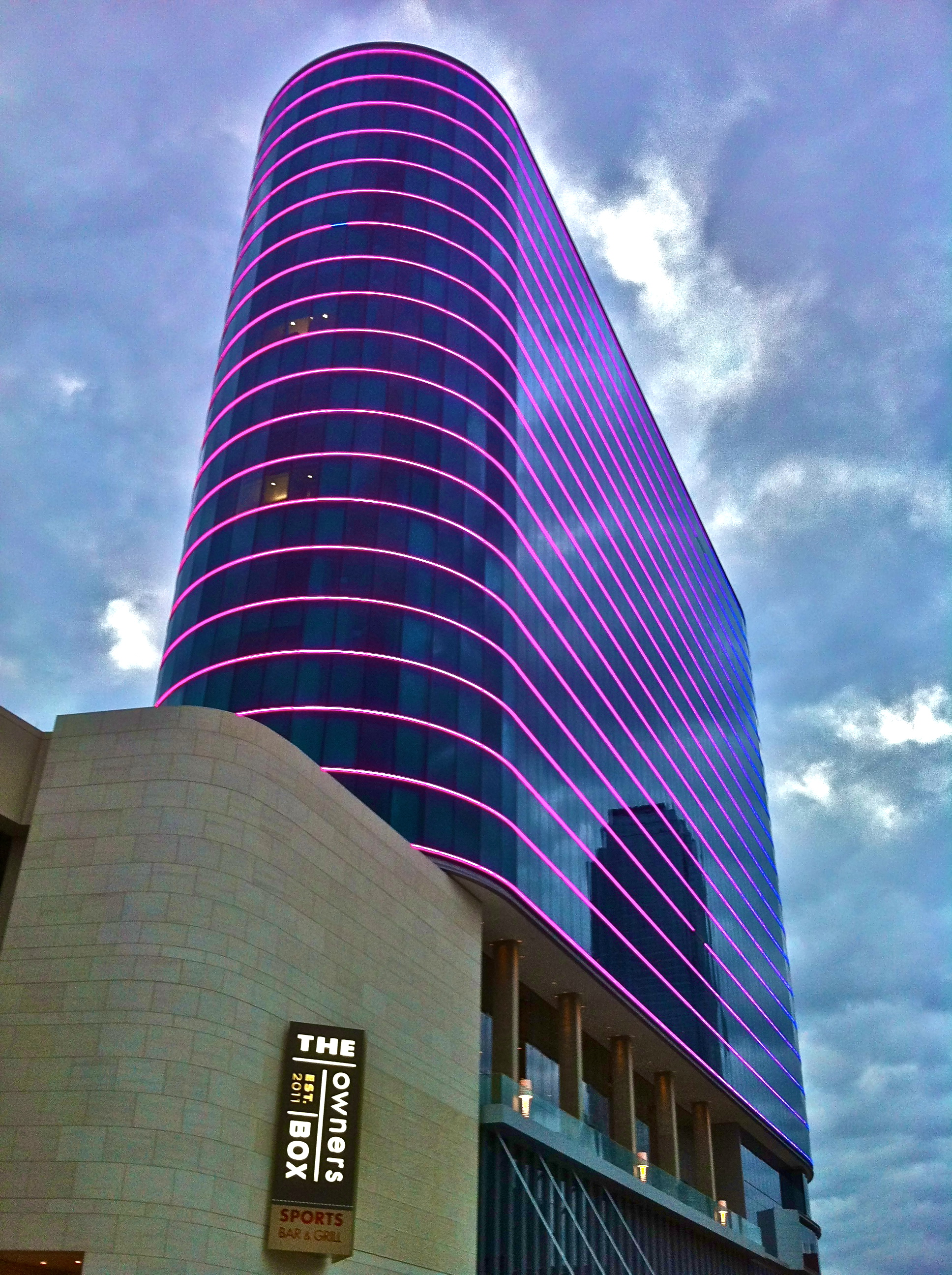
- View of Omni Dallas Hotel, where the prize is awarded annually
- Location: 7834 S. Lakeshore Drive; Tempe; Arizona
- Country: United States
- Presented by: Weatherby Foundation International
- First award: 1956
- Currently held by: (Russia) Alexander Egorov
- Website: Official website

The Weatherby Award is awarded annually for remarkable lifetime achievements in the field of hunting and conservation. It is considered "the Nobel Prize equivalent in hunting and conservationism" and the pinnacle to a long, successful hunting career. Although it was first awarded in 1956, the Weatherby Foundation International was only established in 1988 to honour the deceased Roy Weatherby, founder of the eponymous gun manufacturer, Weatherby, Inc. The Foundation’s mission statement is “to educate youth and the non-hunting public on the beneficial role of ethical sport hunting and its contribution to wildlife conservation, and to protect our constitutional right to do so”.

== Laureates ==
The list of winners is available at the official Weatherby Foundation website.

Year	Winner	Country	Nominees	Comments
1956	Herb W. Klein	United States	Unknown	
1957	Jack O'Connor	United States	Don Hopkins, Myles Brown, Col T. Whelen, Robert Taylor, Jack Roach.	
1958	Warren Page	United States	Julio Estrada, Berry Brooks	
1959	Berry B. Brooks	United States	Julio Estrada	
1960	Elgin T. Gates	United States	Bobby Burns, George Parker, Lloyd Zeug, HIH Prince Abdorreza, Julio E. Estrada, Dr. Frank Hibben, John B. Lagarde	
1961	Julio E. Estrada	Mexico	HIH Prince Abdorreza, Dr. Frank Hibben, John B. Lagarde	
1962	H.I.H Abdul Reza Pahlavi	Iran	Dr. Frank Hibben, John B. Lagarde, Lloyd Zeug, Bobby Burns, George Parker, William A. Fisher.	
1963	John B. Lagarde	United States	Dr. Frank Hibben, Lloyd Zeug, Francois Edmond-Blanc, George Parker, William A. Fisher, Weir McDonald, W. Brandon Macomber.	
1964	Dr. Frank C. Hibben	United States		
1965	François Edmond-Blanc	France		
1966	Dr. W. Brandon Macomber	United States		
1967	Dan W. Maddox	United States		
1968	Weir McDonald	United States		
1969	C.J. McElroy	United States		
1970	George H. Landreth	United States		
1971	Juan Naude Cordova	Mexico		
1972	James R. Mellon II	United States		
1973	Basil C. Bradbury	United States		
1974	Dr. Kenneth W. Vaughn	United States		
1975	No award			
1976	Rudolf Sand	Denmark		
1977	Valentín de Madariaga y Oya	Spain		
1978	Arthur W. Carlsberg	United States		
1979	Dr. Robert E. Speegle	United States		
1980	Watson T. Yoshimoto	United States		
1981	Dr. Carlo Caldesi Biella	Italy		
1982	Glenn Slade	United States		
1983	Mahlon T. White	United States		
1984	Jacques Henrijean	Belgium		
1985	Thornton Snider	United States		
1986	Héctor Cuéllar	Mexico		
1987	Dr. James E. Conklin	United States		
1988	No award			
1989	Donald G. Cox	United States		
1990	Robert K. Chisholm	United States		
1991	Gary R. Ingersoll	United States		
1992	Hubert Thummler	Mexico		
1993	L. Irvin Barnhart	United States		
1994	Dr. Gerald L. Warnock	United States		
1995	Jesús Yuren	Mexico		
1996	Arnold E. Alward	Canada		
1997	Ricardo Medem Sanjuán	Spain		
1998	Dan L. Duncan	United States		
1999	Pete Papac	United States		
2000	Enrique Zamácola Millet	Spain		
2001	Adrián Sada	Mexico		
2002	Rex Baker	United States		
2003	Mike Simpson	United States		
2004	David J. Hanlin	United States		
2005	Jimmie C. Rosenbruch	United States		
2006	Federico Sada	Mexico		
2007	Dr. Larry Rudolph	United States		
2008	Alan Sackman	United States		
2009	Bruce Keller	United States		
2010	Tony Gioffre	United States		
2011	Edward D. Yates	United States		
2012	Thomas J. Hammond	United States		
2013	J. Alain Smith	United States		
2014	Renee Snider	United States		
2015	Barbara Sackman	United States		
2016	Kenneth Barr	United States		
2017	Craig Boddington	United States	Larry Higgins, Malcom King, José Madrazo Ambrosio, Eduardo Negrete, Doug Yajko.	
2018	Jim Shockey	Canada	Alexander Egorov, Larry Higgins, Malcom King, Jay Link, José Madrazo Ambrosio.	
2019	José Madrazo Ambrosio	Spain	Alexander Egorov, Béla Hidvégi, Jay Link, Eduardo Negrete, Doug Yajko.	
2020	Alexander Egorov	Russia	Brad Black, Béla Hidvégi, Jay Link, Eduardo Negrete, Doug Yajko.	
2021	No award			
2022	Dr. Bradford Black	United States	Jeff Demaske, Béla Hidvégi, Jay Link, Doug Yajko.	
2023	Béla Hidvégi	Hungary	Lee Anderson, Jan Dams, Jay Link, Eduardo Negrete, Doug Yajko	

== Laureates per country ==
The following table shows the number of laureates per country:

Rank	Country	Laureates
1	United States	46
2	Mexico	7
3	Spain	4
4	Canada	2
5	Iran	1
6	France	1
7	Denmark	1
8	Italy	1
9	Belgium	1
10	Russia	1
11	Hungary	1
	Total	66

== See also ==
- Weatherby, Inc.
- List of big-game hunters
- Vokins, N. (2004). The Weatherby. Long Beach: Safari Press. pp. 413–419. ISBN 1-57157-189-2.
