= Tim Brent =

Canadian ice hockey player (born 1984)

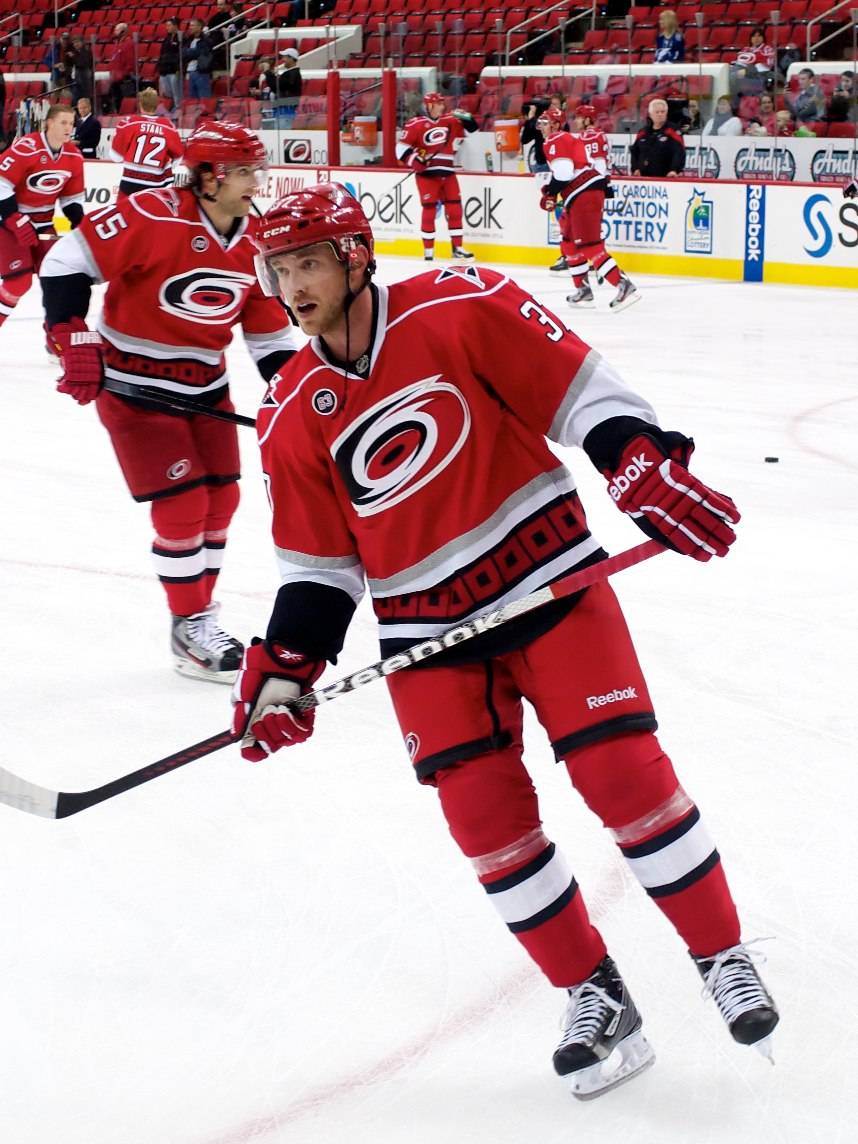
- Born: March 10, 1984 (age 42) Cambridge, Ontario, Canada
- Height: 6 ft 0 in (183 cm)
- Weight: 195 lb (88 kg; 13 st 13 lb)
- Position: Centre
- Shot: Right
- Played for: Anaheim Ducks; Pittsburgh Penguins; Chicago Blackhawks; Toronto Maple Leafs; Carolina Hurricanes; Torpedo Nizhny Novgorod; Metallurg Magnitogorsk; Cambridge Winterhawks; Hespeler Shamrocks; Cambridge Hawks AAA
- NHL draft: 37th overall, 2002; Mighty Ducks of Anaheim; 75th overall, 2004; Mighty Ducks of Anaheim
- Playing career: 2004–2016

Tim Brent (born March 10, 1984) is a Canadian former professional ice hockey forward who played over 200 games in the National Hockey League (NHL), most notably for the Toronto Maple Leafs and Carolina Hurricanes.

== Playing career ==
=== Junior hockey ===
Brent grew up in the Cambridge, Ontario, area playing minor ice hockey for the Hespeler Shamrocks of the OMHA and the Cambridge Hawks of the Alliance Pavilion League. He played in the 1998 Quebec International Pee-Wee Hockey Tournament with a team from Cambridge. At age 15, Brent signed with the Cambridge Winterhawks Jr.B. team of the OHA Midwestern Ontario Hockey League in the 1999–2000 season. After completing his Jr.B. season, Brent was the 2nd overall selection of the Ontario Hockey League (OHL)'s Toronto St. Michael's Majors in the 2000 OHL Priority Selection.

Brent began his major junior career on the Toronto St. Michael's Majors of the OHL in the 2000–01 season. He played on the team for four seasons, until 2003–04. During that time, he was drafted twice, both times by Anaheim. He was first drafted 37th overall in the 2002 NHL entry draft, but was re-entered into the draft two years later after not signing with Anaheim. In the 2004 NHL entry draft, he was selected 75th overall, again by the Ducks. After firing his agent, he agreed to a three-year entry-level contract with Anaheim. In 2004, Brent was part of the Canada men's national junior ice hockey team at the 2003 World Junior Championships. He was named an alternate captain prior to the tournament's start. The team lost to the United States in the final game, earning the Canadians the silver medal.

=== Professional hockey ===
In the 2004–05 season, he started his professional career with the Cincinnati Mighty Ducks but was recalled by Anaheim and played 18 games in the NHL that season. The next season, he played on the Portland Pirates, the Ducks' new minor league affiliate. He began his 2006–07 season with Portland, but was recalled to the Ducks and scored his first NHL goal February 20, 2007, against the Vancouver Canucks. The Ducks went on to win the Stanley Cup that year. He was on the Ducks roster when they won the Stanley Cup. Brent received a Stanley Cup ring, but did not play enough games to be included on the Stanley Cup engraving.

On June 23, 2007, the Anaheim Ducks traded Brent to the Pittsburgh Penguins in exchange for centre Stephen Dixon. He played only one game with the Penguins, spending the rest of the season with the Wilkes-Barre/Scranton Penguins, their AHL affiliate reaching the Calder Cup final. On July 17, 2008, Brent was traded to the Chicago Blackhawks in exchange for Danny Richmond. Brent spent most of the 2008–09 season with the Blackhawks' AHL affiliate Rockford IceHogs, but was recalled to Chicago, playing in two games.

On July 6, 2009, Brent signed a one-year contract with the Toronto Maple Leafs. During his first preseason game of the 2009–2010 season, Brent tore his pectoral muscle – requiring surgery that would see him miss four months of action. After recovering, Brent returned to play with the Toronto Marlies, recording 28 points in 33 games. He was called up for the final game of the season to make his debut with the Toronto Maple Leafs versus the Montreal Canadiens. He re-signed with the Leafs that offseason to a one-year two-way contract. A strong training camp with Toronto saw Brent dress for the Maple Leafs in the season opener on October 7, 2010, versus the Montreal Canadiens. Brent immediately made an impact, scoring a goal. With the Leafs, Brent took on a checking center role, playing on the penalty kill unit. During a game on February 3, 2011, against the Carolina Hurricanes, Brent blocked two shots and cleared the puck in a single penalty kill. This play was considered among the Leafs' best of the season. Brent went on to suit up for 79 games that season, registering 8 goals and 20 points while seeing the most time on the Leafs penalty kill.

Brent signed a two-year contract with the Carolina Hurricanes on July 1, 2011. He played 30 games for the Hurricanes, registering just 3 points. Upon completion of his contract with the Hurricanes, Brent signed his first contract outside North America, on a one-year deal with Russian club, Torpedo Nizhny Novgorod of the Kontinental Hockey League on July 30, 2013. After eighteen games with Torpedo, he was traded to Metallurg Magnitogorsk for Justin Hodgman. With Metallurg he won the Gagarin Cup.

Brent returned to North America following the 2014–15 season, signing a one-year, two-way contract with the Philadelphia Flyers on July 1, 2015. He was assigned for the duration of the 2015–16 season to the team's AHL affiliate, the Lehigh Valley Phantoms. In 52 games with the Phantoms, Brent contributed with 10 goals and 28 points before announcing his retirement from professional hockey at season's end on May 25, 2016.

== Personal life ==
Brent is married to Eva Shockey. The couple have two children.

== Career statistics ==
=== Regular season and playoffs ===
			Regular Season					Playoffs
Season	Team	League	GP	G	A	Pts	PIM	GP	G	A	Pts	PIM
1999–2000	Cambridge Winterhawks	MWJHL	40	19	16	35	42	—	—	—	—	—
2000–01	Toronto St. Michael's Majors	OHL	64	9	19	28	31	18	2	8	10	6
2001–02	Toronto St. Michael's Majors	OHL	61	19	40	59	52	14	7	12	19	20
2002–03	Toronto St. Michael's Majors	OHL	60	24	42	66	74	19	7	17	24	14
2003–04	Toronto St. Michael's Majors	OHL	53	26	41	67	105	18	4	13	17	24
2004–05	Cincinnati Mighty Ducks	AHL	46	5	13	18	42	12	0	1	1	6
2005–06	Portland Pirates	AHL	37	15	9	24	32	15	4	4	8	16
2006–07	Portland Pirates	AHL	48	16	14	30	40	—	—	—	—	—
2006–07	Anaheim Ducks	NHL	15	1	0	1	6	—	—	—	—	—
2007–08	Wilkes–Barre/Scranton Penguins	AHL	74	18	43	61	79	23	12	15	27	10
2007–08	Pittsburgh Penguins	NHL	1	0	0	0	0	—	—	—	—	—
2008–09	Rockford IceHogs	AHL	64	20	42	62	59	4	0	1	1	2
2008–09	Chicago Blackhawks	NHL	2	0	0	0	2	—	—	—	—	—
2009–10	Toronto Marlies	AHL	33	13	15	28	19	—	—	—	—	—
2009–10	Toronto Maple Leafs	NHL	1	0	0	0	0	—	—	—	—	—
2010–11	Toronto Maple Leafs	NHL	79	8	12	20	33	—	—	—	—	—
2011–12	Carolina Hurricanes	NHL	79	12	12	24	27	—	—	—	—	—
2012–13	Carolina Hurricanes	NHL	30	0	3	3	8	—	—	—	—	—
2013–14	Torpedo Nizhny Novgorod	KHL	18	3	8	11	16	—	—	—	—	—
2013–14	Metallurg Magnitogorsk	KHL	33	6	12	18	59	20	1	0	1	37
2014–15	Metallurg Magnitogorsk	KHL	42	5	10	15	30	10	1	2	3	8
2015–16	Lehigh Valley Phantoms	AHL	52	10	18	28	39	—	—	—	—	—
AHL totals			354	97	154	251	310	54	16	21	37	34
NHL totals			207	21	27	48	76	—	—	—	—	—
KHL totals			93	14	30	44	105	30	2	2	4	45

=== International ===
Year	Team	Event	GP	G	A	Pts	PIM
2001	Canada Ontario	U17	4	1	1	2	2
2001	Canada	U18	5	2	3	5	13
2004	Canada	WJC	6	1	2	3	4
Junior totals			15	4	6	10	19
