= Sheridan Products =

Former American air gun manufacturing company

Sheridan Products Inc. was an American air gun manufacturing company. It was purchased by the Benjamin Air Rifle Company in 1977, and later purchased by Crosman in 1994.

== Company history ==
Sheridan Products was formed to produce pneumatic air pellet rifles with production beginning in March 1947. In the early 1940s co-founder Ed Wackerhagen, dissatisfied with a pellet gun used by his son, set out to build a better one. It was to be called the Model A, or "Super Grade". This air gun was to fill the gap between the BB gun and the .22 caliber. A successful prototype was produced mid-1944. In 1945, in partnership with I.R. "Bob" Kraus, Sheridan Products Inc. was created in Racine, Wisconsin. The name Sheridan was reputedly in honor of the Civil War's General Philip Sheridan.

Sheridan was purchased by the Benjamin Air Rifle Company in 1977, which was later purchased by Crosman in 1994.
