= Danny Richmond =

American ice hockey player (born 1984)

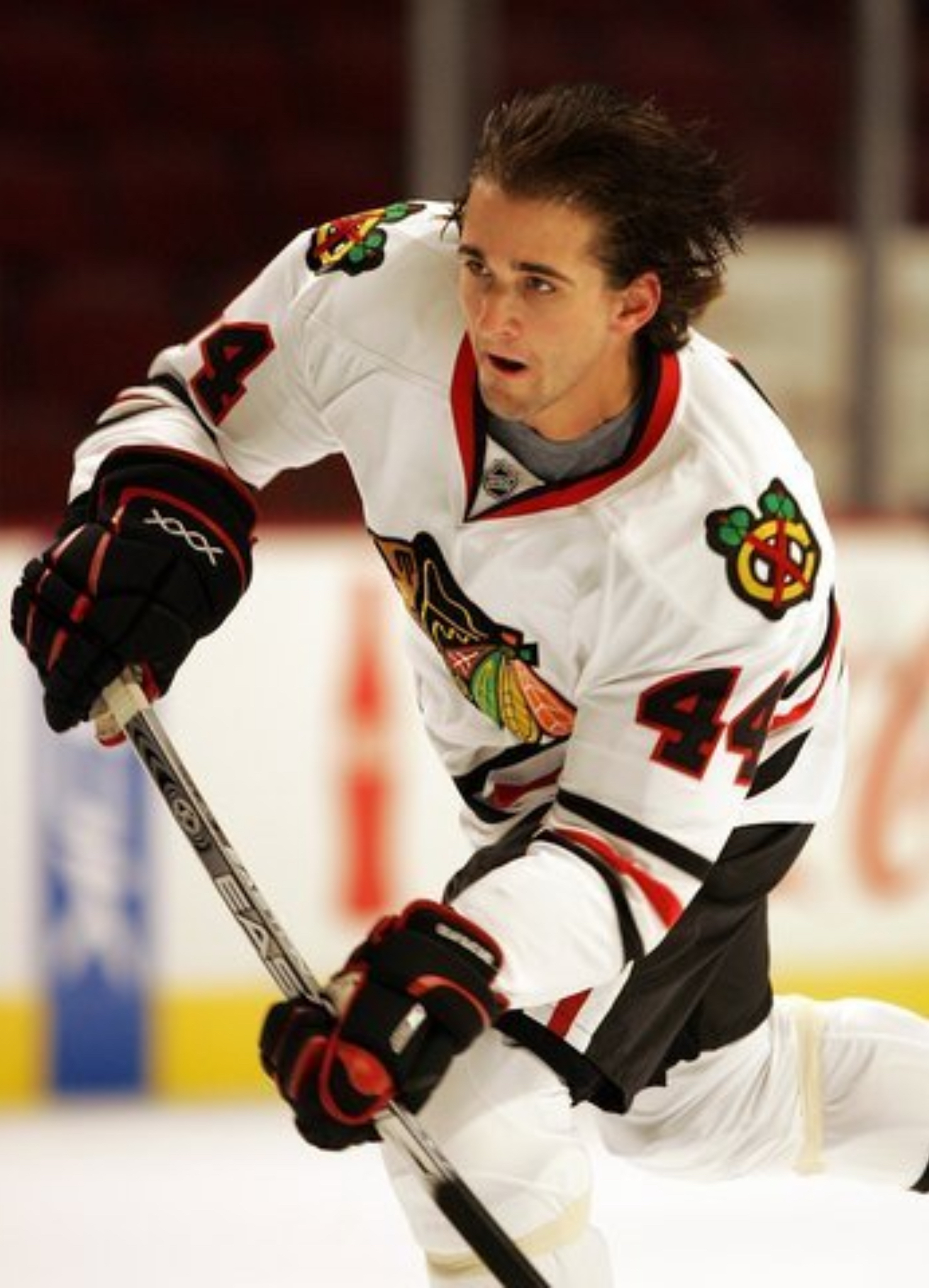
- Born: August 1, 1984 (age 42) Chicago, Illinois, U.S.
- Height: 6 ft 0 in (183 cm)
- Weight: 194 lb (88 kg; 13 st 12 lb)
- Position: Defense
- Shot: Left
- Played for: Carolina Hurricanes; Chicago Blackhawks; Lahti Pelicans; EC Red Bull Salzburg; EHC München; Adler Mannheim; Eisbären Berlin
- NHL draft: 31st overall, 2003; Carolina Hurricanes
- Playing career: 2004–2019

Daniel "Danny" Richmond (born August 1, 1984) is an American former professional ice hockey defenseman who most recently played for Eisbären Berlin of the Deutsche Eishockey Liga (DEL). He is the son of former NHL defenseman, Steve Richmond.

== Playing career ==
=== Amateur career ===
As a youth, Richmond played in the 1998 Quebec International Pee-Wee Hockey Tournament with a minor ice hockey team representing the State of Illinois.

Prior to playing professionally, Richmond played one season each in three different leagues. In 2001–02, Richmond was named the league Rookie of the Year playing for the Chicago Steel of the United States Hockey League, and was named first-team USHL All-Star. His dad was the coach of the Chicago Steel that season. In 2002–03, Richmond played collegiate hockey for the University of Michigan in the Central Collegiate Hockey Association, and was named to the CCHA All-Rookie Team. Richmond played for the London Knights of the Ontario Hockey League in 2003–04. Richmond also played in the 2004 International Ice Hockey Federation World Junior Championships, helping the United States win the gold medal with two assists in the gold-medal game.

=== Professional career ===
Richmond was drafted by the Carolina Hurricanes with the first pick in the second round (the 31st overall selection) in the 2003 NHL entry draft, and signed a three-year contract with Carolina on September 15, 2004. Richmond's first professional season was with the Lowell Lock Monsters of the American Hockey League (AHL) in 2004–05, where Richmond scored four goals and had nine assists in 63 games.

In the 2005–06 season, Richmond split time between Lowell and Carolina, appearing in ten games for the Hurricanes and tallying one assist, and was named to the AHL Planet USA All-Star Team. On January 20, 2006, Richmond was traded by the Hurricanes to the Chicago Blackhawks for Anton Babchuk, and was assigned to the Norfolk Admirals of the AHL.

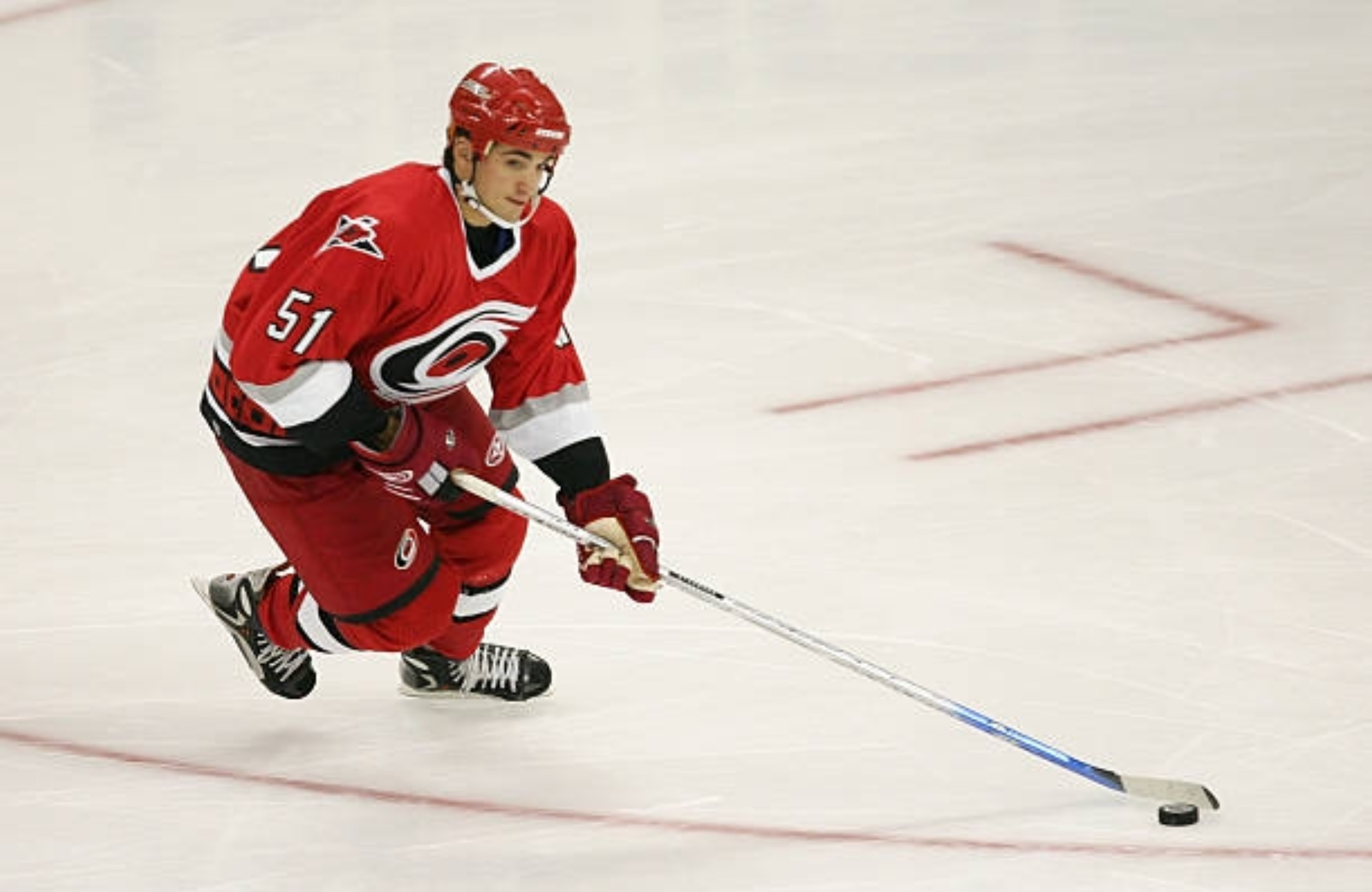
Richmond with Carolina Hurricanes.

On July 17, 2008, Richmond was traded to the Pittsburgh Penguins in exchange for Tim Brent. In the 2008–09 season, Richmond was assigned to Pittsburgh affiliate, the Wilkes-Barre/Scranton Penguins. Richmond played in 55 games with the Penguins before he was traded to the St. Louis Blues in exchange for Andy Wozniewski on March 4, 2009.

On July 20, 2009, Richmond re-signed to a one-year contract with the Blues. Danny started the 2009–10 season with the Rivermen and played in 54 games before he was traded along with Hannu Toivonen, back to the Blackhawks, for Joe Fallon on March 1, 2010.

On June 11, 2010 Richmond was an honorary guest in the Chicago Blackhawks Stanley Cup parade through Chicago. On September 30, 2010 Richmond received a Stanley Cup ring along with other Blackhawk players and staff at a private ceremony.

On July 3, 2011, Richmond signed a one-year contract with the Washington Capitals organization. Assigned to AHL affiliate, the Hershey Bears for the 2011–12 season, Richmond played in only 24 games before he was traded by the Capitals to the Colorado Avalanche in exchange for Mike Carman on February 2, 2012. He was immediately assigned to AHL affiliate, the Lake Erie Monsters, where Richmond was credited in helping the Monsters in a late season push by scoring 7 points in 23 games.

Unable to reach the playoffs with the Monsters, Richmond signed before free agency in North America to a one-year contract with Finnish team Lahti Pelicans of the SM-liiga on May 23, 2012. In the 2012–13 season, Richmond was leading the lowly Pelicans from the Blueline with 18 points in 39 games, before he was released from his contract and signed for the remainder of the season with European club, EC Red Bull Salzburg of the Austrian Hockey League, on January 27, 2013.

After helping Salzburg reach the EBEL semi-finals, Richmond left as a free agent and opted to remain in Europe in signing a one-year contract with German club, EHC München of the DEL, on June 17, 2013.

On June 19, 2014, Richmond transferred from Munich to rivals Adler Mannheim, agreeing to a two-year deal.

In his first season with the Adler Mannheim, Richmond won the DEL championship, defeating Ingolstadt in 6 games. Richmond led all defenders in points for the Adler with 8 goals and 32 assists

After three seasons with Mannheim, Richmond left as a free agent to sign a two-year deal with Eisbären Berlin on May 31, 2017.

After two seasons with Berlin, Richmond ended his playing career and joined the Winnipeg Jets in the NHL as a professional scout.

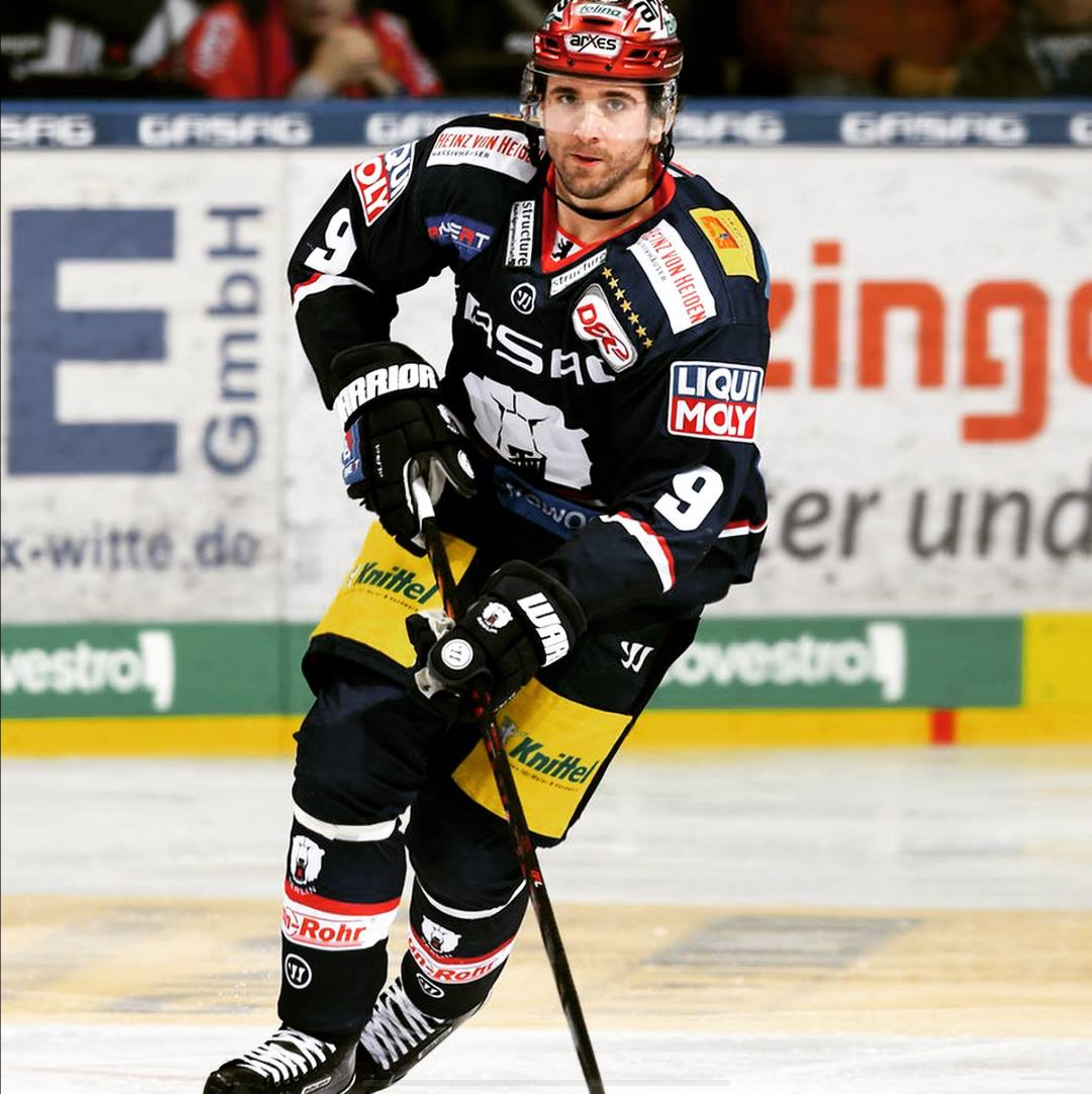
Richmond with Eisbären Berlin.

== Personal life ==
Richmond's father, Steve, played in the NHL with the New York Rangers, Detroit Red Wings, New Jersey Devils, and the Los Angeles Kings.

== Career statistics ==
=== Regular season and playoffs ===
			Regular season					Playoffs
Season	Team	League	GP	G	A	Pts	PIM	GP	G	A	Pts	PIM
2000–01	Team Illinois AAA	U18	79	25	40	65	98	—	—	—	—	—
2001–02	Chicago Steel	USHL	56	8	45	53	129	4	0	4	4	20
2002–03	University of Michigan	CCHA	43	3	19	22	48	—	—	—	—	—
2003–04	London Knights	OHL	59	13	22	35	92	15	5	6	11	10
2004–05	Lowell Lock Monsters	AHL	63	4	9	13	139	6	0	2	2	8
2005–06	Lowell Lock Monsters	AHL	32	4	11	15	60	—	—	—	—	—
2005–06	Carolina Hurricanes	NHL	10	0	1	1	7	—	—	—	—	—
2005–06	Chicago Blackhawks	NHL	10	0	0	0	18	—	—	—	—	—
2005–06	Norfolk Admirals	AHL	31	4	8	12	42	3	0	1	1	2
2006–07	Norfolk Admirals	AHL	57	10	24	34	144	6	0	0	0	8
2006–07	Chicago Blackhawks	NHL	22	0	2	2	48	—	—	—	—	—
2007–08	Chicago Blackhawks	NHL	7	0	0	0	2	—	—	—	—	—
2007–08	Rockford IceHogs	AHL	40	2	12	14	156	—	—	—	—	—
2008–09	Wilkes–Barre/Scranton Penguins	AHL	55	3	14	17	108	—	—	—	—	—
2008–09	Peoria Rivermen	AHL	18	1	4	5	21	7	0	4	4	2
2009–10	Peoria Rivermen	AHL	54	1	15	16	135	—	—	—	—	—
2009–10	Rockford IceHogs	AHL	15	0	6	6	31	4	0	1	1	5
2010–11	Toronto Marlies	AHL	68	3	20	23	121	—	—	—	—	—
2011–12	Hershey Bears	AHL	24	0	4	4	48	—	—	—	—	—
2011–12	Lake Erie Monsters	AHL	23	2	5	7	38	—	—	—	—	—
2012–13	Pelicans	SM-l	39	4	14	18	34	—	—	—	—	—
2012–13	EC Red Bull Salzburg	AUT	5	1	1	2	0	12	2	5	7	29
2013–14	EHC Red Bull München	DEL	52	7	28	35	58	3	2	1	3	2
2014–15	Adler Mannheim	DEL	49	7	26	33	93	15	1	6	7	26
2015–16	Adler Mannheim	DEL	50	9	19	28	86	3	0	3	3	0
2016–17	Adler Mannheim	DEL	49	5	23	28	85	7	0	3	3	6
2017–18	Eisbären Berlin	DEL	39	4	14	18	46	18	2	6	8	28
2018–19	Eisbären Berlin	DEL	45	1	10	11	90	8	0	1	1	0
AHL totals			480	34	132	166	1043	26	0	8	8	25
NHL totals			49	0	3	3	75	—	—	—	—	—
DEL totals			284	33	120	153	458	54	5	20	25	62

=== International ===
Year	Team	Event	Result	GP	G	A	Pts	PIM
2004	United States	WJC	1st place, gold medalist(s)	6	0	4	4	4
Junior totals				6	0	4	4	4

== Awards and honors ==
Award	Year
USHL
Rookie of the Year	2002
College
All-CCHA Rookie Team	2003
