= Warren Page =

American hunter and outdoor writer (1910–1977)

- Born: Warren Kempton Page; 1910; New Bedford, Massachusetts, US
- Died: January 22, 1977 (aged 67); New Canaan, Connecticut, US
- Education: Harvard University
- Occupations: Hunter, outdoor writer
- Writing career
- Years active: 1947–1971
- Military career
- Allegiance: United States
- Branch: Navy
- Rank: Lieutenant
- Conflicts: World War II

Warren Kempton Page (1910 – January 22, 1977) was an American hunter and outdoor writer for magazines.

== Biography ==
Page was born in 1910, in New Bedford, Massachusetts, and grew up fishing. He graduated from Harvard University in 1931. He was an English teacher at the Lawrenceville School until World War II, when he enlisted to the United States Navy and taught gunnery to fellow soldiers; he retired at the rank of lieutenant. He married Martha Lutz, having two children together. He became an alcoholic following World War II, but quit in the 1940s.

Page was an avid hunter, and hunted in Africa, Australia and India, with Field & Stream editor Hugh Grey—who hired Page to the magazine in 1947. Page had hunted most major species of the regions. He primarily hunted with 7mm Mashburn Super Magnum ammunition and a Remington firearm. He also received the Weatherby Award in 1958, organized the national benchrest shooting tournament, was a co-commissioner for the International Council for Game and Wildlife Conservation, and formed the National Shooting Sports Foundation in 1961. He was a member of the African Wildlife Foundation, the Camp Fire Club and Ducks Unlimited, among other clubs and organizations. He was also inducted into the Hunting and Bench Rest Hall of Fame.

Page was an editor for Field & Stream for 24 years and wrote more than 600 articles in his career. He retired in 1971. He died on January 22, 1977, aged 67, in New Canaan, Connecticut.
