= Hal Shockey =

Canadian hunter

- Born: 1927; Vanscoy, Saskatchewan, Canada
- Died: October 1, 2013
- Occupation(s): Hunter, star guest on TV, road worker
- Known for: Hunting skills
- Television: Outdoor Channel
- Spouse: Lil Shockey
- Children: Jim Shockey
- Relatives: Eva Shockey, Louise Shockey, Branlin Shockey, Len Johann

Hal Shockey (1927 – October 1, 2013) was a Canadian outdoorsman. He was born on a homestead near Vanscoy, Saskatchewan, but he spent most of his adult life in Saskatoon, Saskatchewan. After retiring from his job in road construction at the age of sixty-six, his son, Jim Shockey, invited him to work for his outfitting show and company. From that point, Hal Shockey became an important character on his son's hunting TV show, Jim Shockey's Hunting Adventures, which aired on the Outdoor Channel in America and Wild TV in Canada.

Hal Shockey married Lil Shockey. He is related to Jim Shockey, Eva Shockey, Len Johann, and Branlin Shockey.

== Death ==
Shockey died of natural causes at the age of 86 on October 1, 2013. On January 9, 2014, an episode of Jim Shockey's Hunting Adventures entitled "My Father, My Daddy, My Hero" aired in his memory.
