= Jim Shockey =

Canadian hunter (born 1957)

- Born: December 20, 1957 (age 68); Saskatoon, Saskatchewan
- Occupations: Hunter, Outdoorsman, Producer
- Known for: Hunting Skills and Conservation Efforts
- Notable work: Producer/host of Jim Shockey's Uncharted, Jim Shockey's Hunting Adventures
- Television: Outdoor Channel and Sportsman Channel
- Spouse: Louise Shockey (1984 - 2023) Serena Shockey (2025)
- Children: Eva Shockey and Branlin Shockey
- Parent(s): Hal Shockey and Lil Shockey
- Awards: Outdoor Sportsman Awards, Weatherby Hunting and Conservation Award
- Website: http://www.jimshockey.com/

Jim Shockey (born 1957) is a Canadian outdoor writer, a professional big game outfitter and television producer and host for many hunting shows. Shockey is the former producer and host of Jim Shockey's Hunting Adventures and Jim Shockey's Uncharted on Outdoor Channel and Jim Shockey's The Professionals on Outdoor Channel and Sportsman Channel. His hunting adventures have spanned six continents and 50 countries.

== Career ==
=== Early life ===
Shockey was born in Saskatoon, Saskatchewan and attended Simon Fraser University.

=== Professional career ===
Shockey is a member of the Pro Staff or a brand ambassador for Leupold Optics, Stealth Cam (former), Nosler (former), Crosman/Benjamin (former), Yeti Coolers, Christensen Arms, and a partner of Bowtech Archery. In May 2016, Shockey become the co-founding partner of BookYourHunt.com, an online marketplace for hunting trips.

=== Television series ===
Shockey hosted four TV series that appear on outdoor lifestyle TV networks Outdoor Channel and Sportsman Channel, Shock Therapy, Jim Shockey's Hunting Adventures, Jim Shockey's UNCHARTED, Jim Shockey's The Professionals, Jim Shockey's Shock Therapy and Jim Shockey's Rogue River Men. His daughter, Eva Shockey, acted as co-host on Jim Shockey's Hunting Adventures. In addition, he has produced over several programs on television including Aboriginal Peoples Television Network (APTN) shows like Yukon Harvest and Coastal Carvings.

Between 2009 and 2015, Shockey won 15 awards at the annual Outdoor Channel "Golden Moose" Awards and won one award at Sportsman Channel's "Sportsman Choice" Awards of 2014.

In 2016, the two networks joined forces and hosted the "Outdoor Sportsman Awards" ceremony, and in 2017 Shockey won the "Outdoor Sportsman Awards" for Best Overall TV Series. In 2018, he was bestowed two Fan Favorite awards for Uncharted: Best Big Game Hunting Series and Best Education/Entertainment Series. In 2019, Shockey was honored with an award for Best Sound Design for Hunting Adventures and Fan Favorite Best Big Game Hunting Series for Uncharted.

Shockey has been called by Outdoor Life magazine "the most accomplished big-game hunter of the modern era, having taken arguably the most free-range big game species by any living hunter." They also noted that he is "the most influential celebrity in big-game hunting."

=== The Hand of Man Museum ===
An avid and active collector of tribal and ethnocentric folk art forms. In 2018, Shockey created and curated the 15,500 square foot Hand of Man Museum of Natural History, Cultural Arts and Conservation in Maple Bay, British Columbia to store his collections.

== Personal life ==
Shockey married Louise (née Johann) in 1984. The couple are parents to two children, Branlin and Eva Shockey and grandparent to four grandchildren have both joined Shockey in his hunting and entertainment business. On September 21, 2023, Louise Shockey died after a two-year battle with cancer.

Shockey is a member of The Explorers Club.

== Awards ==
Safari Club International Awards

- Fourth Pinnacle of Achievement Award, 2008
- Zenith Award, 2009
- Crowning Achievement Award, 2009
- Professional Hunter Award, 2009
- C. J. McElroy Award, 2009
- World Hunting Award, 2010
- International Hunter of the Year, 2012
- World Conservation & Hunting Award, 2012
- The Pantheon Award, 2016 - awarded jointly with GSCO
- The SCI Family Legacy Award, 2025

Other Awards

- The Conklin Award, 2016 - awarded by the Conklin Foundation, this award recognizes the world's greatest active hunter who pursues game in the most difficult terrain and conditions while abiding by the highest standards of ethics and fair chase.
- The Ovis Award, 2018 - the top award of GSCO, it "recognizes individuals who have had an overwhelming passion for hunting the mountains and doing so in fair chase and with total integrity."
- Weatherby Hunting and Conservation Award, 2018 - bestowed by the Weatherby Foundation, it is awarded annually to the hunter that has ethically taken the most varied, difficult, and largest number of species in the world.
