= Foot per second =

Unit of speed

foot per second
- Unit system: Imperial, United States customary units
- Unit of: speed
- Symbol: ft/s, fps

Conversions
1 ft/s, fps in ...	... is equal to ...
- m/s: 0.3048
- mph: 0.6818
- kn: 0.5925
- km/h: 1.0973

The foot per second (plural feet per second) is a unit of both speed (scalar) and velocity (vector quantity, which includes direction). It expresses the distance in feet (ft) traveled or displaced, divided by the time in seconds (s).

The corresponding unit in the International System of Units (SI) is the meter per second.

Abbreviations include ft/s, fps, and the scientific notation ft s^{−1}.

== Conversions ==
Conversions between common units of speed
	m/s	km/h	mph (mi/h)	knot	fps (ft/s)
1 m/s =	1	3.600000	2.236936*	1.943844*	3.280840*
1 km/h =	0.277778*	1	0.621371*	0.539957*	0.911344*
1 mph (mi/h) =	0.44704	1.609344	1	0.868976*	1.466667*
1 knot =	0.514444*	1.852	1.150779*	1	1.687810*
1 fps (ft/s) =	0.3048	1.09728	0.681818*	0.592484*	1

(* = approximate values)

== See also ==
- Foot per second squared, a corresponding unit of acceleration.
- Feet per minute
