= Sportsmen's Heritage And Recreational Enhancement Act of 2013 =

Sportsmen’s Heritage And Recreational Enhancement Act of 2013
- Long title: To protect and enhance opportunities for recreational hunting, fishing, and shooting, and for other purposes.
- Announced in: the 113th United States Congress
- Sponsored by: Rep. Robert E. Latta (R, OH-5)
- Number of co-sponsors: 3

Codification
- Acts affected: Pittman-Robertson Wildlife Restoration Act, Marine Mammal Protection Act of 1972, Toxic Substances Control Act, Internal Revenue Code of 1986, and others.
- U.S.C. sections affected: 28 U.S.C. ch. 171, 16 U.S.C. § 460l–6d, 16 U.S.C. § 669 et seq., 16 U.S.C. § 1131 et seq., 16 U.S.C. § 669a, and others.
- Agencies affected: United States Congress, Rural Utilities Service, United States Forest Service, Natural Resources Conservation Service, Farm Service Agency, United States Department of Commerce, United States Department of the Interior, Bureau of Land Management, National Park Service, U.S. Fish and Wildlife Service

Legislative history
- Introduced in the House as H.R. 3590 by Rep. Robert E. Latta (R, OH-5) on November 21, 2013; Committee consideration by United States House Committee on Natural Resources, United States House Committee on Agriculture, United States House Committee on the Judiciary, United States House Committee on Transportation and Infrastructure, United States House Committee on Energy and Commerce, United States House Transportation Subcommittee on Water Resources and Environment, United States House Energy Subcommittee on Environment and Economy, United States House Agriculture Subcommittee on Conservation, Energy, and Forestry, United States House Judiciary Subcommittee on the Constitution and Civil Justice, United States House Judiciary Subcommittee on Crime, Terrorism, Homeland Security and Investigations; Passed the House on February 5, 2014 (Roll Call Vote #41: 268-154)

The Sportsmen’s Heritage And Recreational Enhancement Act of 2013 (H.R. 3590) is an omnibus bill that covers several firearms, fishing, hunting, and federal land laws. H.R. 3590 would establish or amend certain laws related to the use of firearms and other recreational activities on federal lands. The bill also would authorize the U.S. Fish and Wildlife Service (USFWS) to permanently allow any state to provide hunting and conservation stamps for migratory birds (referred to as federal duck stamps). In addition, the bill would require the Secretaries of the Interior and Agriculture to charge an annual permit fee for small crews that conduct commercial filming activities on certain federal lands. Finally, the bill would require the Secretary of the Interior to issue permits to certain hunters seeking to import polar bear remains from Canada.

It passed the United States House of Representatives on February 5, 2014 during the 113th United States Congress.

Another bill known as the SHARE Act was introduced during the 115th Congress in the House as H.R. 3668.

== Background ==
According to Fishing Tackle Retailer, an industry magazine, there are over 50 million fishers and hunters in the United States.

== Provisions of the bill ==
This summary is based largely on the summary provided by the Congressional Research Service, a public domain source.

The Sportsmen's Heritage And Recreational Enhancement Act of 2013 or the SHARE Act of 2013 is divided into multiple titles.

Title I: Hunting, Fishing and Recreational Shooting Protection Act - The Hunting, Fishing, and Recreational Shooting Protection Act would amend the Toxic Substances Control Act (TSCA) to exclude from the definition of "chemical substance" for purposes of such Act: (1) any component of any pistol, revolver, firearm, shell, or cartridge the sale of which is subject to federal excise tax, including shot, bullets and other projectiles, propellants, and primers; and (2) any sport fishing equipment the sale of which is subject to federal excise tax and sport fishing equipment components.

Title II: Target Practice and Marksmanship Training Support Act - The Target Practice and Marksmanship Training Support Act would amend the Pittman-Robertson Wildlife Restoration Act to: (1) authorize a state to pay up to 90% of the costs of acquiring land for, expanding, or constructing a public target range; (2) authorize a state to elect to allocate 10% of a specified amount apportioned to it from the federal aid to wildlife restoration fund for such costs; (3) limit the federal share of such costs under such Act to 90%; and (4) require amounts provided for such costs under such Act to remain available for expenditure and obligation for five fiscal years.

This title would also shield the United States from any civil action or claim for money damages for injury to or loss of property, personal injury, or death caused by an activity occurring at a public target range that is funded by the federal government pursuant to such Act or located on federal land, except to the extent provided under the Federal Tort Claims Act with respect to the exercise or performance of a discretionary function.

This title would also urge the Chief of the United States Forest Service and the Director of the Bureau of Land Management to cooperate with state and local authorities and other entities to carry out waste removal and other activities on any federal land used as a public target range to encourage its continued use for target practice or marksmanship training.

Title III: Public Lands Filming - This title would require the Secretary of the Interior and the Secretary of Agriculture (USDA), for any film crew of five persons or fewer, to require a permit and assess an annual fee of $200 for commercial filming activities or similar projects on federal land and waterways administered by the Secretary. It would make such a permit valid for such activities or projects that occur in areas designated for public use during public hours on all federal land and waterways administered by the Secretary for a 12-month period.

Title IV: Polar Bear Conservation and Fairness Act - The Polar Bear Conservation and Fairness Act of 2013 would amend the Marine Mammal Protection Act of 1972 to direct the Secretary of the Interior to issue a permit for the importation of any polar bear part (other than an internal organ) from a polar bear taken in a sport hunt in Canada to any person: (1) who submits proof that the polar bear was legally harvested before February 18, 1997 (current law); or (2) who has submitted, with an application submitted before May 15, 2008, proof that the bear was legally harvested before such date from a polar bear population from which a sport-hunted trophy could be imported before such date. (Polar bears were listed as a threatened species by the Department of the Interior on May 14, 2008.)

Title V: Permanent Electronic Duck Stamp Act - The Permanent Electronic Duck Stamp Act of 2013 would amend the Fish and Wildlife Improvement Act of 1978 to exempt an authorized taking of migratory birds and collection of their eggs by indigenous inhabitants of Alaska from the prohibition on taking under the Migratory Bird Hunting and Conservation Stamp Act.

Title V would also grant the Secretary of the Interior permanent authority to authorize any state to issue electronic duck stamps. It would also set forth state electronic duck stamp application requirements. Title V would allow the Secretary to determine the number of new states permitted per year to participate in the electronic duck stamp program. It also instructs the Secretary to require electronic stamp revenue and customer information collected by each state to be transmitted in accordance with a written agreement between the Secretary and the state.

Title VI: Access to Water Resources Development Projects Act The Recreational Lands Self-Defense Act of 2013 would prohibit the Secretary of the Army from promulgating or enforcing any regulation that prohibits an individual from possessing a firearm at a water resources development project administered by the Chief of Engineers if: (1) the individual is not otherwise prohibited by law from possessing the firearm, and (2) the possession of the firearm is in compliance with the law of the state in which the project is located.

Title VII: Wildlife and Hunting Heritage Conservation Council Advisory Committee This title would amend the Fish and Wildlife Coordination Act to establish the Wildlife and Hunting Heritage Conservation Council Advisory Committee to advise the Secretaries of the Interior and Agriculture (USDA) on wildlife and habitat conservation, hunting, and recreational shooting.

Title VII would abolish the Wildlife and Hunting Heritage Conservation Council.

Title VIII: Recreational Fishing and Hunting Heritage and Opportunities Act The Recreational Fishing and Hunting Heritage and Opportunities Act would declare that recreational fishing and hunting are environmentally acceptable and beneficial activities that occur and can be provided on public lands and waters without adverse effects on other uses or users.

This title would require a federal public land management official, in cooperation with the respective state and fish and wildlife agency, to exercise the authority of the official under law, including regarding land use planning, to facilitate the use of, and access to, federal public land for fishing, sport hunting, and recreational shooting, except as described in this Act.

It would require the heads of federal public land management agencies to exercise their discretion in a manner that supports and facilitates hunting, recreational fishing, and recreational shooting opportunities, to the extent authorized under applicable law.

The Recreational Fishing and Hunting Heritage and Opportunities Act would prohibit actions taken under this Act or actions concerning the National Wildlife Refuge System under the National Wildlife Refuge System Administration Act of 1966 from being considered to be a major federal action significantly affecting the quality of the human environment.

The Recreational Fishing and Hunting Heritage and Opportunities Act would prohibit public land management officials from being required to consider the existence or availability of recreational fishing, hunting, or shooting opportunities on adjacent or nearby lands in the planning for or determination of which public lands are open for these activities or in the setting of levels of use for these activities on public lands, unless the combination or coordination of such opportunities would enhance the opportunities available to the public.

It would require that Bureau of Land Management (BLM) and Forest Service land, excluding land on the Outer Continental Shelf, be open to recreational fishing, hunting, or shooting unless the managing agency acts to close lands to such activity. It would permit closures or restrictions on such land for purposes including resource conservation, public safety, energy or mineral production, energy generation or transmission infrastructure, water supply facilities, national security, protection of private property rights, or compliance with other law.

The Recreational Fishing and Hunting Heritage and Opportunities Act would require agencies to: (1) lease or permit use of federal public land for shooting ranges, and (2) designate specific land for recreational shooting activities. It would declare that the provision of opportunities for hunting, fishing, recreational shooting, and the conservation of fish and wildlife to provide sustainable use recreational opportunities on designated wilderness areas on federal public lands constitutes the measures necessary to meet the minimum requirements for the administration of such areas. It would provide that such declaration does not authorize or facilitate commodity development, use, or extraction, motorized recreational access or use that is not otherwise allowed under the Wilderness Act, or permanent road construction or maintenance within designated wilderness areas.

The Recreational Fishing and Hunting Heritage and Opportunities Act would reaffirm the provisions of the Wilderness Act that stipulate that wilderness purposes are "within and supplemental to" the purposes of the underlying federal land unit. It would require the head of each federal agency, when seeking to carry out fish and wildlife conservation programs and projects or providing fish and wildlife dependent recreation opportunities on designated wilderness areas, to implement these supplemental purposes while not impeding on the underlying conservation purpose. It would prohibit such implementation from authorizing or facilitating commodity development, use or extraction, or permanent road construction or use within designated wilderness areas.

The Recreational Fishing and Hunting Heritage and Opportunities Act would require biennial reports on closures of federal public lands to sport hunting, recreational fishing, or shooting. It would set forth requirements for specified closures or significant restrictions involving 640 or more contiguous acres of federal public land or water to hunting or recreational fishing or related activities.

The Recreational Fishing and Hunting Heritage and Opportunities Act would instruct federal public land agencies to consult with the advisory councils specified in Executive Orders 12962 (relating to recreational fisheries) and 13443 (relating to the facilitation of hunting heritage and wildlife conservation) in carrying out this Act.

== Congressional Budget Office report ==
A title by title summary and report on H.R. 3590 by the Congressional Budget Office.

This summary is based largely on the summary provided by the Congressional Budget Office, as introduced on November 21, 2013. This is a public domain source.

H.R. 3590 would establish or amend certain laws related to the use of firearms and other recreational activities on federal lands. The bill also would authorize the U.S. Fish and Wildlife Service (USFWS) to permanently allow any state to provide hunting and conservation stamps for migratory birds (referred to as federal duck stamps). In addition, the bill would require the Secretaries of the Interior and Agriculture to charge an annual permit fee for small crews that conduct commercial filming activities on certain federal lands. Finally, the bill would require the Secretary of the Interior to issue permits to certain hunters seeking to import polar bear remains from Canada.

Based on information provided by the affected agencies, the Congressional Budget Office (CBO) estimates that implementing H.R. 3590 would have no significant net impact on the federal budget. Enacting the legislation would affect direct spending and revenues; therefore, pay-as-you-go procedures apply. However, CBO estimates that the net budgetary effects would not be significant in any year.

H.R. 3590 contains no intergovernmental mandates as defined in the Unfunded Mandates Reform Act (UMRA).

H.R. 3590 would impose a private-sector mandate as defined in UMRA by eliminating an individual’s existing right to seek compensation from the federal government for damages occurring at a public target range supported by federal funds. The cost of the mandate would be the forgone value of awards and settlements in such claims. Information from the Department of the Interior indicates that few, if any, of those types of lawsuits are brought against the U.S. government. Because such claims would probably continue to be uncommon in the future, CBO estimates that the cost of the mandate would be small and fall well below the annual threshold established in UMRA for private-sector mandates ($152 million in 2014, adjusted annually for inflation).

== Procedural history ==
The Recreational Fishing and Hunting Heritage and Opportunities Act was introduced into the United States House of Representatives on November 21, 2013 by Rep. Robert E. Latta (R, OH-5). It was referred to several committees and subcommittees, including: United States House Committee on Natural Resources, United States House Committee on Agriculture, United States House Committee on the Judiciary, United States House Committee on Transportation and Infrastructure, United States House Committee on Energy and Commerce, United States House Transportation Subcommittee on Water Resources and Environment, United States House Energy Subcommittee on Environment and Economy, United States House Agriculture Subcommittee on Conservation, Energy, and Forestry, United States House Judiciary Subcommittee on the Constitution and Civil Justice, United States House Judiciary Subcommittee on Crime, Terrorism, Homeland Security and Investigations. Eleven proposed amendments were ruled in order for the House to debate and vote on. On February 5, 2014, the House voted in Roll Call Vote #41 to pass the bill 268-154.

== Debate and discussion ==
President Barack Obama announced his opposition to the bill, but did not threaten to veto it. The Obama Administration said that it was fine with several parts of the bill, including the polar bear trophy importation rules, issuing duck stamps electronically, and not counting some fishing equipment as a toxic substance. The administration said that it supports Titles II, IV, V, and does not object to Title I. However, the administration said that it was against Titles VIII and VI, with concerns about VII and III.

The Bull Moose Sportsmen's Alliance spoke out in favor of the bill. Their director Gaspar Perricone described the bill as "a great first step towards getting a sportsmen's package passed by Congress" and said that it "addresses a lot of critical concerns for sportsmen." He did say, however, that the "bill has a few question marks that we'd like to see clarified and we'd love to have some funding for critical conservation projects."

The U.S. Sportsmen's Alliance was also in favor of the bill, and urged members to call their representatives in Congress and ask them to vote in favor of the bill.

Some Democrats opposed the bill because it was a "waste of time". According to Rep. Jim McGovern (D-MA), "seventy-five percent of all federal lands are open to recreational hunting, fishing and shooting."

== See also ==
- List of bills in the 113th United States Congress
