= National Shooting Sports Foundation =

American national trade association

National Shooting Sports Foundation Inc.
- Abbreviation: NSSF
- Formation: 1961; 65 years ago
- Founder: Warren Page
- Type: Industry trade group Lobby group
- Legal status: Foundation (501(c)(6))
- Purpose: gun lobby
- Headquarters: Shelton, Connecticut
- President: Joseph Bartozzi
- Revenue: $58,981,425 USD (2024)
- Expenses: $50,204,286 USD (2024)
- Website: www.nssf.org

The National Shooting Sports Foundation (NSSF) is an American national trade association for the firearms industry that is based in Newtown, Connecticut. Formed in 1961 by Warren Page, the organization has more than 8,000 members:

The NSSF helps write safety and instruction standards. The NSSF sponsors the annual Shooting Hunting and Outdoor Trade Show, the (SHOT Show). The NSSF has advocated in favor of gun rights, including arguing against limits on high capacity magazines and the broad use of the term "assault weapon". It has also supported legislation allowing concealed carry and has offered proposals to prohibit the Environmental Protection Agency from regulating chemicals in ammunition as well as other sports such as fishing where lead is routinely used for its density. According to OpenSecrets, in 2024 NSSF spent $6.97 million on lobbying compared to $2.04 million by the NRA.

== SHOT Show ==
The NSSF owns and sponsors the SHOT Show trade fair, held annually in Las Vegas. SHOT Show is the largest gun show in the United States, attracting over 50,000 attendees to its 630,000 square feet of exhibition space in Las Vegas. It is among the top 25 trade shows in the country.

== Industry and NSSF history ==
The state of Connecticut has a long history in the manufacture of guns, going back to Eli Whitney and Samuel Colt. Since 2000, as the national interest in hunting has declined according to one report, gun manufacturers have increasingly relied on the sale of high-powered semi-automatic rifles. In that context, the NSSF has concentrated on marketing semi-automatic rifles.

Between 2000 and 2003 the Federal Trade Commission conducted an anti-trust investigation of gun industry players including the NSSF. It was alleged that they were boycotting Smith & Wesson due to that company's agreement with the Clinton administration to require background checks on purchasers and provide gun locks. The probe was suspended in 2003 by the Bush administration, with the NSSF's general counsel claiming it had been politically motivated.

In response to the Sandy Hook Elementary School shooting that occurred in Newtown on December 14, 2012, 3 miles (4.8 km) from the organization's headquarters, the NSSF expressed its sympathies on its website and declined to immediately comment. The following month, Sanetti noted that his employees were personally affected by the Newtown massacre, saying in a speech at the 2013 SHOT Show: "Who among us has not been moved by that unspeakable tragedy that was inflicted by a deranged man upon the children of Newtown, Conn., our very home as the NSSF?"

== Legislation ==
The NSSF supported the Bipartisan Sportsmen's Act of 2014 (S. 2363; 113th Congress). The NSSF thanked Senator Thad Cochran for co-sponsoring the bill.

In July 2024, the NSSF signed a letter to members of both the House Committee on Armed Services and the Senate Committee on Armed Services opposing Section 828 of S. 4628, the National Defense Authorization Act for Fiscal Year 2025, entitled "Requirement for Contractors to Provide Reasonable Access to Repair Materials," which would require contractors doing business with the US military to agree "to provide the Department of Defense fair and reasonable access to all the repair materials, including parts, tools, and information, used by the manufacturer or provider or their authorized partners to diagnose, maintain, or repair the good or service."

== Controversies ==
Reportedly, "At least 10 gun industry businesses, including Glock, Smith & Wesson, Remington, Marlin and Mossberg, handed over names, addresses and other private data" to the NSSF for a database that contained at least 5.5 million people. The database was central to the NSSF's voter education program "to persuade people to vote for the firearms industry’s preferred political candidates" which it spent over $20 million on between 2000 and 2016. "The NSSF trumpeted the success of its electioneering in reports, claiming credit for putting both George W. Bush and Donald J. Trump in the White House and firearm-friendly lawmakers in the U.S. House and Senate". "In April 2016, a contractor on NSSF’s voter education project delivered a large cache of data to Cambridge Analytica". The database was at odds with NSSF opposition to "government and corporate attempts to amass information on gun buyers". In 2025, a lawsuit sought for the "NSSF to pay firearms purchasers for the value of what it took without permission".

== See also ==
- Gun Owners of America
- National Rifle Association of America
