= Permanent Electronic Duck Stamp Act of 2013 =

- Long title: To grant the Secretary of the Interior permanent authority to authorize States to issue electronic duck stamps, and for other purposes.
- Enacted by: the 113th United States Congress
- Announced in: the 113th United States Congress
- Sponsored by: Rep. Robert J. Wittman (R, VA-1)

Citations
- Public law: Pub. L. 113–239 (text) (PDF)

Codification
- Acts affected: Duck Stamp Act
- Agencies affected: United States Department of the Interior

Legislative history
- Introduced in the House as H.R. 1206 by Rep. Rob Wittman (R-VA) on March 14, 2013; Committee consideration by United States House Committee on Natural Resources, United States House Natural Resources Subcommittee on Fisheries, Wildlife, Oceans and Insular Affairs; Passed the House on June 3, 2013 (401-0); Passed the Senate on December 15, 2014 (by unanimous consent); Signed into law by President Barack Obama on December 18, 2014

The Permanent Electronic Duck Stamp Act of 2013 (H.R. 1206) is a bill that was passed during the 113th United States Congress. The bill authorizes the United States Department of the Interior to issue electronic duck stamps as a form of Federal Duck Stamps.

== Background ==
This Background section is primarily composed of information from the "Background and Need for Legislation" section of House Report 113-67, a public domain source.

On March 16, 1934, Congress passed the Migratory Bird Hunting Stamp Act. Under this law, every hunter over the age of 16 is required to purchase a Federal duck stamp each year to hunt migratory waterfowl. The price of a duck stamp has increased from $1 to the present cost of $15. Since the inception of the Federal Duck Stamp Program, the Fish and Wildlife Service (FWS) has collected more than $800 million from the sale of duck stamps. These monies, deposited in the Migratory Bird Conservation Fund, have been used to purchase or lease over 6 million acres of land at a total purchase price of over $1 billion for inclusion in the National Wildlife Refuge System. The Federal Duck Stamp Office has indicated that 98 percent of the dollars deposited in the Fund is used for wetland acquisition. The remaining 2 percent is spent on the printing and distribution of the stamps.

The duck stamp receipts have varied each year because of changes in waterfowl population levels, bag limits and economic conditions. The number of duck stamps sold has declined, however, from 2.5 million per year in 1971–1972 to 1.5 million stamps per year in 2011–2012. During that year, $22 million was deposited into the Migratory Bird Conservation Fund.

The Electronic Duck Stamp Act of 2006 (Pub. L. 109–266 (text) (PDF)) directed the United States Secretary of the Interior to conduct a three-year pilot program that would allow up to 15 States to issue electronic Federal migratory bird hunting stamps. Those states that choose to participate in the program were permitted to charge a reasonable fee to recover their administrative costs. In the past ten years, state electronic hunting and fishing licenses have become popular throughout the United States.

The electronic pilot program began in the 2007–2008 hunting year. There are currently eight states (Arkansas, Colorado, Florida, Idaho, Maryland, Minnesota, Texas and Wisconsin) where an individual can obtain a Federal duck stamp in an electronic form. Since its inception, more than 3.5 million stamps have been purchased in this manner. These stamps are valid for 45 days from the date of purchase.

Under Public Law 109–266, FWS is required to undertake a comprehensive evaluation of the pilot program to determine whether it has been cost-effective and a convenient means for issuing migratory bird hunting and conservation stamps. This report was submitted to Congress in August 2011 and concluded: ‘‘The E-Stamp Program has proven to be a practical method that is readily accepted by the stamp-buying public. The increased sale of E-Stamps, coupled with few complaints about the process through the three-year pilot, suggests customers are satisfied with this method of acquiring their Duck Stamps and the options available to them in their States.’’

The Permanent Electronic Duck Stamp Act of 2013 permanently allows FWS to authorize certain states to sell the annual Federal Duck Stamp.

== Provisions/Elements of the bill ==
This summary is based largely on the summary provided by the Congressional Research Service, a public domain source.

The Permanent Electronic Duck Stamp Act of 2013 grants the United States Department of the Interior permanent authority to authorize any U.S. state to issue electronic duck stamps. The bill then sets forth state electronic duck stamp application requirements.

== Procedural history ==
=== House ===
The Permanent Electronic Duck Stamp Act of 2013 (H.R. 1206) was introduced to the House on March 14, 2013 by Rep. Rob Wittman (R-VA). It was referred to the United States House Committee on Natural Resources and the United States House Natural Resources Subcommittee on Fisheries, Wildlife, Oceans and Insular Affairs.

On May 31, 2013, the House Majority Leader Eric Cantor announced that the Permanent Electronic Duck Stamp Act of 2013 was scheduled to be considered on the House floor under a suspension of the rules on June 3, 2013. The vote took place as schedule and the bill passed 401-0 recorded in Roll Call vote 184.

On November 21, 2013, Rep. Robert E. Latta (R, OH-5) introduced the Sportsmen’s Heritage And Recreational Enhancement Act of 2013 (H.R. 3590; 113th Congress) into the House. The bill was an omnibus bill - a large bill that combines several smaller ones. The Permanent Electronic Duck Stamp Act of 2013 became Title V of the omnibus bill. The Sportsmen’s Heritage And Recreational Enhancement Act of 2013 passed the House on February 5, 2014.

== See also ==
- List of bills in the 113th United States Congress
- Federal Duck Stamp
