= Eva Shockey =

Canadian media personality

- Born: January 5, 1988 (age 38); Duncan, British Columbia, Canada
- Occupations: Outdoor lifestyle influencer, TV host, Author, Blogger
- Known for: Outdoors, Bowhunting and Conservation
- Television: Outdoor Channel
- Spouse: Tim Brent (2015-present)
- Children: 2
- Parent(s): Jim Shockey and Louise Shockey
- Relatives: Hal Shockey (grandfather)
- Awards: Outdoor Channel’s Golden Moose Awards, Outdoor Sportsman Group's Outdoor Sportsman Awards
- Website: http://www.evashockey.com/

Eva Shockey (born January 5, 1988) is a Canadian author, TV personality and blogger.

== Personal life ==
Shockey was born on January 5, 1988, on Vancouver Island, Canada, to hunters and outdoors enthusiasts Jim Shockey and Louise Johann. She was about twenty years old when she began hunting, prior to which she was a dance instructor and competitive Latin ballroom dancer.

On June 20, 2015, Shockey married former professional ice hockey player Tim Brent. On January 12, 2017, the couple's first child was born, a daughter by the name of Leni Bow Brent. On August 22, 2019 the couple welcomed their second child, Boone.

== Career ==
Eva Shockey is the co-host of Jim Shockey's Hunting Adventures on Outdoor Channel alongside her father, Jim Shockey.

She appeared on the cover of Field & Stream magazine on the May 2014 issue - making her the second woman ever to be photographed for the magazine cover, the first being Queen Elizabeth II.

In November 2014, Shockey faced scrutiny and social media backlash in response to photos she posted of a black bear she had shot and killed during a hunt.

Shockey also appeared in a commercial for RAM Trucks, "Courage is Already Inside." The commercial featured an all-female cast mountain climbing, bow hunting, performing on stages, and surfing.

USA Today Hunt & Fish interviewed Jim and Eva Shockey for the cover story of their Summer/Fall 2015 issue. The father-daughter duo cover story highlights Eva’s journey to becoming the new face of the hunting industry; how hunting has always been central to Jim’s life; and the dynamic relationship between the two.

Shockey signed on as a Cabela's Brand Ambassador in May 2015. She also partnered with Under Armour as a UA Hunt athlete in July 2015; the partnership continued through December 2017.

Shockey partnered with Bowtech Archery to release two signature bows – the BowTech Eva Shockey Signature Series Compound Bow launched in 2015, and the Mossy Oak Break-Up Country finish launched in 2016.

In July 2017, Shockey was listed at No. 10 on The Hollywood Reporter's Top TV Personalities ranking, marking her first appearance on the list. On August 29, 2017, she released a book titled Taking Aim: Daring to Be Different, Happier, and Healthier in the Great Outdoors.

In March 2018, she launched a lifestyle blog covering topics such as family, food, fashion, fitness, travel, and outdoor adventure. In November 2018, Shockey served as the Thanksgiving marathon host of Last Man Standing on WGN America.

The Facebook Watch digital series Eva Shockey's Outdoor 101 launched in December 2018. The outdoor lifestyle series chronicles the adventures of Eva and her family as they traverse their adopted home state of North Carolina, sharing her favourite locations and outdoor advice.
