= Crosman Nightstalker =

Crosman NightStalker
- Type: semi-automatic air rifle
- Place of origin: United States

Production history
- Produced: 2005

Specifications
- Mass: 3.27 lb (1.48 kg)
- Length: 16.75 in (42.5 cm)

The Crosman NightStalker is the first semi-automatic air rifle featuring blowback action. Released in the United States in 2005, the NightStalker uses an 88 gram CO_{2} powerlet as its power source.

It fires .177 calibre (4.5mm) pellets from a 12 shot rotary clip at up to 580 ft/s (180 m/s). It is a carbine of modern design, weighing 3.27 lb (1.48 kg). Its total length is just over thirty inches (76 cm); its rifled barrel is 16.75 inches (42.5 cm) long.

The front and rear sights use Crosman's Mohawk sight system which allows the user to alternate between two different diameters of windage adjustable peep sight while incorporating a front sight that is adjustable for elevation. A safety mechanism is provided by a cross bolt safety switch.

== See also ==
- Crosman
