= Scenario paintball =

Type of paintball event

Thousands of scenario players listen to the opening comments of the Skirmish USA's Invasion of Normandy before playing in a 24-hour scenario game

Scenario paintball refers to a diverse array of paintball events that encompass many themes, such as historical reenactments, movies, pop culture, futuristic or video game simulations, and more. Others have no theme at all.

Such events frequently feature game mechanics such as "medics", "snipers" and "helicopters" carried out through various simulations. The common denominator for this type of play is anywhere from 75 to 5000 players, with at least 6 hours of continuous play. These events average 12 hours of game play across a weekend in 2 major play periods. The longest and most challenging events run 24 hours straight with no breaks, with elite players covering ultra marathon distances. Instead of playing on a single field at a venue, all fields are combined into one continuous playable area. To further enhance the theme of a game, field locations may be named for important story locations, and props of various sorts are added to the game. These may be objects that players collect for points, or even vehicles that take part in the fighting, like paintball tanks. Players may don costumes specific to the theme, such as historic military uniforms or other costumes.

== Types of scenario paintball ==
These events are best broken into sub-categories.

A Big Game is a type of scenario game that revolves around territory control with very few specific tasks given to players. They may or may not have a theme. These are designed for paintball first and foremost, but sometimes feature simulations. As player density at events increases, the tactics become increasingly Napoleonic, moving principal masses of players into perceived weak points to gain territory.

A Paintball Scenario is a type of scenario game that revolves around two large sides of players performing specific tasks. These tasks at their core are designed to entertain players and encourage paint consumption by placing 2 relatively balanced teams in the same place at the same time. The tasks can be very simple such as a "take and hold" of territory on field, or very complex involving many locations, role-playing, mini games, and more. Game tasks are distributed by giving the task to an assigned commander for the team, who chooses players to carry out the task. Sometimes these tasks are simply put on a poster for all to see.

A Scenario Paintball event is an immersive gaming experience that puts the theme, story line, role-playing, and simulation experiences above the paintball play. These events feature the most players in costumes, often with a bevy of melee weapons and unique experiences. These games may include escape rooms, large numbers of props, extensive simulations, and even open-world game play features.

A Real Time Tactical event is a mixture of Big Game play and video game real-time strategy (RTS) game mechanics. Players use the event mobile app's Augmented Reality features to capture territory, build virtual structures, upgrade their forces, unlock special powers, and score points. Advanced game mechanics including capturing territory based on player GPS proximity, RGB light indicators on control points, image recognition, Heads Up Display compatibility, and AI content distribution.

A Battle Royale event plays the same as video game Battle Royales. Using the event's mobile app, players play over an increasingly shrinking playing field until only 1 person or team is left standing.

Scenario events are usually planned far in advance, both by the event "producers" or fields, and by the players themselves. Players may form large, lasting networks of players and teams that play together year after year in a specific scenario. These organizations help plan game strategy and direct their groups on the field and offer a level of organization beyond the basic two-sided team play.

Modern events may feature many different playing styles in a single weekend, featuring Battle Royale games, A Big Game, and a Paintball Scenario across 3 days.

Like all forms of paintball, scenario paintball has a very good per-capita safety record. Due to longer play times, heat-related injuries are one of the more common injuries in scenario paintball. Many players often carry 1- to 3-liter water bladders, allowing players to drink water without removing their safety masks, to combat heat and dehydration.

== Gameplay ==
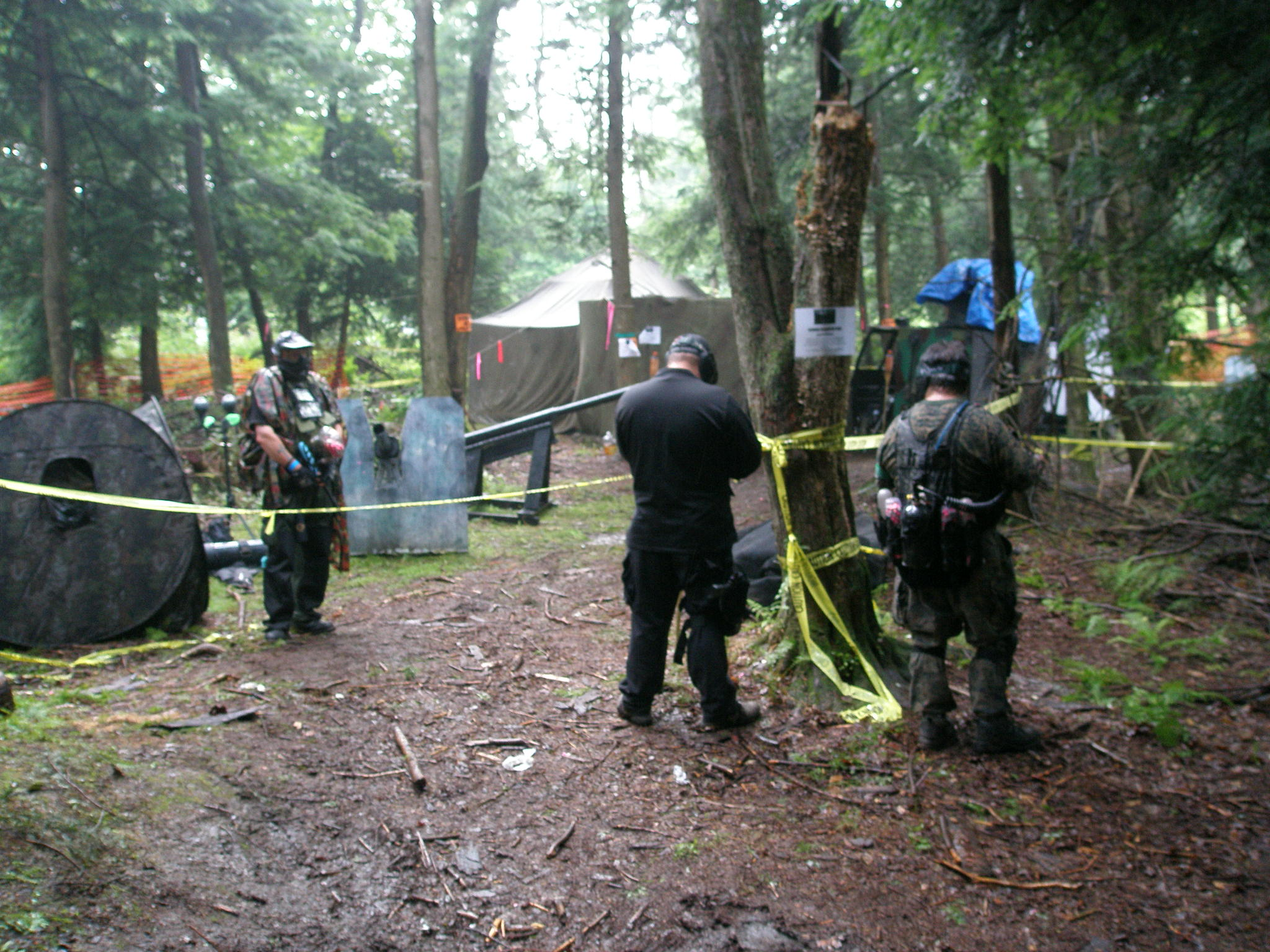
"German" team players stand ready to guard their base

Scenario paintball games allows paintball players (who may be divided into teams) to participate in a scenario, or story; which can include historical re-enactments, or fictional simulations. Because of the addition of a storyline to the game, and a larger contingent of players, scenario games tend to run over the course of hours or even days. Because of the potential size and length of matches, players tagged by paintballs, and hence eliminated, might be able to return to the playing field after a set time. The scenario itself may be punctuated by smaller rounds, in which teams may need to complete a simple objective such as holding a location while another team attacks.

=== Scenario design ===
A paintball scenario will have often have pre-planning by a director or producer and incorporate a theme - with popular simulations possibly drawn from action movies, military events, science fiction, historical events, or television shows. Games are generally designed for either single day play, which are run over an eight- to twelve-hour timespan during the daylight hours, or 24-hour play, which last for much longer and are more intricate. The entire game itself can be either one continuous match, or divided into smaller skirmishes and missions; with scoring for individual matches contributing to an overall score.

=== Player roles ===
Many scenario games add special roles to the paintball game. Some are strictly for the story line, describing the player as part of the group he or she is portraying. A player may be almost anything to fit the storyline, such as a rebel, an angry villager, a scientist or more. These roles have no effect on how the player plays.

Some roles have special game abilities that assist their team. For example, a player could be a demolitions expert, medic, pilot or spy. These roles offer the player a chance to perform additional tasks on top of shooting opposing players. For example, a medic player may be able to "heal" a certain number of teammates that have been hit by a paintball, returning them to the action that much faster.

When a player starts the game he/she is in some games issued an identification card. Some cards also indicate the player's role in the scenario. Often, players enter scenario games purely for this role-playing aspect. Players are not required to play a role in the game, but those that accept a role may be provided with specific goals to accomplish in the game.

An important aspect of role-playing scenario games is that while missions win games, role-players develop information about those missions that gain more points.

This role-playing aspect extends off the field as well, and it is common for players to be "in character" both on and off the field for the duration of the game. Role-players often negotiate with other teams for props and information, and even attempt to get opposing players to defect. For role-players, the event may start before the game as they talk with other players on internet BBS/forums, perform character research, make phone calls between teams, and assemble costumes. These pre-game activities may start weeks or months before the first paintball is fired.

=== Fields ===
Fields are normally much bigger than standard paintball fields and can even have a combined total of many paintball fields. Fields can range from a small 3 vs 3 square, to a few acres, to over 100 acres (0.40 km^{2}). Fields are generally an entire venue with every field put into use simultaneously and an out-of-bounds tape strung around it. This includes speed ball fields, castles, wooded areas, urban environments, and more.

=== Props ===
In most scenarios, props are incorporated to enhance the fun and role-playing aspects of the game. Typically these props are small, simple in make and design, clearly identifiable, and serve a specific purpose. Conventional examples would be a small wooden box, labeled “EXPLOSIVES,” or fake money used as currency between different sides during the game.

Props almost always have specific rules written about them by the scenario producers. For example, rules pertaining to the aforementioned box of explosives may specify that only specific role-players (such as demolitions, engineers, etc.) of the game may handle or operate the prop, and that if taken to the enemy base the prop may be used to “blow up” their base thus eliminating any players inside.

Some props are randomly strewn about on fields for players to find, turn in to their base, and earn their side points. Often scenario producers will write missions for each side to retrieve or defend a particular prop from a specified spot on the field. For instance, at EMR’s Castle Conquest XXI big game, in which 200 defenders defended a three-story castle against upwards of 800 attackers, the removal of any four (out of ten) props from the castle resulted in victory for the attackers.

=== Equipment ===
Not all, but many scenario players prefer military simulation, or "Mil-Sim" style gear, choosing equipment that emulates real military gear in form and function. It is not uncommon to see elaborate costumes, paintball rocket- and grenade-launchers, radios, electronic bugs, and other props built especially for the game.

Mil-Sim markers are not the only markers used. Standard paintball markers are often used, although some brightly colored models make it more difficult to remain hidden while using them.

Because players are on the field for many hours at a time, they generally pack more gear than they would in a regular woodsball game. Players may carry a large number of items, including maps, ID Cards, smoke and paint grenades, night vision systems, radios, and water. Vests emulating those worn by law enforcement and military personnel may be used. Because scenarios tend to be played in the woods or in a mix of woods and buildings, camouflage jerseys and pants are often worn.

=== Tanks ===
Paintball scenario games may include Armored Tanks the players have to interact with.

Motorized Tanks, (Heavy Armor), have specific rules which vary from field to field. A common rule is that players are not allowed within 10 feet (3.0 m) of a moving tank. Tanks are always limited to a speed of 5 mph (8.0 km/h). Tanks can be constructed from golf carts, ATVs, 6x6s or even utility vehicles that have been converted into auto based tanks which are usually quite large. Some people have even fabricated scale tanks from scratch.

=== Teams ===
There are many scenario paintball teams that attend various events throughout the world. Teams may be informal, playing for the recreational value of the scenario game, or may be more competitive. Play styles and player types vary greatly, since the pace of scenario games offers opportunities for a wide variety of athletic levels to participate.

=== Software ===
Some teams use Force Tracking and communications mobile apps. These include BattleTac, BlueFox Tracker, and RKE Warlord.

== Major events ==
- ION Skirmish in Pennsylvania every July has 4000+ players. Starts with a massive storming the beach and play continues throughout the woods and makeshift towns. Game play continues into the dark, until 10 pm.
- Oklahoma D-day in Wyandotte, Oklahoma, every June has 4000+ players. Famous for the wide variety of challenging terrain, dozens of tanks, and helicopter. June 2021 is currently scheduled as the Final D-Day.
- Fulda Gap at Command Decisions Wargame Center in Taylorsville, North Carolina host a 1500+ player game on a 70-acre field filled with multiple firebases, trench lines, towns, and bridges. Features several tanks on both sides as well as props such as simulated airstrikes, artillery, and other bombardments via pyrotechnic effects.
- NPF Bassetts Pole Adventure Park in the UK hosts the UK's longest running scenario paintball game, Diamond Wars, running since 2008.
- Skirmish Paintball in the UK host games all year round at 27 venues across Britain.
- DFW Adventure Park in Roanoke, Texas host four major games a year on 250 acres (1.0 km^{2}).
- Operation: Market Garden being the largest in Texas with about 500 players a year.

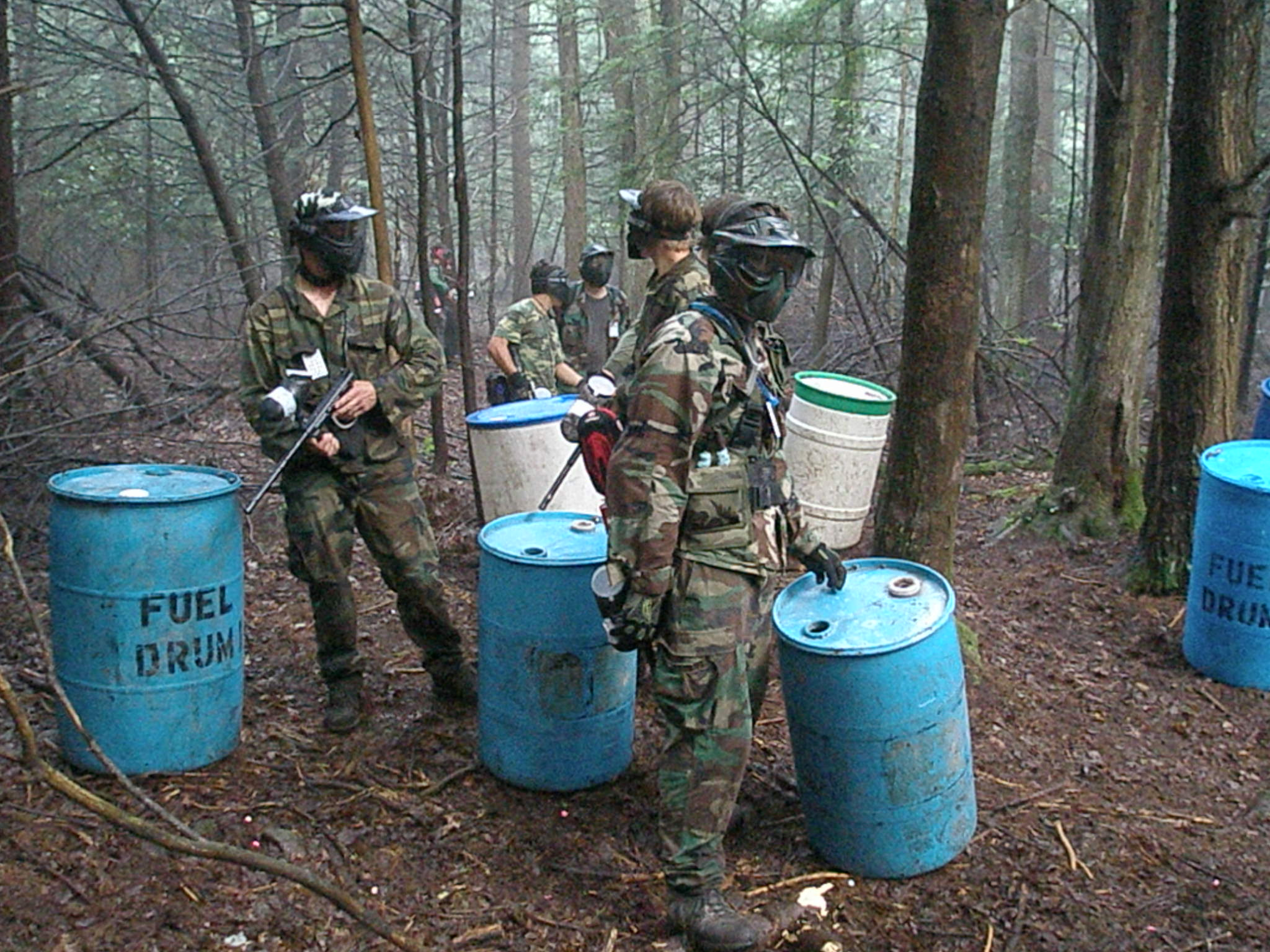
"Fuel Barrels" as props at Skirmish USA's Invasion of Normandy paintball scenario game.

- Biggame Germany: A large scenario game in Mahlwinkel, Germany, with 1500 players twice a year (June and September).
- Firefly: After The Wave, Sherwood Forest, May 2019. World's first massively multiplayer server-connected scenario game.
- Infinite War, Low Country Paintball, March 2020. World's first eSports Scenario Game.

== Big Game vs Paintball Scenario vs Scenario Paintball ==
A Big Game focuses heavily on paintball play, typically carried out in a territory control format. A paintball scenario game focuses heavily on paintball play, typically carried out in a task-based format, with the tasks designed for 2 evenly matched forces to run into each other somewhere on the field. A scenario paintball game focuses heavily on the simulation and role-playing aspects, at the expense of the paintball play. These use a wide variety of tasks for players, territory control, and other game mechanics.

== See also ==
- Speedball
- Stock class paintball
- Paintball marker
- Paintball pistol
