= Electropneumatic paintball marker =

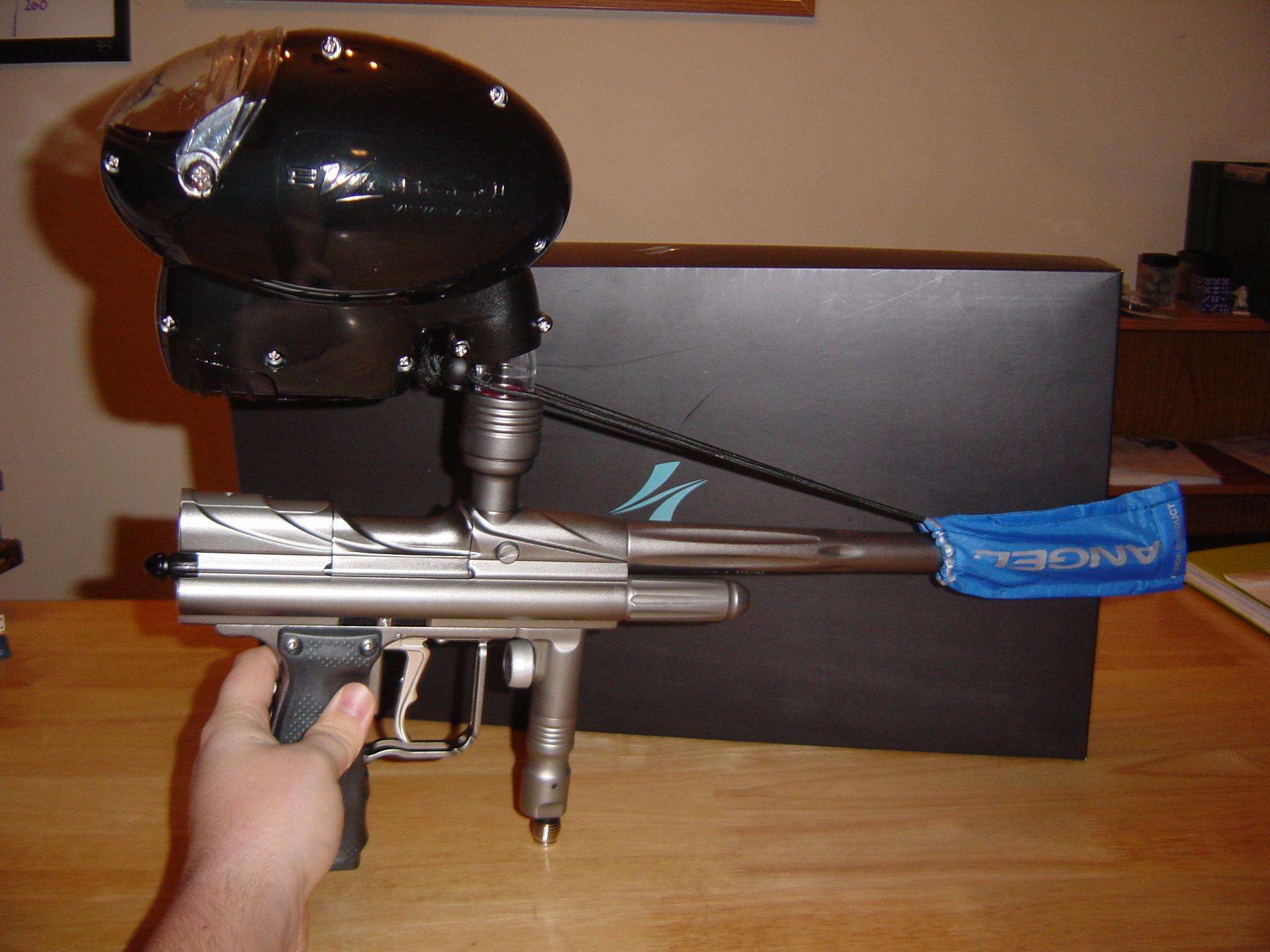
The Angel A4, a modern electropneumatic paintball marker

An electropneumatic paintball marker is a paintball marker that uses a pneumatic solenoid to actuate the hammer and/or bolt's movement.

== History and basic operation ==
The origin of the electropneumatic paintball marker is the subject of a patent dispute, but is generally acknowledged to have happened more or less simultaneously with the introduction of WDP's Angel and PneuVenture's Shocker, marketed by Smart Parts, both in 1996. The markers were operated differently; they were similar only to the extent that they both make use of one or more microswitch-controlled solenoid valves.

The Shocker used two solenoid-operated control valves in order to obtain separate controls over the ball loading sequence and the air delivery sequence. The Angel made use of a linked hammer and bolt assembly, which permitted the use of a single solenoid to actuate the entire firing sequence by controlling a piston that powered the hammer/bolt assembly forward, simultaneously chambering a paintball and releasing the propulsion gases at the end of the hammer's stroke.

The twin-solenoid arrangement of the Shocker permitted slightly lower operating pressures to be used, however the drastically simpler arrangement of the Angel provided a faster firing sequence, which ultimately proved to be favored by the players and as a result the basic operating principle behind the Angel has remained unchanged (indeed, it has even been copied many times over by a series of "stacked tube electros"), whereas the Shocker has gone through a series of revisions that culminated in a complete redesign in 2003, and now uses a single solenoid powering the increasingly popular mechanical configuration known as a "spool bolt".

It is also worth noting that while these two markers essentially tied for first electropneumatic markers to market, both designs were pre-dated (by years in some cases) by a series of homemade electropneumatic "kits" that modified pre-existing markers such as the Autococker or Sterling.

== Backlash ==
The increased availability and use of these markers also encouraged a movement that had already been chafing at the previous technology advances of paintball. These players desired a return to the days of pump markers, ten round capacity, and 12-gram CO_{2} "powerlets". The movement eventually became what is known today as "Stock-Class Paintball".

== Necessities of very fast guns ==
The Angel and the Shocker exacerbated a fundamental problem that had been brewing in the sport—as markers got quieter, with less vibration and kick, the vibration that used to keep paintballs from jamming in the hopper feedneck went away. The solution was a move to motorized loaders, most notably the ViewLoader Revolution, which used a paddle to agitate the balls whenever an infrared beam in the feedneck became uninterrupted.

However, the reality of gravity set in, and it was obvious that to satisfy the appetites of the modern marker, the loader manufacturers were going to need to force the paintballs down the feedneck faster than mere gravity would allow. As a result, modern markers now feature Empire's Reloader B2 and MagnaDrive, Dye's Rotor, ViewLoader's VLocity, Odyssey's Halo, The Q-Loader and the Draxxus Pulse systems, each feeding at rates of 22 balls-per-second or more.

== Ball detection systems ==
Two main ball-detection systems were created to ensure that a ball is present in the chamber when the player pulls the trigger. These systems were needed because, even as the loaders fed paint ever-faster into the markers, so too did the markers develop shorter firing cycles and more responsive electronics. Descriptions of the two BDS's and their subtypes follow:

=== Infrared "Eye" (Optointerrupter or Break-Beam) ===
Makes use of an infrared emitter and receiver to detect the presence of a ball based on whether or not a ball in the feed tube blocks a beam from reaching a receiver on the opposite side.

==== Reflective ====
Detects whether a ball is present based on amount of emitted light reflected back to a sensor.

=== Weight sensor ===
Detects the presence of a ball based on force applied to a rod at the base of the chamber, which converts that force to an electrical signal via a piezoelectric "pad".

==== COPS/COPS2 ====
Makes use of a rod extending up into the firing chamber and resting against the base of a chambered ball. The rod is oscillated at an extremely high frequency (imperceptible to humans) by a crystal on the control board, and when a ball falls into the chamber and hits the rod, the oscillation is affected, allowing the marker to detect when the ball is fully chambered.

==== Sensi ====
As COPS, above, but the calibration of the software to detect ball presence is automatic. Sensi incorporates an LDS (Load Detection System) that allows it to detect presence of balls further up the stack, occasionally allowing exceedingly-fast performance when it detects a full, pressured stack.

==== Noise activated ====
Using electronic "ears" hoppers will "listen" for the marker to fire and feed the next ball accordingly. This saves batteries if the hopper is left on, and since it does not require an "eye," it does not run the risk of impaired performance due to a dirty or obstructed sensor.

Although it stops excess battery use, when in an intense firefight, with nearby players, the hopper might load accidentally as the reports of other markers can deceive the sound sensor.

== See also ==
- Angel – electropneumatic paintball marker
- Dye Matrix – manufacturer of paintball equipment
- Smart Parts Ion – made by Smart Parts
- Electro-pneumatic control
