= Angel (paintball gun) =

American electropneumatic marker

- Angel A1 Fly

Specifications
- Type: Electropneumatic
- Action: Semi-Automatic with multiple preset ramping, league and custom modes.
- Barrel: 14 inches. Carbon fiber tip.
- Bore: Multi-bore kit - .691, .693, .695
- Rate of fire: 30+ balls per second

The Angel is one of the first electropneumatic paintball markers. It was manufactured by Angel Paintball Sports (originally WDP) starting in 1997 and was introduced alongside Smart Parts' original Shocker.

The Angel was initially distributed in the United States by Brass Eagle as the 1455 Angel Semi-auto, advertised with a rate of 15 balls per second. This deal was short-lived, so WDP then distributed the Angel independently; refining the marker and releasing new models.

== History ==
The Angel paintball marker was designed by engineer John Rice, as an HPA-only marker. Despite its ubiquitous use in the sport at the time, Rice considered CO_{2} a dirty gas, so the Angel used miniaturized components that could not withstand impurities in the air or the cooling effects of CO_{2}. To cater to the sudden need for a high-flow HPA regulator, WDP released the Gov'nair high pressure air system. The marker featured an electronic firing sequence and light trigger for effective shooting, and low learning curve. The first use of the Angel in a NPPL event was at the 1996 World Cup by Ted Kunewa with Washington Reign and Jacko with Banzai Bandits.

== Operation ==
The Angel incorporates a linked bolt and hammer, tri-tubed design, and a four-way solenoid valve, referred to as a fourteen-way by Angel engineer Rice. The valve drives the ram and is essentially an electronically controlled version of the four-way valves mounted to the front block of Autococker markers.

The firing sequence is electronically controlled, and starts from the open bolt. At the pull of the trigger, an electronic impulse trips the four-way valve, pushing compressed gas through the ram from behind, forcing the ram and bolt assembly to move towards the valve, impacting the poppet and releasing gas to the chamber. The paintball is fired with this gas, then the four-way solenoid reverses, and delivers gas to the front of the ram, returning the ram and bolt assembly to their starting position.

== Design evolution ==
Major Design Revisions (in chronological order of release):
Model	Comment
Angel v6	Pre-production prototype. The signature "rotobreech" on this model was unique in that it opened from the opposite side versus all later models.
Angel	Known today as the "Angel LED" to differentiate it from the subsequent Angel models which use an LCD programming interface
Angel LCD	
Angel 2K2	Slight design change. The electronic board was much more advanced and included several other modes of fire and an increased rate of fire.
Angel IR3	Shares many of the same features as an LCD but in a slightly shorter overall package. The ram assembly overall is a bit shorter. Changed grip to 90-degree angle and a large trigger/hand guard. Also the first model to incorporate the COPS ("Crystal-Operated Paint Sensor") anti-chop ball detection system. Named for the inclusion of an IR port on the board, used for programming and for syncing settings between team members' markers.
Angel Speed 03 "3PEED"	Introduced the low pressure, or "LP" platform. First angel since LED to have a non LCD readout. The 03 model was released with the HP model solenoid but the new battery couldn't provide a reliable power source and was revised for 04 with a different solenoid to correct this problem. Introduced "Sensi" (an upgrade to the COPS software that could detect not just a paintball in the ready-to-fire position, but additional paintballs up the feedneck).
Angel Speed 04 "4PEED"	Revised version of the 03 Speed with a new solenoid to correct the "shoot down" issue caused by the previous solenoid.
Angel 4	First LP-platform marker with the traditional LCD interface. Also introduced vernier trigger adjustment wheels.
Angel 4 Fly	Switched from the COPS/Sensi piezoelectric sensor with break-beam anti-chop eyes
Angel Speed 2005 "5PEED"	First model to use a 9V battery. Uses a new LPR/Volumiser system as well as a new bolt, ram and frame design.
Angel G7	New valve style and LPR system introduced.
Angel G7 Fly	barrel threading change to smaller threads and shaft. Also adds a new key turn style rotobreech instead of the old pull-and-turn style
Angel Speed 2006 "6PEED"	Improved valve system, shot chamber, and bolt. First Angels to be able to use a no-rise (PL models) or low-rise feednecks.
Angel One	barrel threading changes again, G7 Fly/06 Speed threads are still compatible, also first Angel to use an OLED display with a blackberry style control wheel for fast board adjustments. Stock circuit board also has USB port for updates. Current software is 2.7. Major changes to body design and a new frame style. First and only model to be made in China.
Angel One Fly	Stock with Sly carbon fiber tip, "Fly Paper" grip inserts, standard threaded Vertical Regulator adapter, Magno valve which uses magnets instead of a spring to close the valve. Comes stock with kiss bolt (Soft tip bolt, compatible with kiss software to be gentle on paint) and the Magno ram as well as the Magno exhaust valve stem. All major upgrades designed for A1 based markers. Naturally quieter, more efficient and more consistent than the A1, also is compared to high-end spool valves in terms of quietness and smoothness while shooting.
Angel AR:K/SB	Tactical Angel marker with APEX compatible barrel tip as well as picatinny rail mounts. The Angel SB is literally identical to the AR:K minus the tactical accessories and rail. Both markers feature a newly designed color OLED board, a fully enclosed firing chamber, a new Valve system dubbed the D-LITE stem which was lighter than the original steel magno valve not to mention self lubricating, New ST:R Ram which was lighter and slightly tougher than the original Magno Ram, new cobra trigger styles (which utilized a micro switch), and some minor revisions internally over the A1 Fly including a new MOJO board. super efficient 2000+ rds from a 68/4500
Angel Fly SE	An Angel A1 Fly with SB parts and extended warranty.
