= Paintball tank =

Vehicle used in the shooting sport of paintball

The Special Ops Razorback is an example of a paintball tank built on the chassis of an Israeli Fast Attack Vehicle; note the turret on the rear, the central air system on the hood, and the gun ports in the side windows.

A paintball tank, also known as a paintball armoured vehicle (PAV) is a vehicle, or a portable structure that resembles a vehicle, sometimes used in the sport of paintball, usually with the intent of military simulation. The purpose of the tank is to provide a mobile shelter for one or several players, from which they may employ their markers against players on the opposing team. Small pneumatic guns, effectively low-powered potato cannons loaded with foam darts, are also often employed against other tanks.

Paintball tanks are commonly used for woodsball and scenario paintball games, and similar designs have also seen use in Airsoft scenario games, with varying degrees of similarity to a true tank.

== Types and construction ==
Although the method of propulsion, crew size, physical dimensions and weight, and the number and location of "weapons", all vary depending on tank type, all tanks share some common features:

=== General construction ===
Apart from the most spartan of automobile conversions (replacing the windows with netting and calling it a day), tanks typically feature a superstructure/casemate assembled from thin sheets of paintball-proof material such as laminated cardboard, plywood, fiberglass, or sheet metal. attached to the vehicle's frame in place of some or all of the normal body paneling. If a suitable structural member is not available, a custom frame, typically built from PVC or ABS pipe, wood, or steel tubing, may be built off of the existing structure. In the case of scratch-built tanks, the entire "chassi" may be built this way.

The tank's armament usually includes at least one paintball marker, and may include a low-velocity potato cannon loaded with foam projectiles for use against enemy tanks. Rules permitting, the main cannon may also be used against buildings occupied by opposing players, and some tanks have been demonstrated firing canister shot consisting of several paintballs between two paper wads, or contained within a flimsy paper/foam sabot, to be used against players on open ground.

=== Type classifications ===
Because of the great variety in physical characteristics and functionality between vehicles, even those made by the same builder, tanks are type classified according to their propulsion method. A tank's type classification may or may not be indicative of the tank's physical size or weight, crew size, or other capabilities. For example, automobile-based designs are usually the largest because of the dimensions of the vehicle they were built on.

Some event producers may provide additional temporary classifications depending on physical size, crew size, or armament layout, such as Light Tank, Heavy Tank, or Tank Destroyer. Such event-specific classifications may have an associated ruleset for how the vehicle is allowed to navigate the play area, and what effort must be undertaken by the opposing team in order to defeat it.

A Funtrak Panzer. It may or may not qualify as a scratch-built tank because of its mass-produced nature

==== Scratch-built ====
Because these tanks are fully custom-built, their designs vary widely, making this group the most diverse category of paintball tanks.

- Walking tanks are generally built for smaller scenarios and fields. Technically a suit of body armour rather than a vehicle, walking tanks are the most common type. Weight concerns usually limit their armament to a pair of paintball markers, and occasionally a pneumatic gun. While perhaps lacking in visual impact, walking tanks can be cheap, and easily transported, while providing much the same benefit as more complex design. Walking tanks have been commonly referred to as PUGs after one builder produced what he called a Panzer Ultraleicht Gepack (very light backpack armor) constructed using a military backpack as a base.
- Carry-along tanks are multiple-occupant walking tanks or Flintstone tanks without wheels, and are carried around on the field by their crew whenever movement is desired. These designs sacrifice either structural durability, armament, ammunition, crew comfort, or a combination of these, for increased off-road mobility when compared to a Flintstone tank. They commonly have several firing ports in the walls of their hull, and a pneumatic anti-tank gun may be attached to the tank, or carried by a crewman.
- Flintstone tanks, also known as "push tanks", are multiple-occupant bunkers on bicycle or trolley-type wheels. As the name suggests, they are moved around by the crew grabbing a hold of the tank's interior and pushing it in a desired direction. Although generally poorly suited to uneven terrain, they can be fitted with heavier equipment than a walking tank, including manned turrets.
- Motorized scratchbuilt tanks can be of virtually any size and internal layout, although most are fairly small. Some are designed as scale replicas of historical or modern tank designs, others for performance. They're generally built on wood or tube-frame chassis, and powered by a small industrial engine. Some of the more involved versions feature working tracks and motorized turrets.

==== ATV-based tanks ====
ATV-based tanks are ATVs fitted with weapons and protective coverings. The level of involvement varies here as well; some are simply quads or similar fitted with a removable netting cage, others feature scratch-built bodies and turrets and are capable of housing several players and their equipment. All-terrain vehicles, Golf carts, riding mowers and amphibious ATVs are the most popular bases for ATV tanks, thanks to ready availability, off-road ability and low price.

==== Automobile-based tanks ====
Automobile-based tanks are modifications to existing automobiles; ranging from minivans with firing ports and windows replaced by netting to near-replica vehicles featuring completely new bodies. The most common base vehicles are SUVs, Jeeps and trucks due to low cost and availability, although their high ground clearance and four-wheel drive is also helpful given poor conditions of many trails and roads in paintball fields. Minivans are also a common sight.

== Rules and game involvement ==
While paintball has standardized (and very strict) safety rules relating to markers, masks, and other equipment used by players, putting those players, their markers and masks, and additional equipment in an enclosed vehicle (motorized or not) creates additional safety concerns. The following is an aggregate of rules which may or may not all be in use at the same time at any particular field.

=== Defence ===
One of the most important aspects of paintball vehicle design is the prevention of enemy players "painting", and thus eliminating, the occupants of the vehicle. Depending on its design, a vehicle may offer incidental, partial, or complete paint protection for its crew, but the vehicle itself is typically vulnerable to certain types of "anti-tank" weaponry.

- Markers:
  - Occupants may be eliminated according to normal infantry rules.
  - Drivers may be considered a part of the vehicle. If this is the case, eliminating the driver will simply trigger a "disabled" status, requiring a medic to "heal" the vehicle. If the driver is considered separate from the vehicle, another occupant (with the necessary qualifications) must replace them.
  - Unprotected vehicles can be eliminated with a sufficient amount of hits from a paintball marker. To prevent this, vehicles are typically fitted with a plywood or OSB sheet bodywork to protect their engine and crew/passenger compartments, thus converting them to an armoured car or armoured truck, although weight concerns may restrict both Carry-along tanks and Flintstone tanks to light materials such as laminated cardboard panels, foam, fiberglass, stretched cloth, or netting. PUGs, effectively being suits of armour rather than vehicles, suffer in particular from the weight of their protective measures.
  - Armoured cars and armoured trucks are typically more resilient, if not outright immune to maint, but can still be immobilized by painting their wheels.
  - Tanks are immune to paint.
- "Paint grenades":
  - Unprotected vehicles may or may not be instantly eliminated, depending on the local field rules.
  - Armoured cars, armoured trucks, and tanks, cannot be eliminated by throwing a grenade at windows or mesh screens, but a grenade that makes its way into the interior of the vehicle will eliminate all occupants in the affected compartment.
- "AT mines and satchel charges":
  - Unprotected vehicles will be instantly eliminated.
  - Armored cars and armoured trucks may be instantly eliminated, or may simply be disabled in the same way as would a tank.
  - Tanks will be immobilized until a driver or other player with the proper "role card" has performed a "repair ritual". The ritual can only be performed from outside the vehicle, exposing the impromptu repairman to the opposing team's paint, orleaving the vehicle stranded until the immediate surroundings have been secured. Repeated mine strikes may or may not eventually eliminate a tank, depending on the local field rules.
- Bazookas (low-velocity potato cannons firing foam darts or other soft-ish projectiles):
  - Unprotected vehicles are instantly eliminated.
  - Armoured cars and armoured trucks may require two hits to be eliminated. The first hit starts an "on fire" timer which, if allowed to run out, eliminates the vehicle and any occupants who have not yet dismounted at that time. A second hit on an "on fire" vehicle causes an instant elimination of the vehicle and occupants.
  - Tanks can be eliminated, though rules vary between fields and scenarios as to how many hits are required, and some fields consider different parts of the tank as having different levels of protection. For example, a single hit might be enough to eliminate a tank with a shot to the rear, while two hits are required when hitting the sides. The front may or may not be considered as entirely immune to handheld AT weapons).
- Tank/antitank guns (Similar to the handheld launchers, but attached to a vehicle or "gun carriage"):
  - Tanks can be eliminated from any direction, though the number of hits required may vary depending on what parts of the tank are hit.

As an alternative to the methods described above, some fields may use "paint boxes"; sets of plates (typically plywood or OSB) attached to the front, sides, and rear of the vehicle, which must be entirely covered with paint in order for the vehicle to be eliminated. Other options include "hoops" into which the opposing team must launch their AT projectiles to score hits against the vehicle.

=== Offense ===
- Cannons have a maximum permissible muzzle velocity. Rules may also apply to how the pressurized air is stored.
- The driver of a motorized tank may be equipped with a marker, but may only use it when the tank is stationary, and the engine is turned off.
- If the field allows the use of a vehicle's main gun against buildings and bunkers housing players from the opposing team, only hits to the outer walls of the building are counted. This is to disincentivize lobbing shots in through windows, as a high-speed foam dart may carry enough energy to knock off masks.
- Fields may standardize cannon and AT rocket ammunition, in which case non-standard ammunition may be banned if the field owner considers it less safe than their preferred types. The following is a list of common ammunition types:
  - AP shot: A foam dart up to the size of a Nerf vortex dart. 40 mm TAGinn pyro rounds are sometimes used. 37 mm soft and fragile shots with marking powder do appear as well. This is the most common type of ammunition.
  - Canister: A foam or paper cartridge holding several paintballs which separate upon leaving the cannon barrel. Incredibly inaccurate, but useful as a psychological weapon because of the high probability of hitting something, somewhere.
  - HE shell: A foam or paper cartridge, repurposed water balloon filled with powder and/or paintballs, or colored powder-filled shots with simulated kill radius. Unlike foam darts, these shells are unlikely to go unnoticed as they burst on impact.
  - Smoke: A fragile bag of powder, typically flour. Bursts upon firing and creates a visual obstruction. Smaller smoke launchers may also be mounted on the hull or turret to produce an arc of smoke around the vehicle.
- A tank's markers should be semi-automatic. One trigger pull: one paintball.
- The number of paintball markers mounted on tanks may or may not be limited, but the muzzle velocity of the markers themselves are limited for reasons of safety (use of excessively high rates of fire may also be considered unsportsmanlike conduct).
- Standard barrel cover rules apply when off the field, but vehicles do not need to mount the barrel covers when eliminated, as doing so would require climbing around the outside of the vehicle during movement, which is one of the most dangerous thinks you can do around a paintball vehicle
- The amount of ammunition carried in the vehicle may be limited based on how many markers are fitted onto the vehicle, or the number of occupants, or some other metric.

=== Movement ===
- Speed limits are generally considered among the more important rules, especially for motorized vehicles. It is a common rule to restrict vehicles to 8 km/h, 5 mph, or "Walking speed" on the field.
- Motorized tanks may be limited to travelling on roads. What is or is not considered a road is determined by the owner of the field.
- Vehicles are required to have working brakes (PUGs and carry-along designs get away with "not walking" and "putting the thing back on the ground")

=== Situational Awareness ===
- Vehicles must provide their driver with an "adequate" forward field of vision. This can be vaguely interpreted to mean straight ahead, and at least 60 degrees to the left and right, respectively. Downward visibility should be such that when looking straight ahead, the distance from the front of the vehicle to the closest visible point on the ground should not exceed the length of the vehicle.
- Functional Head and tail-lights are required for nighttime operations.
- Vehicles are required to have a "Tank Walker"; a referee who walks next to the vehicle and enforces player proximity restrictions, alerts the driver if a player is at risk of being run over, points out terrain obstacles, informs the crew when their vehicle is hit by enemy antitank weapons and inform enemy vehicles and bunkers when they have been hit. Walkers are however not allowed to point out targets to the vehicle's crew, and as implied by their referee status, do not carry any weapons of their own.
- Since the crew's arm bands or other team identifiers are not typically visible to players outside the vehicle, the vehicle itself must also carry team identifiers. These come in two varieties, the first being markings placed on either side of the vehicle, preferably on a turret, and a marking on the front of the hull, the height and width of these markings being no less than 8" or 20 cm, at least 25% of the vertical height of whichever surface they're mounted or painted onto, and at least 12,5% of the height of the vehicle from the ground up to the roof of the hull or turret (whichever is higher). The second option is to fly a 2' by 3' team flag* on top of the vehicle to be visible from all directions.
- Vehicles must fly a white 2' x 3' flag* to indicate their eliminated status while travelling back to a reinsertion point.
- A tank may be required to have a functioning radio transmitter/receiver to facilitate communication between driver and Tank Walker.
- If rules do not prohibit players from approaching an immobile tank, motorized tanks must sound a horn before starting the engine, and must wait for the walker to give an all-clear signal.

*Some fields allow smaller 2' x 2' flags.

=== Infantry Interaction ===
- Players may not be allowed to be closer than 4,5 - 6m (15 - 20 ft) from a motorized vehicle. Sometimes this rule only applies to moving vehicles. Sometimes it applies to everything except PUGs, Carry-along, and Flintstone tanks.
- Players are not allowed to climb onto, into, or out of the vehicle during movement.
- Tank Storming; forced entry into the vehicle to assault the crew rather than the vehicle itself, is typically forbidden. Actions that constitute tank storming includes, but is not limited to: Inserting a marker into the vehicle and painting the occupants; Pulling open hatches and doors and tossing smoke grenades into the interior of a fully enclosed vehicle. While paintball is generally physically demanding, vehicles are sometimes used as an alternative by the not-entirely-able-bodied, and some occupants may have difficulties climbing into or out of a vehicle unassisted, even when it's standing on even ground and isn't filled with smoke.

=== In case of Emergency ===
- The tank's construction must be structurally sound. Although technically vague, this rule may be generally understood as "If the vehicle was to flip onto its side, the hull and chassis should not separate or collapse". Additionally, Batteries, air tanks, ammunition containers, and so forth, should be strapped, bolted, or otherwise physically attached to the vehicle, and electrical wiring should be kept neat and tidy and out of the way to prevent entanglement.
- Motorized tanks must carry a (non-expired) fire extinguisher.
- Motorized tanks must have a Big Red Button mounted in an easily accessible location on their hull to allow anybody to disable the tank's engine and electronics if the driver is incapacitated. A similar feature should be present inside the tank if the internal arrangement of the vehicle is such that other members of the crew cannot easily reach past the driver to pull the ignition key and/or handbrake.
- First Aid kits aren't typically required, but can sometimes be found on motorized tanks if their builders find the spare room, in the off chance that they have to pull double duty as medical transports. Accidents do happen from time to time when playing in the outdoors, after all, and it can be a long walk to the edge of the field.

== Tankball ==
Tankball is a vehicle-only variation of paintball. It is a fairly expensive mode of play, and is therefore far less common. The basic form involves vehicles driving around the field, firing paintball buckshot, or Nerf Rockets at one another.

Depending on the exact design of the vehicles involved (specifically the protective qualities of their "armour", and the exclusive use of periscopes to provide vision), tankball may allow for the use of higher-powered cannons, firing denser projectiles at higher velocities (on the condition that all vehicles are driven with the hatches closed while on the field). The absence of infantry on the field, and the high-density, high-velocity projectiles, allow for faster vehicle movement and more realistic engagement ranges.

Although tankball is somewhat common on regular woodsball fields (using regular paintball vehicles and their standard equipment), the world's so far only purpose-made tankball field is located in Leicestershire, England. A small fleet of tanks (actually FV432 Armoured Personnel Carriers) are available for rental, fitted with cannons of the high-powered variety (firing 40mm diameter paint-filled pingpong balls). As previously mentioned, closed-hatch operation is mandatory as these super-sized paintballs have too much kinetic energy to safely impact unprotected persons.
