= Paintball variations =

Ways of playing paintball

Paintball is played with a potentially limitless variety of rules and variations, all of which are specified before the game begins. The most basic of all game rules is that players must attempt to accomplish a goal without being tagged with paintballs. Generally, paintball is divided into either its original incarnation woodsball, or the small arena-based and tournament de facto speedball. Amongst these paintball game types, variations of basic rules can be played.

== Stock paintball ==
Stock Paintball is based on the original technology of the 1980s. A player uses a pump action paintball marker, which requires a pumping movement after each shot to reload, and must adhere to the following rules:

- The marker must have a horizontal paintball feed - the marker must be tilted (rocked) forward or backward to feed the next shot.
- The marker may not be semi-automatic - it requires pumping or cocking prior to each shot being fired (in other words "rock and cock").
- The marker must be powered by a single 12 gram powerlet - limiting the number of shots to 15 to 40 depending on the efficiency of the marker.
- The marker may only hold a maximum of 20 paintballs inside the feed tube.

== Basic variations ==
- Elimination or Slayer - Teams or individual players must simply eliminate all of their opponents by marking them with a paintball. Most games with a different primary goal, such as capture the flag, use this as a secondary winning condition.
- Capture the Flag - When paintball was first started in 1981, the very first game played was a round of capture the flag with twelve people divided into two teams. Each team must take the flag from the opponents' flag station and return it to their own station to win (a common variant).
- Center Flag - Similar to Capture the Flag except there is a single flag placed in the center of the field, and each team's objective is to take that flag either back to their own starting station or across the field to their opponents' station.
- King of the Hill - Players attempt to capture and hold one or more bases. These bases may be arranged in a path, and to capture one the team must control all previous bases along the path, or the bases may be distributed throughout the field of play with any one of them up for grabs at any given time. "Reinforcements" are common in these games as it is otherwise unlikely any one team will capture all bases without completely eliminating the other side.
- Attack/Defend - One team is given an advantageous defensive position, such as a cluster of bunkers, advantageous terrain such as a hilltop, or a pre-built fortification, within which they must defend some critical goal point. The other team is given unlimited reinforcements, and must reach the goal point in as short a time as possible. Teams then switch sides and the now-attacking team must beat the previous team's time to reach the goal. Related attack-and-defend games can be played with uneven teams as military scenarios.
- Reinforcements/resurrections - Not a game format by itself, but common in recreational and scenario games, this rule variant allows one or more eliminated players of one or more teams to re-enter the game after being eliminated. The simplest form is when a group has an odd number of players; instead of having a player sit out, the team with one fewer player gets one "resurrection"; the first player eliminated may simply go back to his team's starting point, touch it, and re-enter the game as the team's "missing man". "Reinforcements" are commonly used in more structured variants like scenario play, and allow groups of eliminated players from both teams to re-enter the game at specified time intervals.
  - Jail tag is a full game variant based on the similar kid's game, in which players who are eliminated go to a "jail" area, and players still in the game can "rescue" a player from jail by touching them with their hand, and bring them back into the game as a "reinforcement".
- Vampire, Predator, Terminator, Zombie - A common family of variations derived from simple "elimination" games, players split into two uneven teams. Depending on the variant, the team with fewer players is given some advantage reducing that team's ability to be eliminated from the game. "Vampires", for instance, may turn players from the other "Hunter" team into Vampire players by shooting them. "Terminators" or "Predators" may require a hit in a certain area, such as the facemask, to be eliminated, while other hits don't count. "Zombies" may have both advantages and disadvantages; they may require multiple hits and be able to convert players from the other team, but may also have a disadvantage such as being required to walk, or to "convert" players by tapping them with the barrel instead of marking them with a paintball.
- Scenarios - Players split into teams according to the specific scenario, usually modeled on some real-world police, military or security situation. A common scenario game is "VIP"; one player of one team represents the VIP (they may be armed or unarmed), and the goal of the rest of that player's team is to get the VIP across the field without being eliminated, while the goal of the entire opposing team is to eliminate the VIP. The team protecting the VIP may have some advantage such as "body armor" (multiple hits may be required, or members of that team may simply not be able to be eliminated, allowing players to use themselves to "shield" the VIP). Other scenarios generally fall into the "attack & defend" category, where even or uneven teams compete to invade and oppositely defend a specific fortification on a field. Paintball equipment can be used in police scenario simulation like hostage standoffs, bank robberies, etc., and many paintball parks offer fields that can be used for this purpose; however, most real training along these lines is done with different equipment such as Airsoft, laser-based equipment or modified real-world weapons such as those that use Simunition. The use of paintball fields and equipment for scenario play has been the cause of suspicion by law enforcement; see Paintball - Accused terrorist usage.
- Common Foe - Commonly used when supplies and/or player staminas are low or total player count is high, this format pits individual players or small teams against each other in an open-ended game format allowing extended rest time and reduced paint usage. The basic idea is to start with a normal elimination game played between two even teams, A and B. A third team of equal force, C, stays on the sidelines. When the total number of eliminated players between A and B equals the strength of team C, that team enters the game against the remaining players of A and B, which now turn to fight the "common foe". The eliminated players from A and B form a new sideline team, D, which enters the game when the bench of eliminated players fills up again. Play continues in this fashion, with surviving members of all previous teams allying against each new team entering from the sidelines, until either a prescribed number of new teams has entered, or until the majority of eliminated players have insufficient paint, air or stamina to rejoin the game as a new team. The "winning" players are either the ones who have been eliminated the fewest times, as indicated by tally marks on their hands made by a sideline ref each time they hit the bench, or alternately, the surviving members of the "oldest" team still in play win, as evidenced by letters written on their hand.

== Tournament formats ==
Tournaments may be played with teams of various sizes. 20-man and 15-man tournaments were common on wooded fields in the 1980s, and professional paintball teams played 10-man for most of the 90's and into the new millennium

Today, tournament paintball is dominated by 3-6 "small", 6-9 "med", and 9-12 member "large" formats. In most tournament formats, teams play a set of games against various opponents. Teams earn points for each game, with the most points awarded for capturing and hanging the flag, but some also awarded for opponents eliminated and teammates left alive at the end of the game.

- Capture the Flag - The original tournament format, woodsball tournaments of any size are commonly capture the flag format, as well as most 3-man or 6-man speedball tournaments, but may also be used with other team sizes. The game starts with a flag at each team's starting station, and the team to capture their opponent's flag and return it to their starting station wins. The National Professional Paintball League plays a 7-man capture the flag format, which was used in the NPPL US Paintball Championship (NPPL Commander's Cup 2005 in Miami) broadcast on ESPN2 in the spring of 2006. 7-man capture the flag is also played by regional tournament series like the Xtreme Paintball Sports League and the New England Paintball League.
- Centerflag - The two flags of capture the flag are replaced by one flag located at the center of the field. The first team to take this flag to the opposing team's starting station wins the game. 6-man, 9-man and some 12-man competitions primarily use the centerflag format. Paintball Sports Promotions, a national circuit, offers 5-man centerflag divisions in addition to XBall.
- XBall - A newer format first played at the International Amateur Open in 2002, XBall pits two teams against each other in multiple rounds of Center Flag played one after another until game time runs out. A team scores one point for each game of centerflag they win, and the team with the most points at the end of the match wins. Professional XBall matches are 50 minutes long, split into two halves, while non-professional matches use various shorter game times. Although only 5 or 7 players per team play in any given game, depending on league rules, teams may roster up to 19 players and substitute them after each point. Unlike most tournament formats that forbid players to communicate with people on the sidelines, XBall teams have a coach who can communicate, along with the spectators, with players on the field. Players who receive penalties are not permanently removed from the game, but placed in a hockey-like penalty box for several minutes. The National XBall League, a professional circuit associated with Paintball Sports Promotions, plays the XBall format, which was also used for the Smart Parts World Paintball Championships broadcast on ESPN2 in the fall of 2006.
- Race To - Like XBall, but only has one period, typically 20 minutes long. The first team to reach a set point total (commonly 5 or 7 points), or the team with the highest point total after game time has elapsed, wins the match. Race To is offered by Paintball Sports Promotions as well as regional series like the Playground Paintball League (PGPL).

== See also ==
- Scenario paintball

== Notes ==
- Smith and Young (2007). Paintballer's Almanac Vol. 1. Lulu Press. ISBN 1-4303-0730-7.
- Malensek (2002). 50+ Ways to Play with Your Paintballs. Infinity Publishing. ISBN 0-7414-1105-9.
