= WDP (company) =

WDP PAINTBALL LTD owns and operates NPF Bassetts Pole Adventure Park, a paintball site / adventure park in Birmingham., England. The company WDP is also known for manufacturing the Angel line of electropneumatic paintball markers.

== History ==
WDP began operating in 1987 with the opening of National Paintball Fields paintball site. Once the field became successful, the company opened a shop and began running paintball tournaments in order to stimulate local demand for paintball equipment. Not content with woodland tournament play, WDP pioneered the "arena" paintball concept, introducing what would be called "Hyperball" - a speedball arena field constructed from corrugated plastic pipe and designed for a much faster game format.

The first product introduced by the company was the Mamba Remote Coil hose - a coiled high pressure air line for connecting high pressure air and CO_{2} gas systems to paintball markers remotely.

Development of the Angel paintball marker began when engineer John Rice began working with the company in 1994. The marker would remain in development for a further three years before being publicly released. The Angel introduced electronically controlled paintball markers to the industry and ushered in a new and unprecedented level of marker firing speed in paintball.

In 2007 WDP began using the trading name Angel Paintball Sports (APS) and internally restructured. During this restructuring, long-time sales manager Owen Ronayne departed from the company. Technician Frazer Colley has been promoted from within the company to become Technical and Team Sponsorship Manager and will be working more closely with US Master Tech Robert "PI" Moon and Mark Costa to provide technical support and service. Matt Green, previously WDP's head of sales, is the new managing director and chief executive officer at Angel headquarters. Bart Walkerdine joins Matt as president and chief operating officer.

As of November 2011 Angel Paintball Sports has ceased operation.

As of January 2014 National Paintball Fields rebranded under the name of NPF Bassetts Pole Adventure Park. NPF Bassetts Pole Adventure Park is now a multi activity venue providing paintball, airsoft, quad trekking, a shooting range, axe throwing, inflatable assault courses and gladiator type dueling games, laser combat, bushcraft courses, and event management for corporate events.
