= Skirmish Paintball =

Paintball arena company

Skirmish Paintball Official Logo (2010)

Skirmish Paintball is a paintball arena company in the United Kingdom, Ireland, and Australia. Paintball venues operated under the Skirmish trademark are privately owned.

== General ==
Skirmish Paintball UK was founded in 1984, and celebrated their 25-year anniversary in 2009. The company runs 27 sites in the UK, all belonging to the UK Paintball Sports Federation (UKPSF). Skirmish Paintball is open to play for anyone aged over 11, and caters to group bookings - including bachelor or bachelorette parties, corporate, school or college events.

Skirmish Paintball sites allow players to hire equipment such as camouflage suits, or pyrotechnics - including simulated hand grenades and smoke bombs. Several sites across the UK also provide both Laser tag and Airsoft facilities, playable in the same paintball arenas already existing on the sites - along with rental of related playing gear.

== History ==
The Skirmish paintball name was originally trademarked by Kit Peters, Martin & Simon Peniston-Bird, and as the brand name got bigger, the license fee for the rights of the name "Skirmish" is now purchased individually by the private owners of the separate Skirmish sites across the UK.

== UK locations ==
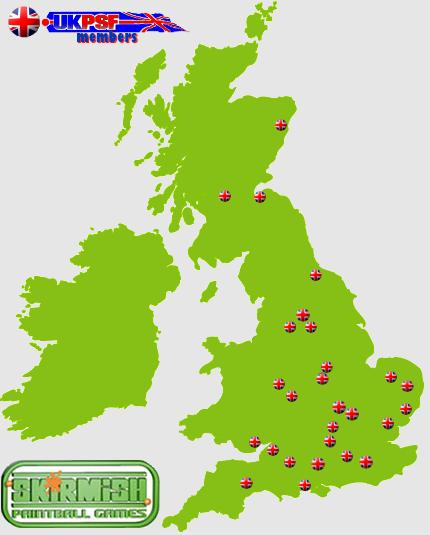
Skirmish Paintball UK Locations (2010)

- Aberdeen
- Bristol
- Brighouse
- Basingstoke
- Birmingham
- Buckingham
- Cardiff
- Cobham
- Crawley
- Dorset
- Edinburgh
- Essex
- Exeter (granted a bronze medal in the Green Tourism awards in 2007)
- Glasgow
- High Wycombe
- Ipswich
- Leicester
- Leeds
- Northampton
- Nottingham
- Norfolk
- Norwich
- Wakefield
- Wolverhampton
- Warminster

== Pyrotechnics ==
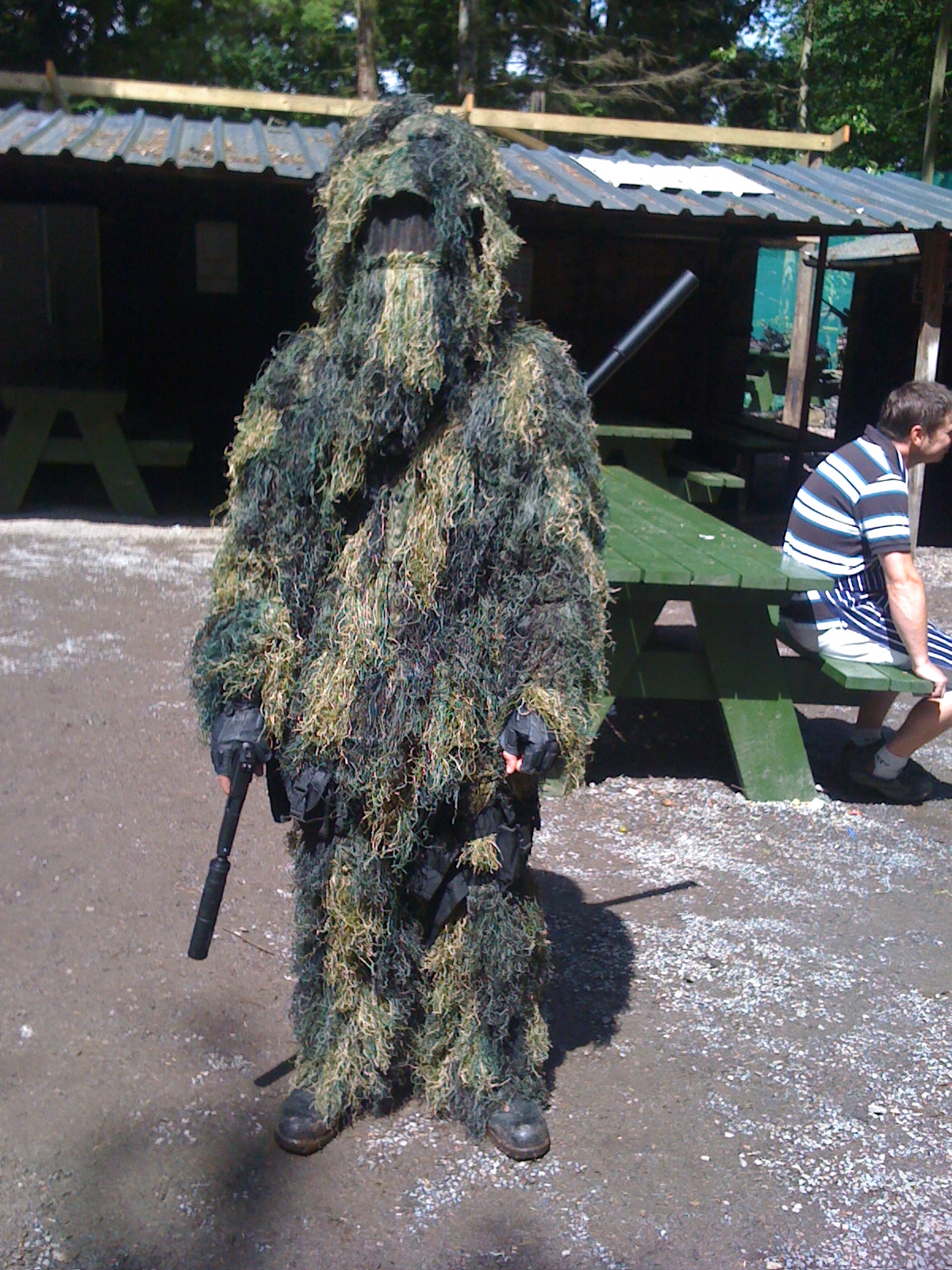
Skirmish Exeter Airsoft player in full gear, with sniper rifle and silenced pistol

Pyrotechnics that can be purchased from a Skirmish Paintball site are hand grenades and Smoke bombs, with some also providing flash bangs.

- Hand Grenades
  - Hand Grenades are constructed using a cardboard shell, with a fuse inside that has 20-25 paintballs around the center. To light the fuse, you must tear off the cap, and use the reverse side, which resembles the side of a matchbox to spark the fuse. When the fuse is lit, there is an approximate 5 seconds before the grenade shatters and explodes, firing coloured paint in all directions.
- Smoke Bombs
  - Smoke Bombs use the same lighting technology as the hand grenade, with a reverse side to the cap which you must strike against the fuse. When a smoke bomb is lit, it releases coloured smoke for about 2 minutes, to provide cover, or smoke out other paintball players.
- Flash Bangs
  - Flash Bangs are more often seen on airsoft days. The flash bang has the same lighting technique as the hand grenade and smoke bomb, but after the fuse has been lit, it sparks a bright white flash to temporarily blind the opposition, or any other players that were staring at the pyrotechnic when it went off.

== Pictures ==
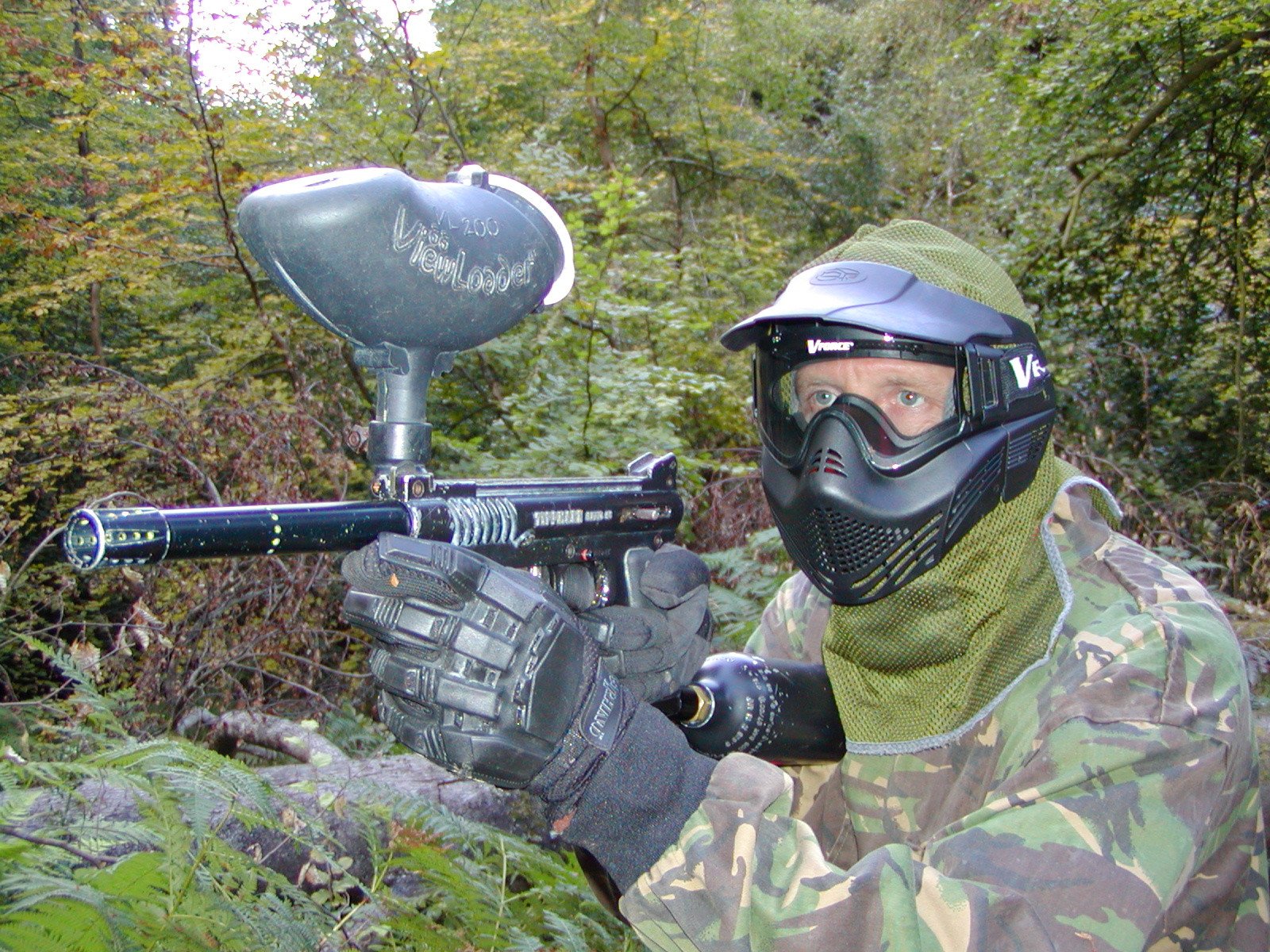
Skirmish Paintball Player

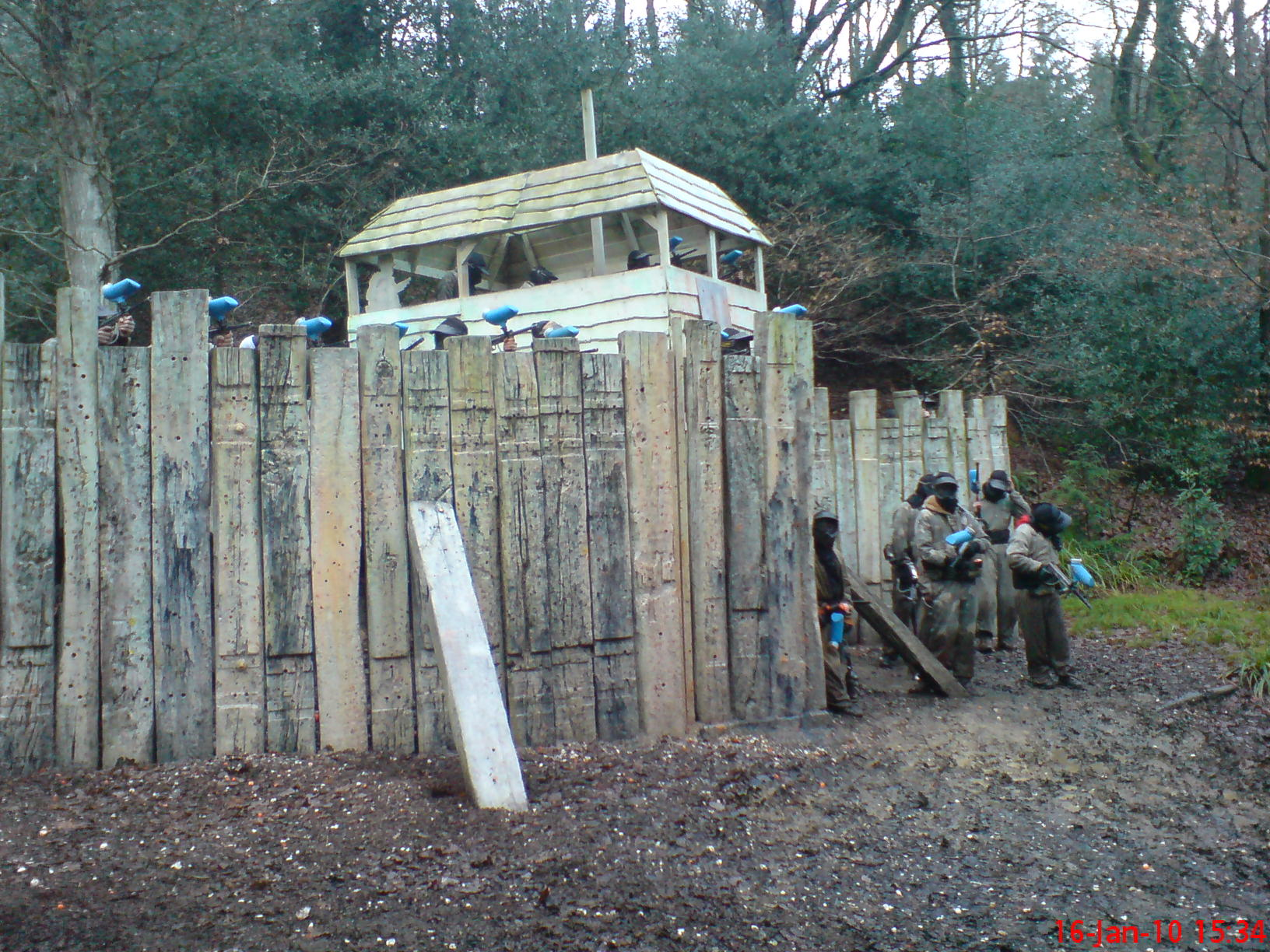
Fort at Skirmish Exeter

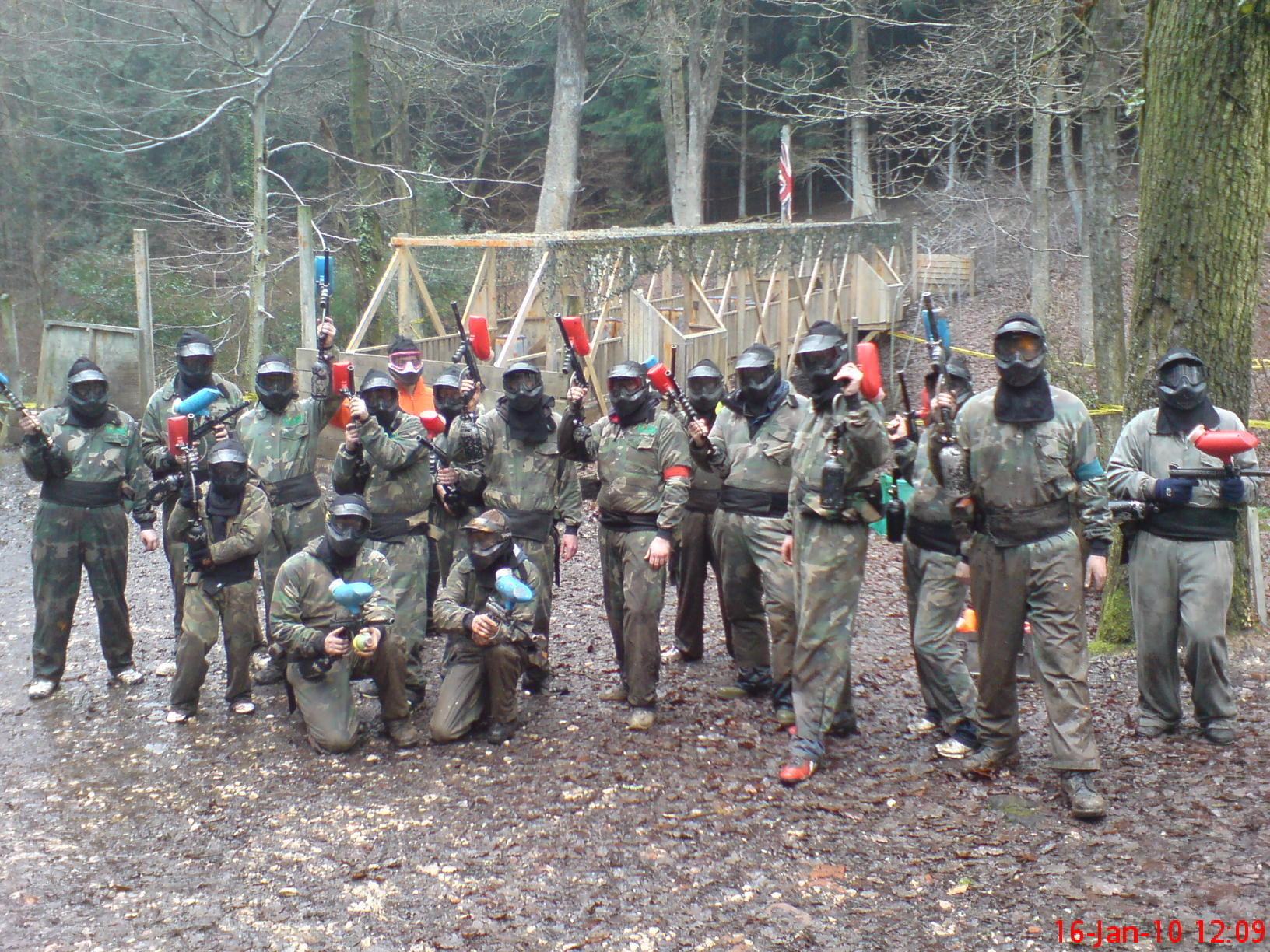
Group days out at Skirmish Paintball Exeter
