= Woodsball =

Type of paintball gaming

- Woodsball marksman in combat
- First played: June 27, 1981, Henniker, New Hampshire

Characteristics
- Contact: No physical contact between players (contact can result in penalties)
- Team members: Varies depending on game format and level of play (recreational or professional)
- Type: Extreme outdoor
- Equipment: Paintballs, paintball marker, CO_{2}/HPA (High Pressure Air), goggles, hopper

Woodsball (also known as woods paintball, hillball or bushball) is a format of paintball gaming, in which players compete in a natural outdoors area or a recreation of a town called urban fields (contrasting with inflatable bunker-based speedball format) using paintball guns to mark opponents. The term woodsball is sometimes used to describe non-milsim airsoft games, which take place in a forest.

It is recognized as the first format of paintball ever played, and is often used in conjunction with scenario paintball, allowing players to enact parts in a story or historical battle. This is due to its effectiveness in allowing players to simulate military situations using realistic weaponry and equipment; all of which are customizable - allowing each player to fulfill a tactical role. The types of games playable are nearly infinite, and include mostly capture the flag or elimination.

== Etymology ==
The first game of paintball was played in Henniker, New Hampshire on 27 June 1981, with players using a "Nel-spot 007" pistol; normally used by farmers and ranchers for marking trees and livestock. The term woodsball was a simple concatenation of the woods where games were originally played, and the ball from paintball.

== Game play ==
Woodsball is a style of paintball that can be played in natural terrain, including wooded areas - limited only by the availability of land. The basic rule of paintball still applies; players must attempt to eliminate opposing players using a paintball marker filled with paintballs. The format is flexible and is played at both the recreational level by enthusiasts of any skill level, and at the tournament level. The length of games is roughly determined by the expanse of the playing area and the number of players involved – generally it takes five to ten minutes before players make contact with an opposing player. Woodsball features large teams, in competition to obtain various goals and objectives. Large Scale woodsball games are commonly referred to as "Big Games" or "Scenario Games". Popular examples of this format are Cousin's Big Game in Coram, New York (on Long Island) and Hell Survivor's Monster Game just outside Pinckney, Michigan and Invasion of Normandy at Skirmish U.S.A in Pennsylvania which draws in about 3,500 to 4,500 players a year and lasts for two days. Another variant of the Big Game is the "Attack and Defend" format where large numbers of attackers try to overrun a fixed, but well-defended objective such as a compound or large building.

=== Strategic play ===
Woodsball players adhere to a unique strategy amongst the paintball variations, in that players can be given the option to equip themselves with differing equipment based on their assigned role or class within the team. The make-up of a player's role is potentially limitless, and can be based upon realistic military roles. Additionally, these classes may grant them unique options in the game - for example, one type of player may be able to communicate with gaming officials, while another may be allowed to begin the game before the rest of the players.

The natural terrain and weather conditions affect the strategic options offered to players in a differing way to a symmetrical playing field encountered in other regulated sports. Fields may contain both natural and artificial structures, including bunkers, barricades and bases. This may lead the players to adopt different types of strategies to meet their objective in woodsball. Weather conditions particular can affect players; wind can affect paintball trajectories, fog can hamper visibility, and hot and cold temperatures can affect CO_{2} in the paintball marker propellant system.

== Equipment ==
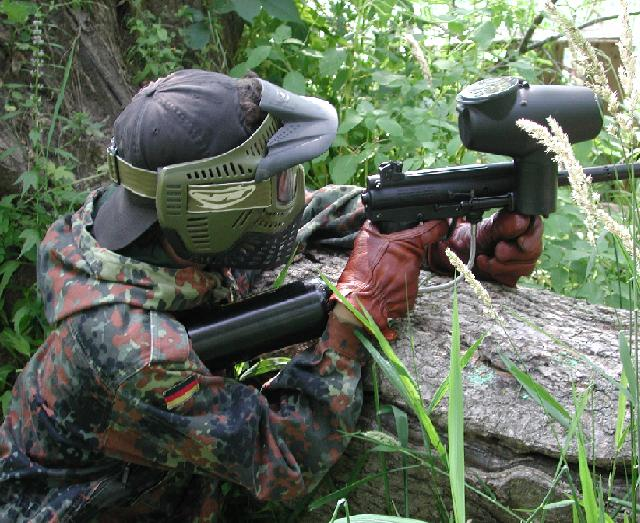
Woodsball player in German Flecktarn camouflage.

Woodsball equipment includes the standard mandatory paintball equipment, which includes marker, paintballs, harness/pod belt, and protective mask – but players also make use of other military items such as camouflage, combat boots, and ghillie suits. Additionally, a player's equipment might vary depending upon their style of play, or position.

While standard paintball equipment can be used in woodsball, manufacturers may market their products as specific to the woodsball game format. In most cases, such equipment is designed to be more reliable in outdoor harsh conditions. Gloves, padding and other armor are also allowed to improve comfort and safety in rugged playing environments, such as canyons and rocky areas.

=== Markers ===
While any paintball marker may be used in woodsball, the format allows for marker customization – allowing a player to fill tactical roles while using the same marker throughout. For example, a player might fulfill the role of a sniper by adding a telescopic sight, stock, and more accurate barrel to their marker. The same equipment can be later replaced by fully automatic grips and/or circuit boards, which enable the player to play as a gunner. Because of the range of possibilities, woodsball markers often come out of the box with basic configurations, allowing for later modification. Markers can also include military-simulation (or "Mil-Sim") markers - which appear aesthetically similar to real firearms.

=== Camouflage ===
Camouflage is of importance for woodsball; players need to blend into the surrounding environment, making it harder for the opposing team to spot the player. The exact nature of the camouflage may vary, and can include military (such as Flecktarn and MARPAT and one of the newest types of camo, multicam) or hunting styles (includes Mossy Oak and realtree). Players can also take advantage of "sasquatch" or "ghillie" suits, allowing them to remain undetected at close ranges.

== Tournament play ==
Woodsball players can take part in amateur or professional play, with tournaments organized by leagues worldwide; the game generally considered cheaper than the speedball tournament standard format, though not as widespread. The United States has two dominant leagues, the Woodsball Tournament League (WTL), and the Ultimate Woodsball League (UWL).

== Game variants ==
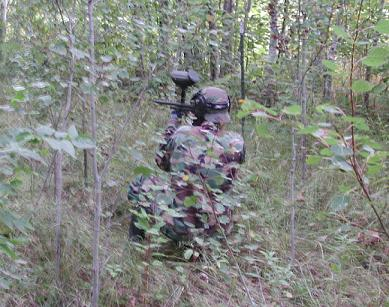
Woodsball scout in combat, with Camouflage

The particular rules and variants of woodsball are limitless; however, there are basic modes that are often played and organized by woodsball field operators.

- Capture the flag (CTF) – Both teams attempt to capture opposing teams flag, or a single neutral flag. Depending on the rules agreed upon, tagged players may be able to re-enter the game after an allotted time period.
- Elimination – Teams must tag every opponent without being eliminated themselves.
- Ironman – Teams or individuals play as per normal, but a tag does not count as an elimination. The game only ends once players either surrender or run out of paint.
- King of the hill – Players must either defend or capture a point of interest.
- Protect the VIP – Teams must protect a single player on their team, while opponents must eliminate this individual. Non-VIP players may re-enter the field after being tagged, but the game ends when a VIP is tagged.
- Zombies – One player starts against all others. But the one player is a zombie and can only be eliminated by getting marked on their head. If they shoot any opposing players they turn into a zombie after a certain respawn time. Game is over when either team is all eliminated.
- Common Foe – Respawn/resurrect players as new team to come in against remaining players from both teams.

== See also ==
- Paintball
- Scenario paintball
- Speedball
- Stock class paintball
