= Autococker =

Semiautomatic paintball marker

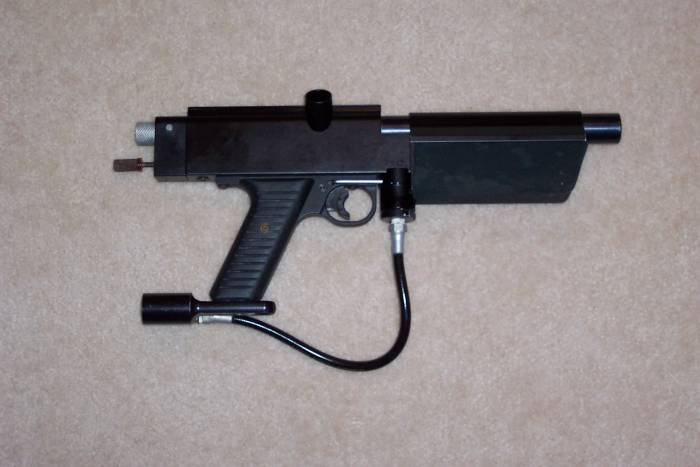
An early model Autococker

The Autococker is a closed-bolt semiautomatic paintball marker manufactured by Worr Game Products (WGP). It was one of the first paintball markers to be designed specifically for the sport, and has long been known throughout the paintball community for its popularity and customizability as well as its complexity. It is commonly believed that the closed-bolt design of the marker makes it inherently more accurate than its open-bolt counterparts, though this is disputed (see Accuracy, below).

Once a common sight at professional paintball tournaments (especially in the early- to mid-1990s), its popularity has since waned with the rise in popularity of electropneumatic markers.

== History ==
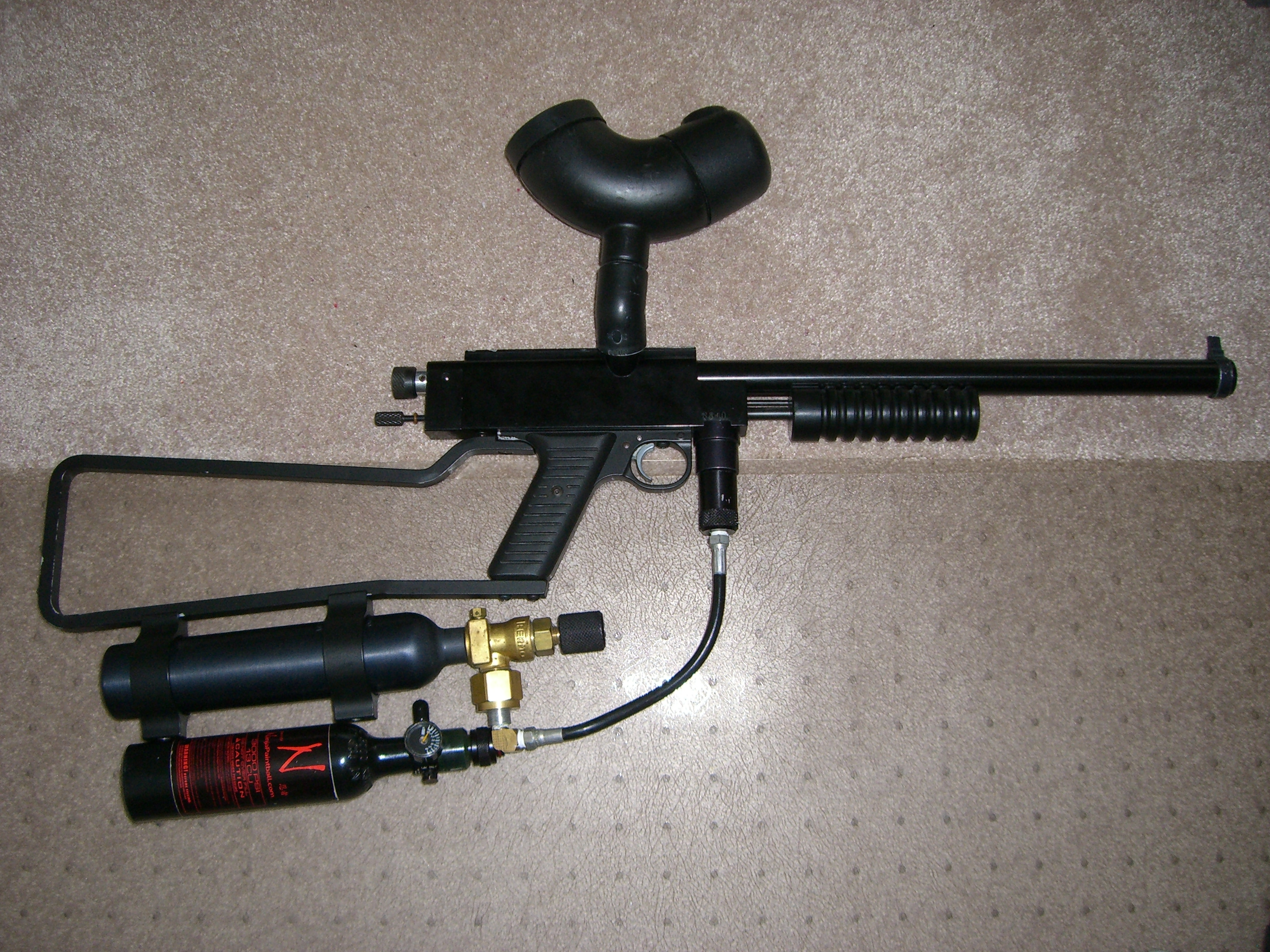
A 1991 WGP Sniper II Serial Number #3810. The precursor to the Autococker.

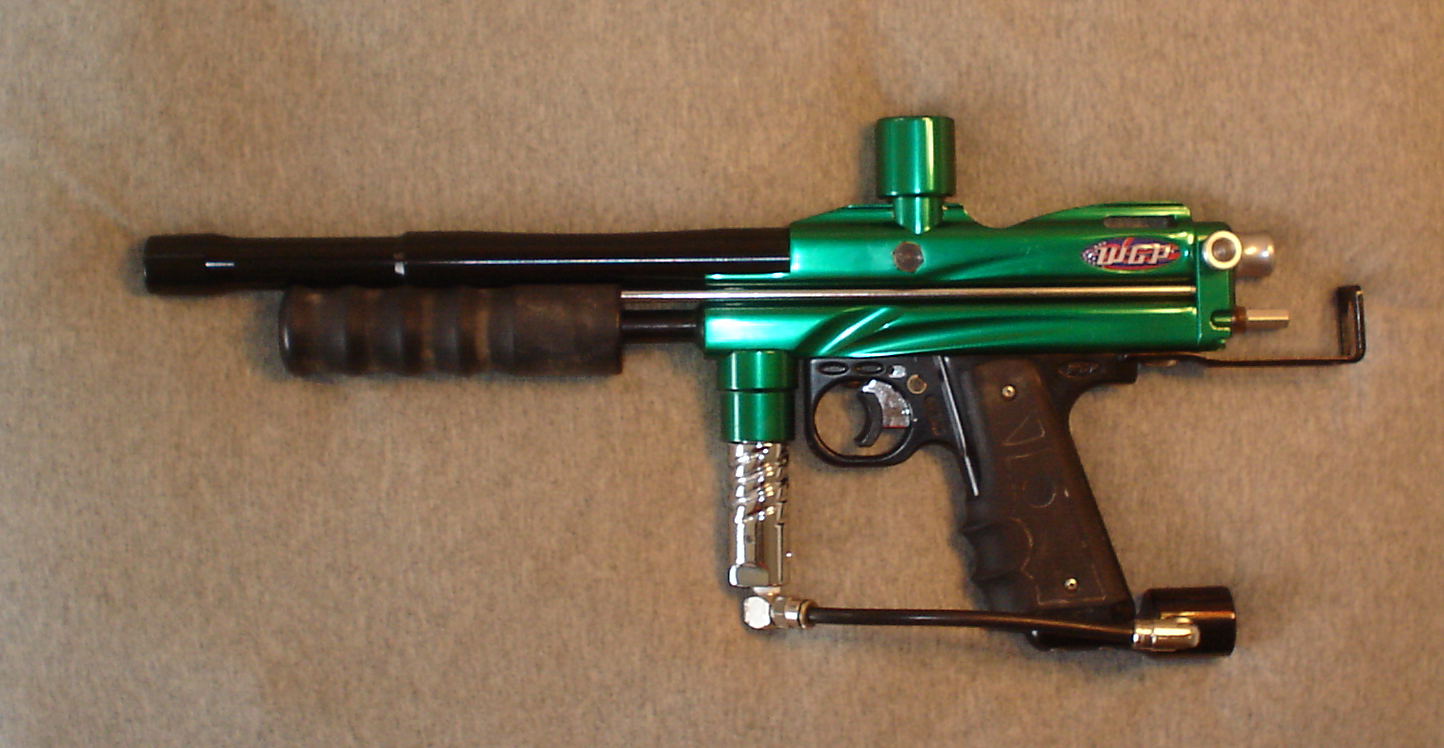
A 2003 WGP Vertical Feed Autococker with slider frame and a pump kit.

In late 1986, Bud Orr created the original Sniper pump marker by carving the works of a standard Sheridan PGP into an aluminum block that would accept a longer barrel. The Sniper was operated in a manner similar to pump-action shotguns in that it had to be manually recocked after each shot to load the next round. In 1987, Orr founded Worr Game Products to sell the products he was developing, and by 1988 he was running the business full-time. In order to stay competitive with the rising popularity of semiautomatic markers in the late 1980s, Orr added a pneumatic system onto the Sniper. The pneumatics automatically re-cocked the marker after each shot, and in 1989 the Autococker was born. There is a lot of controversy as to whether the design was stolen from Glenn Palmer (who has repeatedly and publicly made and defended this claim and has given a detailed accounting of the circumstances) or was actually Bud's innovation.

In the early 1990s the Autococker quickly rose to become one of the most popular markers used by top professional teams, used by such teams as Bob Long's original Ironmen. Although heavily criticized for reliability and a number of design defects, it proved to be an easy platform to work off and aftermarket parts soon appeared shortly after its inception. One of the most fundamental and important upgrades was the adjustable Palmer "Rock" low pressure regulator (LPR) to replace the troublesome "Sledge Hammer" stock LPR. With a variety of options appearing for parts, Belsales in the UK became the first company to build WGP-certified aftermarket cockers, called "Evolution" in 1993. Throughout the remainder of the 1990s, dozens of shops ranging from large notables such as Dave Youngblood Enterprises (Dye), Shocktech, Planet Eclipse, Belsales and FreeFlow down to small one man pro-shop operations made a business of servicing and customizing Autocockers with price tags of nearly $2000 for high-end models. A combination of performance, upgradeability and cosmetic options made it one of the top tournament markers of the 90's. Only the Automag rivaled it in popularity until electronic markers appeared. Indeed, the autococker was so ubiquitous that its barrel threading became one of the most commonly used standards on high-end markers (akin to how firearm cartridge sizes are often named for the first popular gun model or manufacturer to use them). To this day, most high-end markers, and many entry-level as well, accept barrels with "autococker threads".

By the turn of the century, with the advent and increased popularity of electropneumatics, it no longer became profitable for specialized shops to produce custom autocockers, and they slowly began to disappear. Though the introduction of partial-electropneumatic conversion kits in the early 2000s by companies like Planet Eclipse extended the autocockers' popularity by a few more years, the availability of fully electropneumatic markers that required less work to maintain caused the autococker to lose favor with tournament teams, and eventually, casual players as well. Newer Autocockers with integrated, solenoid-controlled pneumatics remain available, boasting lesser maintenance and tuning. "Classic" Autococker models retain some popularity with recreational players, some of whom "revert" the design back to the pump-action "Sniper" concept for use in pump play.

== Operation ==
The Autococker is essentially a pump marker with an automated pumping mechanism. It is a closed-bolt design, like all pump markers, and its operation can be broken down into two discrete phases, or cycles:

1) The firing cycle – The process that releases the gas that fires a paintball out of the marker is fairly simple compared to the re-cocking cycle. At rest, the bolt sits forward, closing the chamber (hence, closed-bolt). This prevents more paintballs from entering. A pull of the trigger drops the sear, which in turn releases the hammer. A spring propels the hammer forward into the valve, which causes the valve to release a burst of gas upward into the bolt. The bolt redirects the gas behind the paintball, propelling it out the barrel.

2) The re-cocking cycle – Once the paintball is fired, three things must happen in order to return the marker to a "ready" state: 1) the hammer must be pulled back so that it re-engages the sear and re-compresses the spring, 2) the bolt must be pulled back so that another paintball can fall from the feed tube into the breech, and 3) the bolt must be pushed forward after the paintball is loaded to close the breech.

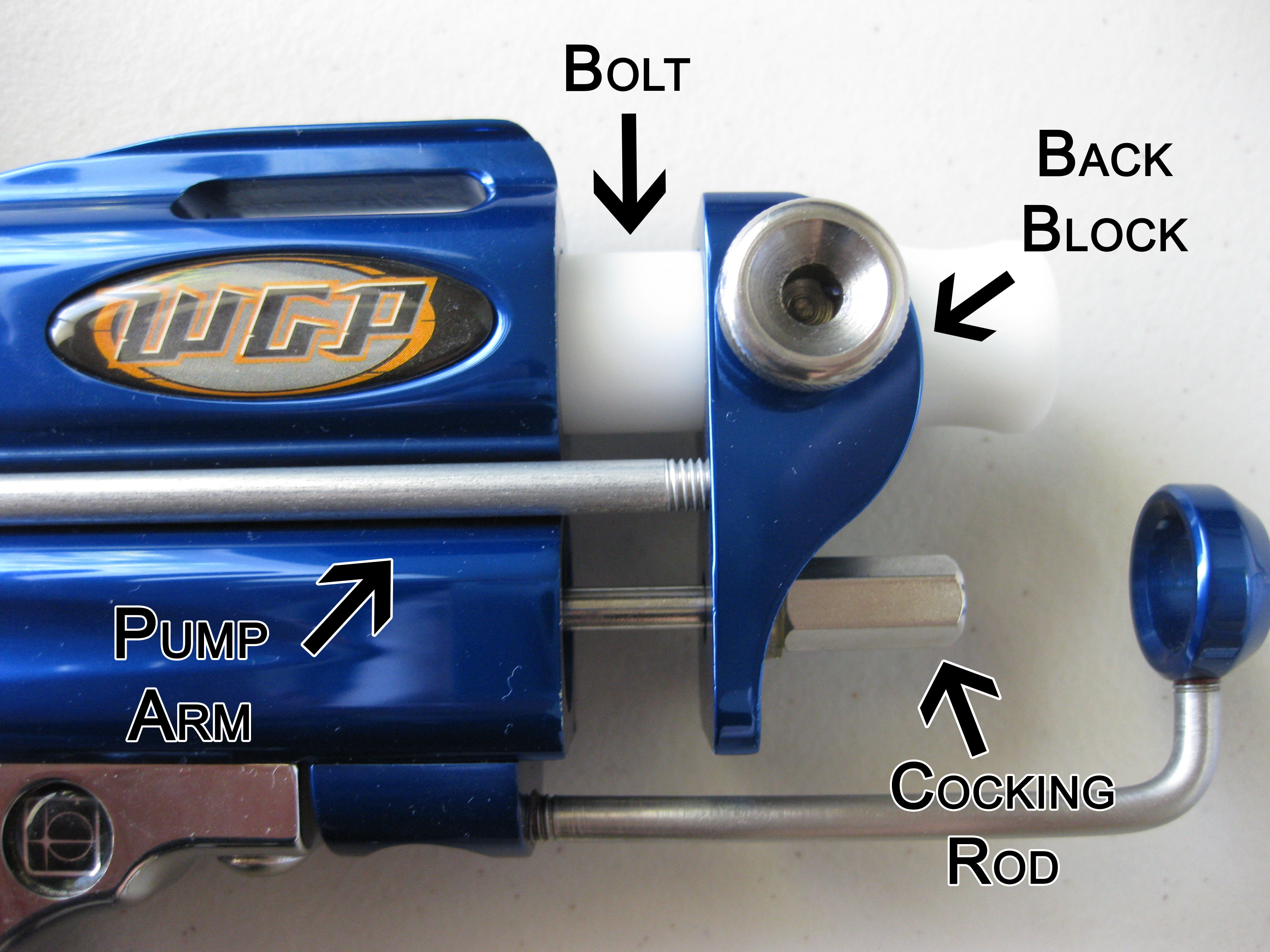
The Autococker back block

On both the Sniper and the Autococker, a back block performs all three of these functions. The bolt is attached to the block, while a cocking rod (which is attached to the hammer and designed to catch on the block) passes through it. When the block moves backward, it pulls the bolt back, allowing a paintball to drop into the breech. The backward movement simultaneously pulls the cocking rod back, causing the hammer to also be pulled back until it re-engages the sear. When the block moves forward, it pushes the bolt (and the paintball) forward, closing the breech. The cocking rod stays pulled back, with the hammer ready to fire.

On both the Sniper and Autococker, a pump rod runs from the front of the marker to the back block and serves as the means by which the back block moves forward and back. On the Sniper (and converted Autocockers), a pump handle is located on the front of the marker and attaches to the pump rod. After the player has pulled the trigger to fire a paintball, he/she then pulls back on the pump arm, pushing the back block rearward. This opens the bolt, allowing the next ball to be fed into the breech, and simultaneously pulls the hammer back until it is caught by the sear.

=== The front block ===
In the Autococker, a pneumatic system replaces the pump handle to automatically re-cock the marker (hence the name, "auto cocker"). The pneumatics are composed of three components: the low pressure regulator (LPR), the 3-way valve, and the ram. All three are grouped together at the front of the marker on what is known as the front block.

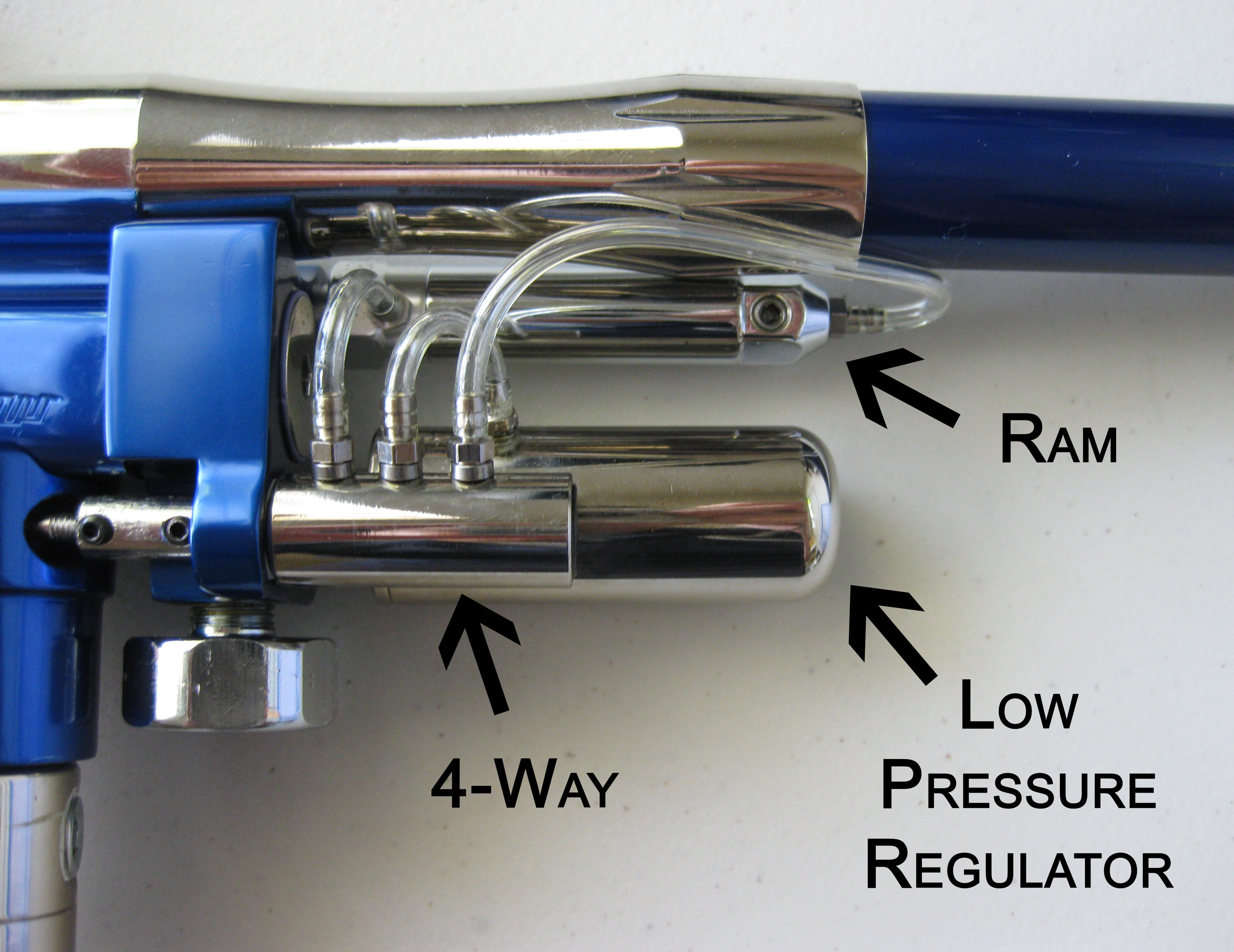
The Autococker front block

- The LPR is tapped into a channel inside the marker body through which air is routed to the bolt. Some of the gas used to fire the paintball is thus re-routed to the LPR. The LPR lowers the pressure to level appropriate for the pneumatic system (the pneumatics typically operate at < 100 PSI, versus a typical operating pressure of 400 PSI for the rest of the marker), before passing it on to the 4-way.
- The second component is the 4-way valve, known simply as a 4-way. The valve is commonly known as a 3-way valve because it has 3 visible ports, but this is technically incorrect. It is linked to the trigger via a short timing rod and activated when the trigger is pulled. The 4-way features three barbs on top, two of which are connected via small hoses to either end of the ram, and one of which is connected to the LPR. Gas from the LPR enters the 4-way through the center barb. Inside the 4-way is a small sliding rod (or "spool") with 2 or 3 o-rings forming flow chambers that link the center barb to one or the other of the outer barbs depending on its position. No more than two barbs are linked at any given time.
- The third component is the ram. The ram is connected to the pump rod and serves as the active pumping mechanism. It features two barbs, one near the front and one at the back, through which gas enters from the 4-way. O-rings inside the ram create compartments inside so that depending on whether gas enters the front or the back, the ram will either extend or retract. The end through which gas enters the ram depends on which barb in the 4-way is linked with the center barb.

== Timing ==
The re-cocking cycle as described above is understandably complex, involving many independent components that must be synchronized in order for the marker to function properly. The process of synchronizing these components is known as timing. Timing is a process unique to Autocockers, and viewed by non-owners as particularly onerous. Experienced Autococker owners claim however that with enough practice, timing becomes as simple and routine as the upkeep required of any other paintball marker.

Most Autocockers are timed at the factory, and only need to be retimed if some of the timing components (such as the hammer, 3-way, timing rod, etc.) are replaced.

Players experienced in both working on and operating Autocockers prefer a more careful timing process called suction, or vacuum timing. The recocking cycle is carefully moved closer towards the firing point, until the interaction between the ball exiting the barrel and the bolt recocking creates a vacuum in the breech. This causes the marker to effectively "suck" a paintball into the chamber.

== Accuracy ==
A common belief is that the closed-bolt design of Autocockers makes them inherently more accurate than open-bolt markers. This argument is premised on the fact that the bolt's mass does not move forward when the trigger is pulled, (as it does in open-bolt designs) since the ball is already "chambered" in the breech when the firing cycle is initiated. Proponents suggest that the absence of an oscillating mass during the firing cycle makes the autococker a more stable firing platform, which increases accuracy.

Tests have indicated however, that where there is a good paint-to-barrel match, the design of the marker is irrelevant. Open-bolt markers with a good paint-to-barrel match have proven to be just as accurate as the Autococker. These tests, however, did not measure the stability of the shooting platform, which is the main reason many believe Autocockers to be accurate. They instead used a fixed mounting point which artificially equalizes the stability of both marker tested. Additionally, these test were performed with a single marker modified to act like both and open or closed bolt paintball marker. This modification along with the poor quality of the modified marker leads to inherently inaccurate shots for both versions.

The belief that Autocockers are more accurate due to their design is partially due to the confounding fact that the Autococker requires a good paint-to-barrel match. In open-bolt markers, the breech is open during the firing phase, since the bolt is in a "back" position. Thus, a rubber detent keeps the "chambered" ball from rolling out of the barrel before the marker is fired. The closed-bolt design of the marker means that paintballs are held in the chamber, beyond the breech where the detent is located. The only thing keeping the paintball from rolling out the barrel is a good paint-to-barrel match. Autococker owners unaware of this fact tend to notice that paintballs roll out of the barrel when the end is pointed downward.

== Criticisms ==
Reliability: Due to their large number of moving parts, Autocockers are popular with tinkerers. Since even seemingly unimportant aspects of the marker, such as how far the back block is screwed onto the pushrod, can affect Autococker performance, minor tinkering with the marker can compound over time and lead to failure. It is not uncommon for an inexperienced owner to try to fix an Autococker that is not broken, frequently with disastrous results. As a result, rumors of Autocockers being unreliable have circulated the internet for years. The reality however, is that Autocockers are extremely reliable once set up properly. Experienced owners that understand how each of the parts in the marker interact are consistently able to modify and upgrade the marker without causing problems. Since new Autocockers are designed to work "out of the box," new owners are usually advised to not tinker with anything until they fully understand how the marker works.

Gas Efficiency: Although the Autococker operates at lower pressures than many of its contemporaries, such as the Kingman Spyder and Automag, the forces and pressures at play in the firing and recocking mechanisms must be balanced for the greatest effectiveness at the desired shot velocity, something that does not have to be done (at least to this degree) in any other marker. This is generally known as "sweet-spotting" the marker, or more specifically the marker's high-pressure regulator or HPR. If the HPR is set at too low a pressure, the marker will get insufficient pressure to fire the ball at the desired velocity or even to operate. If set too high, the pressure against the back of the valve will work against the hammer opening the valve to fire the paintball and again reduce velocity. Either way, the consistency of shots and the gas efficiency of the marker are reduced, and a common complaint among inexperienced Autococker users is that they do not get many shots from a full tank of air or CO_{2}. Balancing the marker requires firing several shots over a chronograph to find the "sweet spot" of the HPR (the point at which the velocity is highest, then adjusting the hammer spring tension to increase or decrease velocity, and re-adjusting the HPR to find the new sweet spot, until the marker is firing at field limits with the HPR at or near its sweet spot. The LPR controlling the pneumatics must then be adjusted to use the least amount of pressure necessary to move the back block fully rearward. This process requires access to a shooting range with a chronograph, and significant time, air, paint and patience, which many casual players do not possess.

Slow rate of fire: In an era where electropneumatic markers are prized for their high rate of fire in both tournament and recreational play, the slower mechanical operation of the Autococker (at least in entry-level models) is looked upon with some disdain. The first production E-cocker conversion was the PMS mark 3 system in the late 90s, which met with minimal success but paved the way for offerings by Sandridge (fully electronic and one of the first electro's to use eye technology) and the centerflag Uprising (partial conversion). Next generation frames from Racegun and Eclipse (with multiple fire modes, fully electronic sear and pneumatics) were the first frames to find broad use and the Eclipse E-Blade became the standard for electro-cockers but was discontinued in 2006. WGP's own electropneumatic system, based on technology licensed from Planet Eclipse, is now standard on many of their new Autococker models.

Short-Stroking: On mechanical Autocockers, the trigger both fires the marker (by releasing the sear) and re-cocks it (by pulling the timing rod and activating the 3-way). The pull of the trigger accomplishes first one, then the other, in a precisely timed operation, making it necessary for the player to fully pull and release the trigger each time. Only partially pulling the trigger, known colloquially as "short-stroking", will alter the duration of time the pneumatics are actively operating the recocking mechanism, or may eliminate the re-cocking cycle altogether. Short-stroking can thus cause many malfunctions related to one or more steps of the recocking process not being performed. For instance, if the back block does not move fully rearward, the hammer may not be caught by the sear, and will be released into the pin valve immediately upon the back block moving forward again. If the back block is not kept rearward long enough for a paintball to drop fully into the chamber, a "dry fire" or a "ball chop" may occur, the latter being extremely frustrating as it drastically affects accuracy of future shots until the barrel, breech and bolt are cleaned. The need for a full trigger pull on mechanical Autocockers also results in a slower rate of fire.

Sear Trip: Even with an electronic trigger, the Autococker still relies on a hammer and spring valve for firing. The electronic trigger controls the recocking pneumatics, and a sear solenoid. Thus, even electronic Autocockers have an amount of recoil and rate of fire some find unacceptable for serious play (though Autocockers are still seen in serious tournament play). In early 2006, the first fully electronic (valve and recock) electronic Autocockers were seen, made using the "mQ valve" (named after their inventor Mike Quinn). The valve only had a limited release cycle however, and became tied up in production and legal issues. A lack of steady supply of mQ valves caused prices to skyrocket on eBay, even for used or damaged ones. In mid-2007, the original creators announced that they had resolved the production issues and are now making new "mQ2 valves," which are mQ valves redesigned for greater reliability, flow, and consistency.

== Variants ==
WGP has produced several of its own "higher-end" versions of its base Autococker:

- STO ("Special Tournament Operations")
- Vertebrae
- Orracle
- Black Magic (two versions)
- Worrlock
- Superstock
- Karnivor
- Jeff Orr Signature Series
- Prostock
- Outkast
- Nightkast (outkast marker with factory e-blade)
- Trilogy series

=== Trilogy autococker ===
After its acquisition by K2 in 2004, WGP decided to produce Autocockers that could compete with entry-level markers like Kingman's Spyder and Smart Parts' Ion. However, the popular perception of Autocockers as "complex" and "difficult to maintain" was a serious hurdle to WGP's ability to market it to beginner players. The decision was made to "simplify" the functions of the Autococker, and the result was the Trilogy line.

On Trilogy Autocockers, the front block is removed, and the pneumatics are attached directly on to the body. The 3-way valve is also integrated into the body and cannot be replaced with third-party upgrades. This lack of the front block allows them to be produced at lower cost while decreasing complexity. However, upgrades to the marker can be a bit more difficult because of this. For example, an adapter is needed to allow the use of standard LPR's, and specialized pump kits are required to make a Trilogy a pump gun.

Within the Trilogy Autococker line, there are three models, the Pro, Competition, and Sport. Variations such as the Trilogy Tactical have the same basic mechanical components; changes are mostly cosmetic. The Trilogy Pro and Tactical models are available with an electronic frame called Trilogy Select Fire. This is different from the separately available WorrFrame Select Fire, such as can be found on the 2005 Black Magic model. The Trilogy Select Fire, uses the 3-way valve integrated into the body of the gun rather than an electronic solenoid like other electronic frames.

Though most markers in the Trilogy line are mechanical, it is possible to add an electronic trigger frame, which bypasses elements like the integrated 3-way. Later released Eclipse Blade 2 kits had an adapter for this purpose. The Trilogy can also be converted to manual pump-action, similar to the original Sniper line, which makes the integrated 3-way irrelevant.
