= Speedball (paintball) =

Variant of paintball

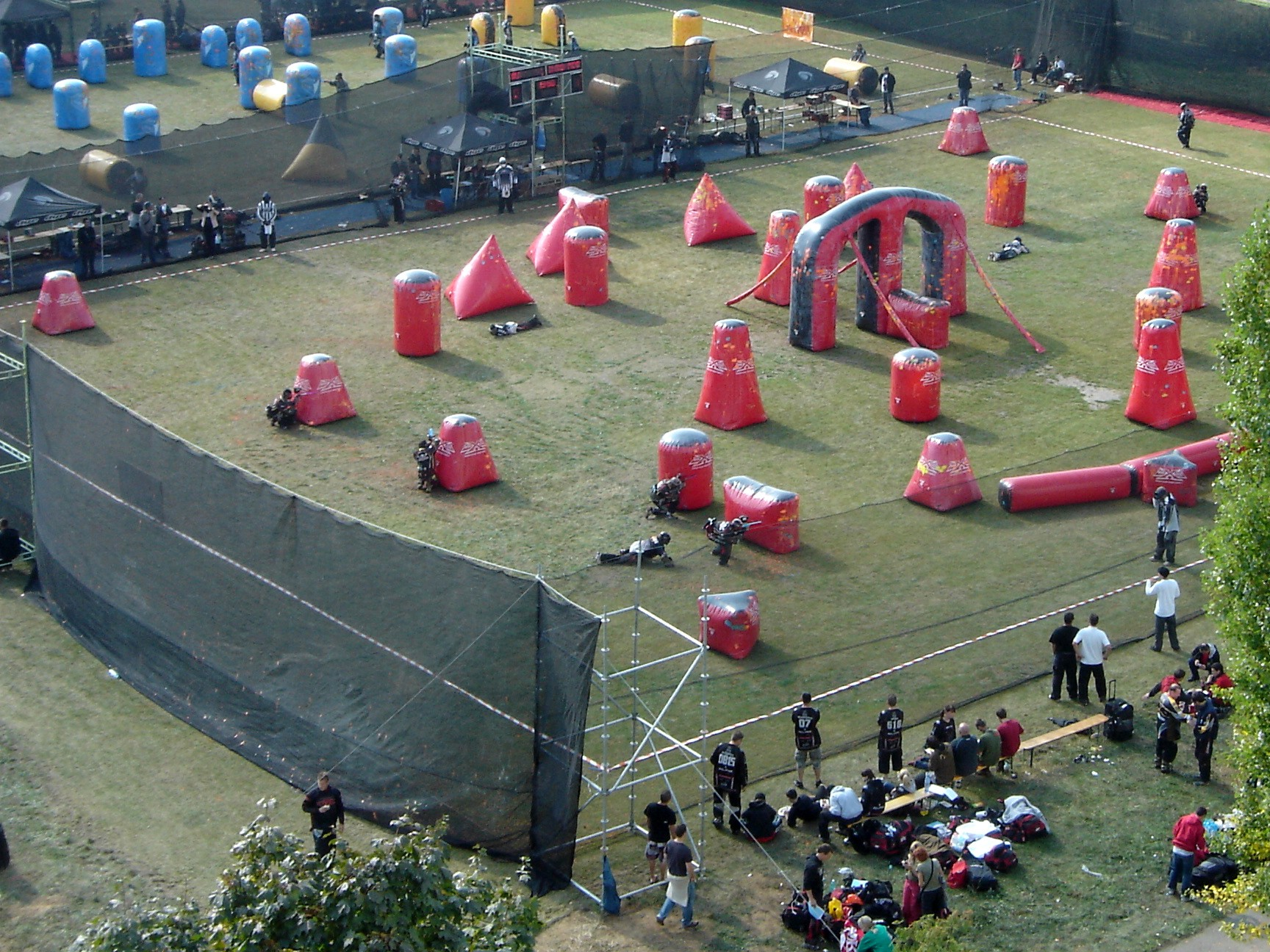
A speedball game in progress

Speedball is one of the three distinct game variants in the sport of paintball, along with woodsball and scenario paintball.

It is a general term for a game in which the playing field is composed of inflatable bunkers, of the same location and number on each side of the field, that provide an equal playing field for each team competing. It was created in this way to give a better format for competitive paintball, both in playing and viewing the games.

== General ==
Paintball is one of the most widely played extreme sports in the United States. Due to the popularity of the speedball variant in professional paintball leagues, speedball evolved paintball into a more formalized game, with each league having a differing format. Paintball was originally a recreational activity, but became a sport with the advent of organized speedball tournaments, professional teams making use of coaching, corporate endorsements, media coverage, and fan followings.

== History ==
During the 1980s and 90s, tournament paintball was played strictly in the woods. Because of different terrains the playing field was different at every park. However, a popular playing field in Southern California called SC Village featured a field bereft of trees or natural cover and just contained roofless plywood buildings in the late 1980s. However, there was a large water-filled lagoon right in the middle of the field. It was aimed at making the game more spectator-friendly. This was the favorite of many players because of its fast-paced action. This is what started a new format of paintball that became known as speedball, due to its faster pace of play. The field was tweaked and worked with to adjust to players' liking until 1996 when the first fully inflatable field was unveiled by Brass Eagle. Because of the ability to transport and reconfigure inflatable bunkers, and the lower potential for injury due to players colliding with them, this type of field would eventually become the standard field type for most tournament paintball leagues in North America.

== Game play ==
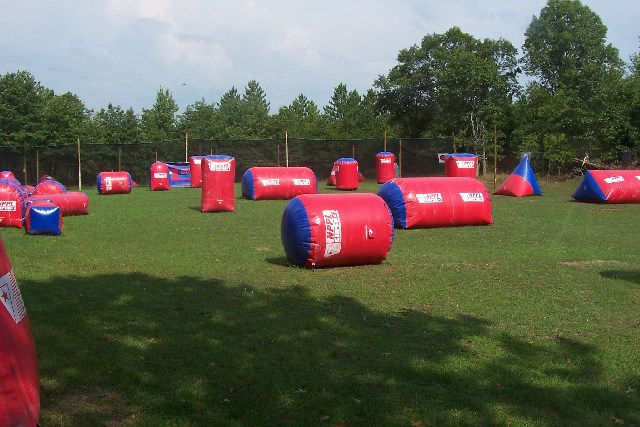
A typical speedball field, often used for tournaments.

Speedball is a team sport, and can be played recreationally or professionally, with games usually specifying teams of three, five, seven, or ten. The game is characterized by a small horizontally symmetrical playing field, with obstacles (such as inflatable bunkers) placed in various configurations to challenge players, and various game times. Stealth and concealment is of little use on a speedball field; there is very little to blend in with. Success is dependent upon teamwork, aggressive movement, and constant communication. Players wear uniforms, similar to more traditional sports.

Speedball leagues specify the points system to be used for games. The current standard of the NXL is that for every time you touch the "buzzer" (a button at the opponents team start bunker) you will earn 1 point, given you were not shot before touching it, or if the opposing team concedes the point at any time during the round. In the past, various scoring methods have existed. For example, in the NPPL's opposing flag format, points were awarded for staying in the game the whole round, shooting someone out, grabbing the flag, and hanging the flag. PSP used to use the Race2 format, where a match between two teams involves multiple games of center flag; there is a flag in the center of the field, and a team is awarded a point every time the flag is captured and hung on the opposing team's start box.

Given the nature of the sport, referees exist to ensure the sport is played fairly and safely. At the referees discretion, players may be pulled from play due to a penalty being assessed against them. Penalties can occur for a range of reasons, not limited to; playing on with a hit, having a marker set to an illegal firing mode, touching the buzzer with a hit on them, wiping a hit, or overshooting a opposing player. Depending on the severity of the offence, penalties may be a "one-for-one", being the player who committed the infraction and another player on their team, a "two-for-one", the player and two of their teammates, and so on.

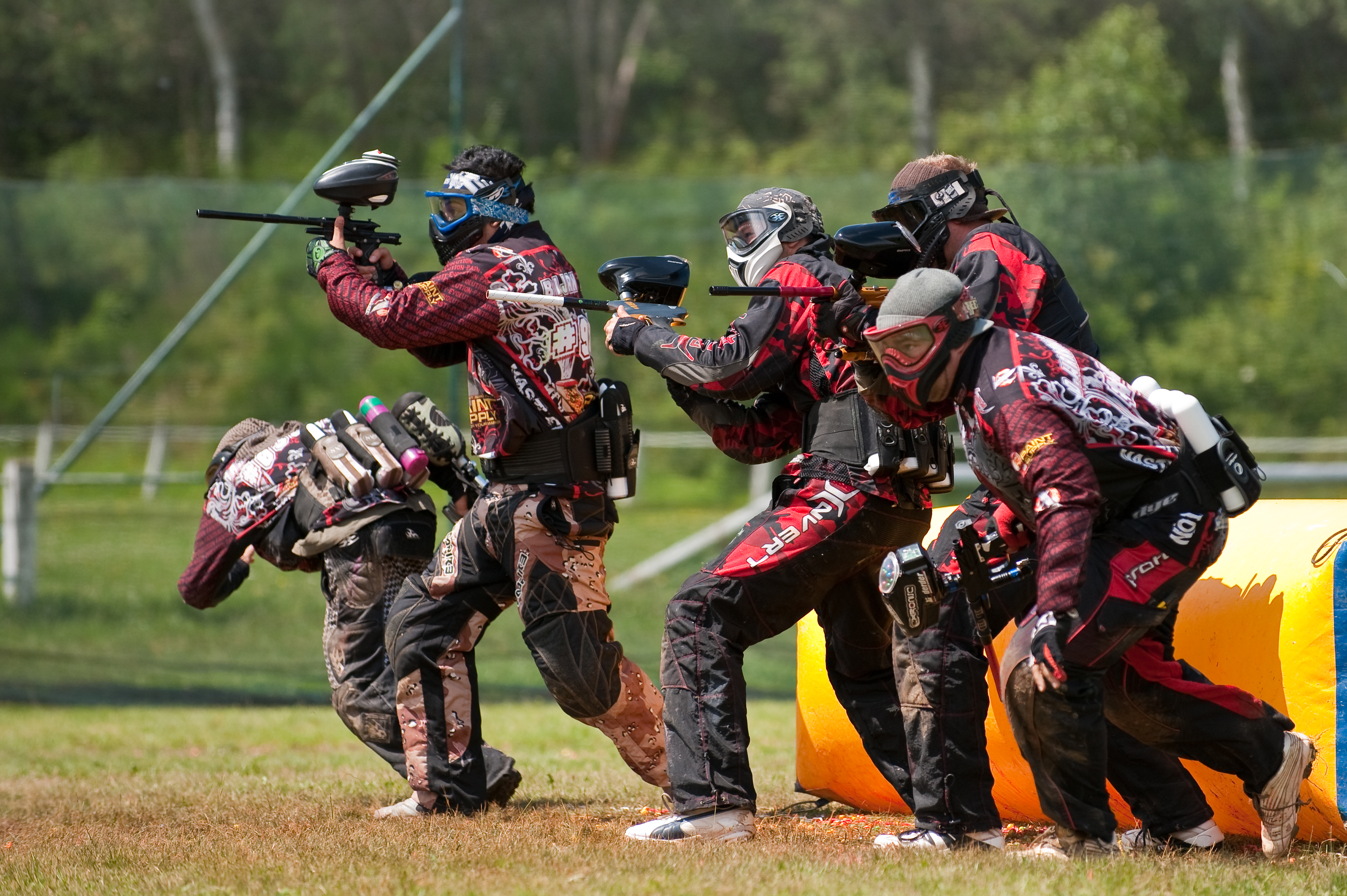
Players on the breakout next to a Sup'Air

Because of the small size, generally less than 20,000 square feet, and openness of the field, proper positioning combined with restricting movement is a primary element of speedball tactics; the team who is better able to keep their opponents pinned behind cover while they themselves are free to move will have an enormous advantage. Therefore, the number of shots fired by each player is significantly higher than in woodsball games.

== Leagues ==
The main league within speedball is the National Xball League (NXL). The league covers the US, Latin America and Europe, and hosts tournaments at all levels of play, from Division 5 all the way to Pro tournaments, with over 500 teams across these divisions.

Sponsorships, television endorsements, extensive media coverage, and nationwide events have all pushed the leagues into mainstream popularity. In 2007, at World Cup, the most popular PSP event located at Disney's Wide World of Sports Complex, boasted over 35,000 spectators and featured 373 teams. There are also numerous regional and local events all over the world, including most paintball fields which host their own events.

== Markers ==
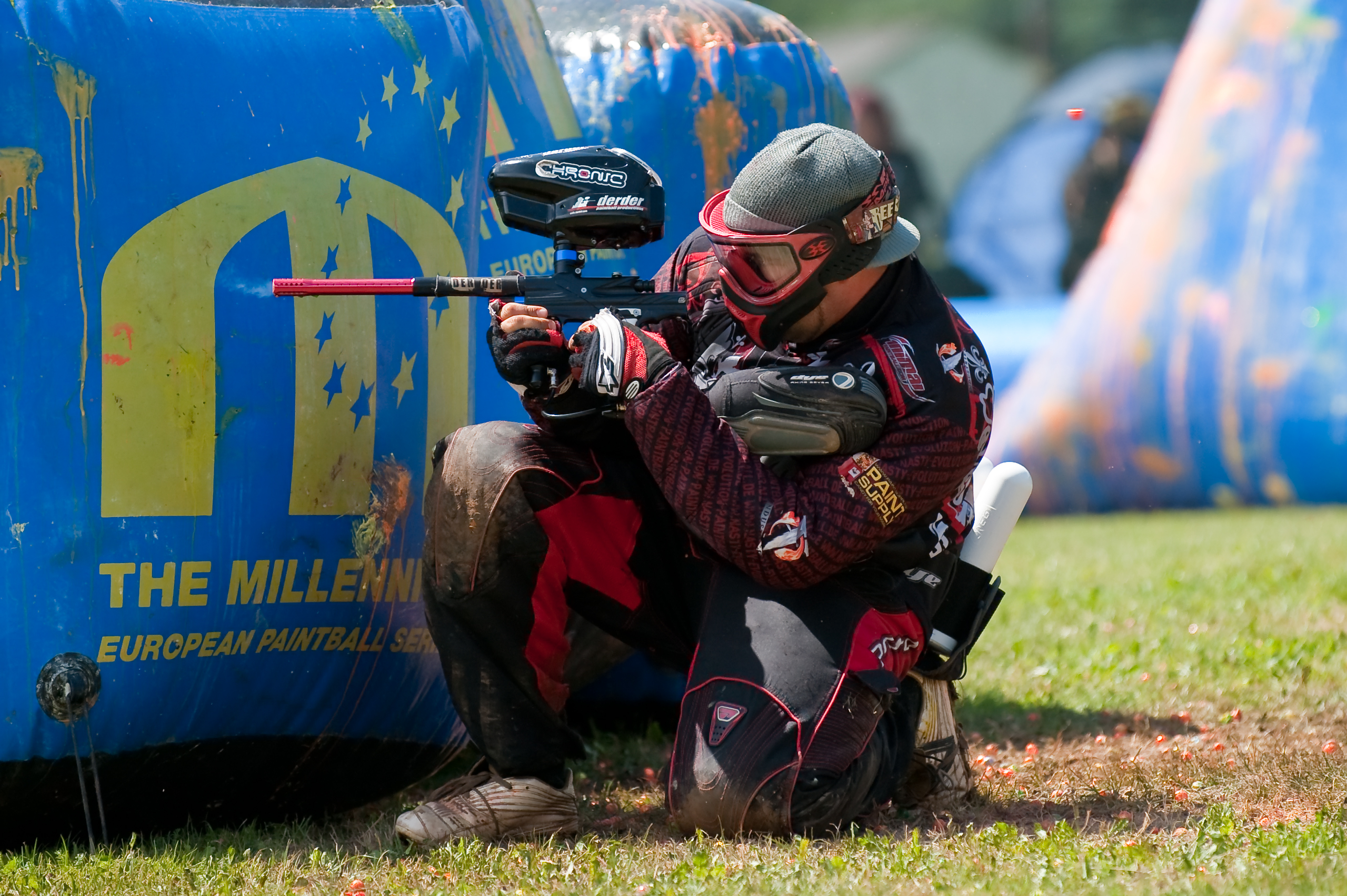
Sup'Air player under fire

Speedball paintball markers are designed to be small so they do not present a large target; in virtually all tournament rule sets, a player is eliminated if they, or anything they are wearing or holding including their marker, is hit. Tournaments also specify allowable firing modes and rates of fire. The current format for NXL is a 10.5bps maximum, with the marker entering a "ramp" setting after 3 consecutive semi-auto shots that occur within 200ms of each other. The marker will continue to shoot at 10.5bps given that every trigger pull after the fact happens within the 200ms window. The circuitry of modern electro-pneumatic markers generally incorporates specific firing modes that follow each league's basic rules. Beyond regulations to rate of fire, some paintball markers use anti-chop "eyes" to prevent the marker firing without a paintball securely seated in the chamber. This ensures that a paintball, which has only fed halfway, is not "chopped" in half as the bolt closes the chamber, which will affect accuracy of subsequent shots due to paintball fragments left in the chamber and barrel.

Modern speedball markers tend to be electro-pneumatic in design, and run off compressed air. Slightly older models of speedball guns used to run mechanically, but higher rates of fire could not be reached due to longer trigger pulls and heavier pull weights. Electronic markers replaced the often heavy and long pull of a mechanical trigger, needed to manipulate the mechanical linkage to the firing mechanism, with a simple electronic button or other sensor that detects a trigger pull. As a result, electro-pneumatic markers' trigger pulls are often measured in millimeters of travel and just a few grams of pull weight, allowing for very fast rates of fire using various techniques of "walking" the trigger (alternating pulling the trigger with index and middle fingers).

The technology of speedball markers has been advancing over time. Every year companies make guns more consistent, accurate, reliable and convenient. Although this technology can become costly, some players are willing to invest large amounts of money into their markers. The advancement of technology in markers also means that less-expensive technologies, usually based around the circuitry of a marker, can be integrated into lower-cost markers, making entry-level speedball markers very competitive in many ways to higher-cost models.
