= Destiny (Paintball) =

Professional paintball team

Destiny is an American Organization, 2nd division female professional paintball team. The team was founded by player Mona Cohen who was a former player of Valkyries. She brought two of her players from Valkyries with her, Evelyn Harris & Seanette Taylor, to the new team that participated in their first tournament together in Huntington Beach, CA.
