= Slide check =

A slide check is a valve used in pressurized systems that lets air out ahead of it (the destination) while keeping pressure intact from behind it (the source). Slide checks are commonly used in paintball, mostly in remote propulsion setups, to cut air off from the gun while keeping the remote pressurized. Slide checks are also useful when working with high pressure systems, such as hydro testing or audible air or CO_{2} leaks as you can rapidly apply pressure and release it without the frighting "pow" or projection of hoses with QD male {quick disconnect} fittings causing a dangerous hose whip motion.

== See also ==
- Paintball Equipment
