= Oklahoma D-Day =

Oklahoma D-Day was the world's largest scenario game of paintball that recreates events of World War II, held at Oklahoma's D-Day Adventure Park in Wyandotte, Oklahoma every June. The game was created by Dewayne Convirs, and was first held in 1997 - with attendance of 135 players. The following year was more popular, with 335 players participating.

== General ==
The game seeks to faithfully recreate battles from the real Normandy invasion, including Omaha Beach, Utah Beach, Sword Beach, Colleville, Sainte-Mère-Église, Caen, Pegasus Bridge, and Vierville. The game caters to an average of 4,000 players a year, often run on the anniversary of the events being recreated.

The site has 100 acres (0.40 km^{2}) of camping area and amenities for players, and the game is played on a 740-acre (3.0 km^{2}) area at the D-Day adventure park with a range of differing terrains to suit different scenarios (including open fields, ravines and creek beds). Trench works, villages, firebases, headquarters, bunkers and gun emplacements provide strategic options for players. Play itself deviates from standard tournament paintball rules - in that when hit by paint, players move to a reinsertion zone and are back in the game within thirty minutes. Emphasis is on completing objectives rather than solely eliminating enemy players, and the game makes extensive usage of World War II era equipment and vehicles (including tanks and bazookas, among the standard paintball markers).

In game, players belong to either the Germans or the Allies. Allied forces include the French resistance, Americans, British, and Canadians. Each side has its own Battle Staff in corresponding "tactical operations centers" and divisions assigned to three different beachhead or other objectives. The Allies invade from off playing field locations, including actual wet insertions from landing craft.

A documentary film about the event, Soldiers of Paint, was released in May 2013.
