= UKPSF =

The UKPSF (United Kingdom Paintball Sports Federation) is a United Kingdom voluntary body that exists to promote the sport of paintball, liaise with government bodies, local authorities and try to make the game of paintball safe and fun to play.

Working closely with government departments the UKPSF has clarified several laws relating to paintball in the UK, one policy that was clarified was the "Anti Social Behaviour Act 2003. The UKPSF has also created guidelines for subjects such as HPA system safety, correct paintball goggle/mask use, correct use of barrel "plugs" "socks" "bungs" or "condoms" and importantly "buying and selling paintball guns in the UK" all of which work inside all known government legislation. These practices should be enforced so that the safety aspect of paintballing in the UK is not compromised. In extreme cases, accidents or injuries that go to court to be settled could lead to full investigation of the paintball industry, this could damaging the paintball industry irreparably leading to higher insurance costs, and new government legislation restricting paintball in the UK.

The UKPSF work to raise awareness of the risks, and to protect the paintball industry.

== UKPSF Site Accreditation scheme ==
This Accreditation means that Parents, Schools and government services can be assured that venues have met the high standards of health and safety expected from a UKPSF Accredited venue.

== Individual membership ==
The UKPSF also run a personal membership for paintball players, membership covers the players insurance for playing paintball at any UKPSF accredited venue. They ensure the safety of paintball players at all levels, from an occasional player, or a fully sponsored Professional paintballer.

Full membership covers you under the UKPSF insurance at all "UKPSF accredited venues" or "UKPSF Affiliated Events", however public liability insurance already covers you in the event of any injury or mishap.

One of the UKPSF's goals is to get paintball as a recognised sport in the UK, to send the application to the UK Sports Council the UKPSF need a minimum of 1800 "active" members, as well as being able to check off a huge list of criteria set out by the UK sports council.

== Legal Status ==
The UKPSF is not a legally accredited organisation and despite claims of liaising with The Home Office to aid in legal matters, The Home Office does not recognise them as such and uses internal experts to clarify controversial elements such as frangible ammunition and replica firearms laws.

== Controversy ==
The UKPSF is often subject within the UK paintball community to heavy criticism, this is due to the fact that despite its claims as being the governing and legal body of UK paintball, it holds no such position. The largest criticism of the group is its offer of insurance among any UKPSF affiliated site; this is misleading in that it falsely leads to the belief that UKPSF membership is the only way to insure and protect both the customers and the site owners; in fact among UK law customers are covered by Public Liability Insurance and owners are covered by legal waivers. Larger criticism comes from the organisations make-up, made up of large names and groups in the industry including product makers and large site owners, meaning there is legal group for the group to be classed as a business cartel, something that is legally grey under UK law. The group has little popular support within UK paintball and has yet to meet its membership requirement of 1800.
