= Paintball equipment =

Equipment required to play Paintball

Paintball is an equipment-intensive sport and in order to safely conduct a game, every player requires a marker with propellant to fire the paint, a mask to protect the eyes and face, paintballs, and a loader to hold them. To ensure safety off the playing field, a barrel sock or plug for the marker is also compulsory.

Depending on type of play, additional equipment can include gloves, a pack designed to comfortably carry pods containing extra paintballs, and a squeegee or swab for cleaning out the barrel in case a paintball breaks. Players may also elect to wear padding or armor in order to reduce the impact of incoming paintballs.

== Markers ==
A paintball marker is the primary piece of equipment used in paintball to tag an opposing player. An expanding gas (usually carbon dioxide or high-pressure air) forces a paintball through the barrel at a muzzle velocity of approximately 90 m/s (300 ft/s). This velocity is sufficient for most paintballs to break upon impact at a distance, but not so fast as to cause tissue damage beyond mild bruising. Nearly every commercial field has, and strictly enforces, a rule limiting the muzzle velocity of a paintball at or below 90 m/s (300 ft/s). Speeds above 250 are typically needed to ensure the paintball breaks on impact; the field limit is thus usually somewhere in between, often 260-280fps. The technology used to design and build paintball markers has advanced over time, beginning with the original "Nel-Spot" bolt-action pistols, progressing to pump-action markers, then to semi-automatic mechanical markers, and finally culminating in the electropneumatic paintball marker.

== Propellants ==
Paintball markers are powered by the expansion of gas stored in a compressed gas bottle. The two most common forms of compressed gas are carbon dioxide and high-pressure air (HPA).

=== Carbon dioxide ===
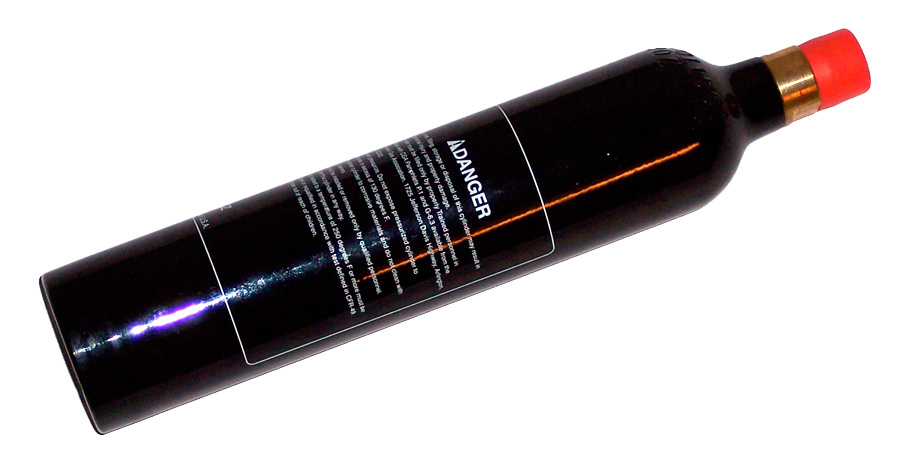
A typical CO_{2} canister

Because CO_{2} becomes a liquid when compressed, it must expand to a gas in order to be used by most paintball markers, although several older models actually require liquid CO_{2} in order for proper operation. This expansion is not adiabatic and requires energy, causing the tank to cool as heat is used to expand the liquid CO_{2} into gas. Eventually, under sustained fire, and especially in cold weather, the tank can become so cold that ice crystals form on it. If the CO_{2} bottle does not have an anti-siphon tube fitted, or is shaken while firing, the liquid CO_{2} may enter the marker. The liquid CO_{2} then passes through the marker instead of the tank, evaporating and causing the marker to freeze. This results in large clouds of CO_{2} vapor ejected from the marker upon firing, caused by the liquid CO_{2} evaporating in/around the barrel. This is known as "drawing liquid". This can cause damage to internal seals and O-Rings, and can "freeze" some markers, putting it out of commission for some time while it warms back up. Simple operation designs such as in-line blow-back (most Tippmanns), guns designed before HPA was more widely used, or guns using 12-gram CO_{2} powerlets are usually not affected by this problem, but it can still cause damage to the marker over time. For this particular reason, most high-end markers recommend that you use HPA. Technically, CO_{2} and HPA can propel the paintball, but when high rates of fire are attained, liquid is sucked into the marker which can damage or even destroy electrical components inside the marker such as the solenoid. Never leave a CO_{2} container in sunlight, as the heat will cause the gas to expand to a dangerous level. The tanks include safety valves in their construction, but there is no need to use them or take unnecessary risks.

With normal back-bottle setups (or, air systems utilizing a horizontal air source adapter, more commonly called an ASA), the less dense gaseous CO_{2} will rise to the top half of the tank. Normally, ASAs are angled slightly so the gaseous CO_{2} is always available at the valve of the tank. Special devices known as anti-siphon tubes extend the mouth of the valve, and provide only CO_{2} from the top part of the tank.

During rapid successions of shots, gaseous CO_{2} is used up. Liquid CO_{2} will take some time to evaporate and rebuild the internal pressure. This process causes potentially large changes in velocity and therefore, in accuracy and range.

=== High-pressure air or N_{2} ===
A Pure Energy N_{2} tank with a remote line attached

The newer high-pressure air (HPA) paintball markers use compressed air or nitrogen (N_{2}) for propulsion, to attempt to offset issues with other types of propellants such as CO_{2}. Due to nitrogen's low critical point, when pure nitrogen or air (which is 78% nitrogen) is compressed, it remains in gaseous form unless the temperature goes well below −140 °C (−220 °F). When it expands, the tank also cools due to the Joule-Thomson effect, but at a far lower rate than liquid CO_{2} because it does not have to phase-change from liquid to gas. The lack of vaporization reduces the variation in output gas pressure associated with rapid successions of firing cycles, improving accuracy and reducing the chance of "freeze-up" malfunctions.

However, because the propellant gas is stored at higher pressures (up to 34 MPa or 4,900 psi) while liquid CO_{2} is stored at around 8 MPa or 1,200 psi, HPA tanks need to be built to higher pressure ratings and are thus heavier and more expensive. The tanks themselves can either be filled with pure N_{2} or air (which is 78% N_{2}). Tanks smaller than 1.1 L (67 cu in) may not last heated matches, while larger tanks are cumbersome and require mounting options that create a larger marker profile.

There are two different kinds of HPA tanks in paintball. There are aluminium tanks which are preferred by younger players because while aluminium tanks are heavy and only hold about 21 MPa (3,000 psi), they are also much cheaper to buy (at about USD $50, only slightly more than CO_{2} tanks). The second kind of tank is made from carbon fiber, which is much lighter and stronger than aluminium (being able to contain 31 MPa or 4,500 psi and in some rare cases 35 MPa or 5,100 psi, as opposed to only 14 MPa or 2,100 psi that an aluminium tank will hold). Generally, carbon fiber tanks are preferred by more experienced players and buyers with a larger budget, because the qualities are very reliable and have proven themselves worthy of their generally hefty price tags.

HPA tanks are generally filled from specially designed air compressors which are made to create extremely high pressures (unlike shop compressors). Although HPA tanks may, in theory, be refilled from other sources such as a conventional scuba tank or an average general-purpose air compressor, the pressure available from these sources is far below the pressure that HPA tanks are designed for. For example, shop compressors create around 6,900–13,800 hPa (100–200 psi) range, an order of magnitude less than HPA tanks are designed for (typically in the range of 21–31 MPa or 3,000–4,500 psi). HPA tanks are filled from a nipple instead of the ASA valve, which allows them to be filled while the tank is still attached to the paintball marker.

=== Propane ===
In 2005, Tippmann introduced the Tippmann C3 with PEP (Propane Enhanced Performance); the first paintball gun to use propane as a propellent. This increased the number of balls that could be shot before needing to refill the tank (around 100 times more: which gives 50,000 shots per 470-millilitre tank), as well as having a lower gas pressure.

=== Comparison ===
Nitrogen is generally preferred over carbon dioxide for a few reasons. Nitrogen will not liquefy and leak into the marker, while if the CO_{2} tank does not have an anti-siphon tube installed, or if there is no expansion chamber or regulator, liquid CO_{2} can leak into the marker, causing damage to O-rings and dangerous overpressures. The solenoid valves on electro-pneumatic markers are particularly sensitive to this, and thus many manufacturers will specify to use only nitrogen or HPA with their electro-pneumatic markers.

Nitrogen is always controlled by 2 or more pressure regulators, and generally has a more consistent shot velocity than CO_{2}. This is because when the playing area is warm, the normally unregulated CO_{2} will expand more rapidly from the liquid form, causing the marker to fire at a higher velocity. When the temperature is lower, either a cool day, or from rapid firing of the marker, the expansion within the tank occurs more slowly, causing a decrease in the velocity of the subsequent shots. This is especially apparent during rapid firing while using unregulated CO_{2}. The cooling effect of rapid discharge of CO_{2} causes the temperature of the liquid CO_{2} to drop dramatically, resulting in a significant loss in overall pressure. This effect can be greatly overcome by the use of a regulator on the tank and one on the marker, and then setting the marker up to operate well on low pressure (about 400-600 psi). Most CO_{2} markers are designed to operate from a bare, unregulated tank of CO_{2}.

The proscribed act of placing a regulator at the neck of the tank will 'filter' most of any liquid escaping, but also reduce the pressure from the CO_{2} tank. The marker must therefore perform well under pressures significantly below the natural pressure of CO_{2}. The second regulator is used to modulate the final pressure to a point below what the CO_{2} tank can deliver when relatively cold (around 500–600 psi), or warm (900–1200 psi). A qualified air smith can perform the necessary changes inside the marker to accommodate the lower operating pressure. This adds some expense to the marker but does not require access to HPA or Nitrogen refilling facilities. Some markers prefer 900–1000 psi or more, and do not work well at the lower pressures provided by CO_{2}. This issue cannot be overcome with regulators.

Temperature has negligible effect on HPA or nitrogen, but CO_{2} tanks are significantly cheaper. Nitrogen tanks typically cost slightly less to fill than CO_{2} tanks, at approximately three to five US dollars. Also, many fields offer better rates for HPA fills due to the lower cost to the field; HPA is generally cheaper to procure as it has myriad industrial applications, and the field can even purchase the equipment to pressurize their own cylinders on-site. CO_{2}, on the other hand, must be separated from other gases before bottling, usually through super-cooling air to the condensation point of each gas, a process that requires far more sophisticated and expensive equipment when adding regulators to prevent liquid 'splash' and to avoid a sag in pressure.

== Masks ==
A typical paintball mask with a MARPAT cover

Sometimes called "goggles", masks are safety devices that players are required to wear. These completely cover the eyes, mouth, ears and nostrils of a person. Some masks even feature throat guards. The lenses are designed to protect against paintballs traveling up to 90 m/s (300 ft/s), but are not guaranteed to withstand impacts at greater speeds.

Double-layered or "thermal" lenses are also available. These lenses are much less prone to fogging. These work by separating an inside and an outside lens with an air chamber, that allows for the difference in temperature between the inside and the outside of the mask without forming condensation. However, if any moisture whatsoever somehow gets in between the two lenses, the inner faces of both lenses will fog, and it will take a very long time to dry out, if it does at all.

Fogging masks can be a significant hazard while playing. Besides the lost vision, players may be tempted to remove their mask and expose themselves to serious eye injuries. To reduce fogging of lenses while playing, some masks include electric fans that remove humidity and dry the lens. This is especially useful for situations that require wearing the mask for extended periods of time, such as wood play, large games, or being a referee. Finally, there are many anti-fog topical solutions that players can apply.

The exterior of the thermal lenses (or the lenses, in non-thermal masks) is usually made of Polycarbonate. This material provides excellent impact resistance. Because polycarbonate is soft, these lenses are manufactured with anti-scratch coatings. But great care must be taken to keep proper care of the lenses. Many vendors recommend the immediate replacement of very scratched lenses, or lenses subjected to very strong impacts.

Generally, more expensive masks tend to be smaller (which in turn makes the player a smaller target), more comfortable, have more interchangeable parts and be made of soft enough material to get some bounces.

While playing paintball, even just shooting at the ground or trees, wearing proper paintballing masks is mandatory for safety. Some paintballs are very thick and can bounce off the ground, and other objects, and hit people.

== Hoppers/loaders ==
Hoppers contain the paintball supply for a marker, much as magazines contain the ammunition on a regular rifle. With few exceptions, hoppers are all mounted above the marker, and most use gravity as the ultimate force to get the balls in the marker. If most hoppers are turned upside down, the marker will not be fed with balls and will cease to fire.

There are three main types: Gravity Feed, Agitated Feed, and Force Feed loaders.

Gravity Feed hoppers often get jammed up with balls at the feed neck, which can result in a marker 'dry firing' (firing without paint) or chopping balls due to the timing of the ball entering the marker. This is detrimental to the speed and performance of the marker.

Agitated Feed hoppers improve on the Gravity method of feeding the marker. Some use simple agitation levers or paddles inside the hopper to shake up the balls and guide them down the feed neck. Others (sometimes colloquially known as 'revies') use a paddle wheel inside the hopper to force any balls reaching the bottom of the hopper into the feed neck. Agitated Feeders need gravity to keep the balls rolling toward the bottom of the hopper before they can reach the loading mechanism.

Force Feed loaders create a stack of paint balls leading into the marker. Most of these hoppers maintain a constant tension on the ball stack to ensure that once a paintball is fired, a new one immediately takes its place. A special feed tube is sometimes used to allow placement of a hopper below the chamber, giving the marker a much lower profile. Any hopper-based loading system still relies on gravity to get paint into the drive portion of the loader itself. The 'Warp' loader uses an electric motor to rotate two silicone discs with ball-shaped divots, which add each ball to a stack headed down the feed tube into the chamber.

Helical Feed loaders are a form of Force Feed loader which use helix (or coil) shaped clips. In most designs, each clip is preloaded (typically before a match begins) with paintballs which are stacked under constant pressure to ensure a continuous feed of balls into the chamber. One drawback to this pressure is that paintballs stored in the clip will become deformed over time, causing jams or inaccuracy. Using a feed tube, these loaders can be mounted under a barrel. Helical feed loaders can fire continuously in any orientation. The 'Q-Loader' system uses a spring-driven clip, eliminating the potential noise of a motor-driven system. The 'Q-Loader' system is capable of loading 100 balls in less than 3 seconds, though breakage can occur at higher spring tensions.

There is some confusion about the term 'loader'. A loader typically refers to a powered or constant-pressure system, whereas gravity feed systems are generally referred to only as a hopper. In short, a loader system may include a hopper, and a hopper may function using gravity without any loader at all, but the two terms are often used interchangeably.

== Paintballs ==
Original Nelson paint tube produced around 1985 for oil-based paintballs.

Paintballs, also simply called "paint", are spherical gelatin capsules containing primarily polyethylene glycol, other non-toxic and water-soluble substances, and dye. Paintballs are made of materials found in food items, and are edible but taste disagreeable as they tend to dry up the mouth. The use of polyethylene glycol (a laxative) in the fill can also cause gastrointestinal distress in individuals who eat a number of paintballs; therefore, they should be kept out of reach of young children. Early paintballs were filled with inedible oil-based paint, since they were made for marking trees and cattle, but modern paintballs should easily wash out of most clothing. The color of the shell does not necessarily indicate the color of the fill.

Most common paintballs and paintball markers are described as .68 caliber (17.3 mm), but many factors affect the exact dimensions. Paintballs and barrels vary in size from .43 caliber to .71 caliber (11 mm to 18 mm). In addition, paintballs are seldom perfectly round and are very sensitive to heat and moisture. A hot or humid day may result in paint swelling or becoming misshapen. Care should be taken to keep paintballs out of the sun and away from moisture. An insulated cooler works well for this on the field.

The gelatin shell of a paintball is designed to break upon impact, although ricochets or "bounces" may occur. There are many types of paintballs, including glow in the dark paintballs for use at night, scented paintballs, and formulations for winter play. When dropped on the ground, groundwater or condensation may swell the paintball, which could cause a jam in the barrel or rupture and foul the internal workings of the marker. Dropped ammunition is known as 'loose paint', and should not be used in paintball markers.

Generally speaking, paintballs of greater price are subjected to more stringent manufacturing processes, quality checks, and standards, making their size and shape more consistent. This is very important for accuracy. Better paintballs also tend to have thinner shells to improve the frequency of breaking on impact rather than bouncing, and thicker, more opaque fills that are more visible and harder to wipe off.

While it is theoretically possible to freeze a water-based paintball, the polyethylene glycol additive drastically lowers the freezing point of the mixture, making it highly unlikely to actually freeze it into something harder than a regular paintball. When introduced to a very cold environment, the paintball's shell will most likely dimple (making it less accurate) and the shell will become brittle.

U.S. SWAT teams often use paintball-like balls, also known as pepper balls, filled with oleoresin capsicum, the active ingredient of pepper spray, as a non-lethal incapacitation method. However, pepperballs are shot at a higher velocity than is safe for paintball (above 110 m/s (360 ft/s)) and the shells are not made from gelatin, but rather a frangible plastic to make shots more painful for faster incapacitation. Pepperballs can be shot out of almost any paintball marker.

== Clothing ==
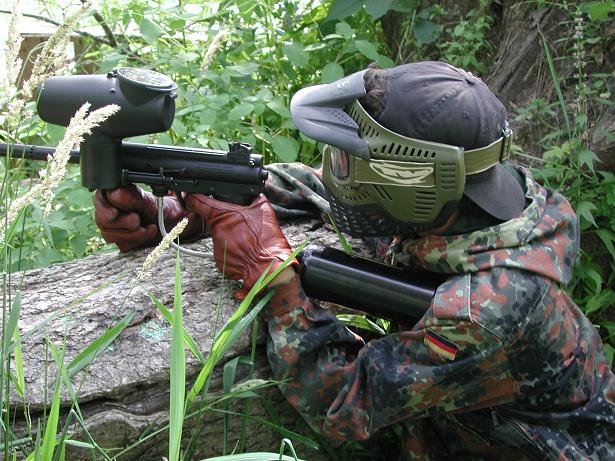
Woodsball players usually wear camouflage clothing.

Paintball clothing needs to be tough and durable. For woodsball, camouflage clothing is effective for blending in with the environment; players may wear army surplus military fatigues, Battle Dress Uniform (BDU), Army Combat Uniform (ACU) or DPM styles. For speedball, however, the small field and artificial obstacles make camouflage ineffective; players, therefore, will often choose to wear a brightly colored team uniform for ease of identification. For scenario games, players will tend to dress in a style appropriate to the character or force they are representing. In order to minimize the sting of close-range hits, players often wear extra layers of clothing padding as well.

Clothing worn for tournament paintballing is constrained by tournament rules, which prohibit thick padded materials likely to adversely affect the chance of paintballs breaking on the target. Players need adequate padding to protect the elbows and knees for slides on hard ground and chest protectors for shots to the chest. The player(s) could get seriously injured if these parts are not protected.

Footwear varies enormously between Speedball and Woodsball/scenario games. In woodsball, the rough terrain and uneven, often muddy ground makes footwear with good grip and plenty of ankle support a necessity. This lends itself to boots, either military-style or walking/hiking boots. In speedball, however, the added weight of thick boots is a distinct disadvantage, as is the reduction in mobility. Speedball players, therefore, tend to wear athletic shoes with soft cleats designed for field sports, such as soccer or football.

== Common accessories ==
=== Drop forward ===
A drop forward is a marker add-on which is used to reposition the air canister to a more comfortable position or one which improves the balance of the marker. They usually tilt the canister onto a slight angle and move it forward of its original position. They come in all shapes and sizes, however, so it is a personal preference which direction the tank is "dropped" - it is possible to mount the tank vertically, reversed or almost any other conceivable position. Most players use it to assist with balancing the marker, or to reduce its total length to make it more maneuverable (particularly if it has an extremely long barrel). Some marker designs do not permit the installation of a stock if the air cylinder is left in its standard location, necessitating a drop-forward if the player wishes to install a stock to improve accuracy.

There is a dispute among many players, however, that a drop forward will make the player's profile unnecessarily tall and wide, as the tank pushes the loader higher up above the head and may cause the player to hold his/her arms out wider in play to make up for the unnatural angle the drop will put on a grip.

=== Remote line ===
A remote line

A remote line is a hose (a gas line) which can be connected to a marker and to the tank, which allows the user more freedom of movement while handling the marker, because the tank can now be stored on a pod belt or in a pouch. Their utility lies in decreasing the weight and length of the marker, making it more maneuverable. However, they may get caught in trees and shrub, and if the tank is hit it still counts as a kill, even though it is on the player's back. Remote lines are not frequently used by tournament players, as it adds unnecessary weight (and the presence of the gas tank is factored into the design of tournament markers, making them extremely unbalanced if the tank is removed).

Some remote lines utilize a slide check as a valve.

=== Pod ===
A pod full of paintballs

Pods, also known as guppies or simply tubes, are rigid tubular plastic containers which hold paintballs. The most common pod size holds about 140 paintballs; however, other sizes are available, and 100 paintball pods are common at rental sites, while there are also pods for smaller paintball pistols which only have the capacity of 10 paintballs (such pods are usually called tubes). Standard pods use a spring-loaded plastic top to enable them to be opened quickly and single-handedly. There are variations - for example, Dye Lock Lid pods which use a simple locking mechanism to ensure they won't open accidentally, or Syn Shockpods, which are engineered to be able to be shaken vigorously without the paint inside breaking. The oldest and largest manufacturer of pods is Allen Paintball Products in Ohio, USA; they have been making paintball products since 1987.

=== Harness ===
Harnesses, or pod packs, are hip-worn belt packs or full vests that hold pods full of paintballs, and in some cases the player's gas tank if using a remote line.

Most hoppers hold about 200 paintballs, and many modern electropneumatic markers can empty a full hopper in 10 seconds of sustained fire. In woodsball, and especially in scenario paintball, a player may be away from a base at which they can reload for an extended period of time. In speedball, the necessity of suppressing fire requires a very large amount of paint for a single game or match. In both cases, a harness with pods allows a player to have a portable supply of paint, without weighing down his or her marker with an enormous hopper. Harnesses capable of carrying a tank in addition to pods are usually labeled with a +1 (e.g. A harness capable of carrying four pods and a tank would be labeled 4+1). In addition, newer harness design make use of collapsible "expansion sleeves" in between the "main" sleeves. Packs with expansion sleeves are generally labelled X+Y, for instance 4+5, and indicate the number of main sleeves followed by the number of expansion sleeves. Some packs have multiple "tiers" of expansions or extra sleeves in very different locations on the harness, and may be labelled 4+3+2 where the last number is the additional set of expansions.

Harnesses for speedball tend to consist of a bellyband with sleeves in the back for the pods, and are designed to carry widely varying amounts of paint while maintaining a small profile. They more often have expansion sleeves, though some woodsball harnesses feature them as well. Pods most often face lid-down, so that any pod can be reached by either of the player's hands and pulled out quickly, regardless of how the player is situated. Speedball harnesses rarely feature tank pouches; speedball players must refill tanks often, and switch hands often to lean out from the left or right of a bunker, both of which are made more complicated when using a remote line. For speed and convenience, speedball players often temporarily discard empty pods on the ground and retrieve them between games; for this reason, ease of reloading pods into the harness is often a secondary concern to player profile and ease of access.

Harnesses for woodsball have features designed to aid concealment, such as camouflage colors. Simpler harnesses consist of a belt pack with a number (usually 4, 6, or 8) of formed pockets for pods. They less often feature expansion sleeves (though some do). They are more likely to have the pockets side-facing, or in front of the player, which allows the player to more easily place an empty pod back in its pocket. This is necessary as discarding and retrieving "spent" pods is infeasible on a woodsball field consisting of many acres of dense forest. They usually, but not always, feature a tank pouch, allowing use of a remote line with a "mil-sim" marker for added realism.

=== Squeegee ===
A "cable" squeegee

Squeegees are used to clean out debris from the barrel and breach, including dirt/mud, paint and shells from broken paintballs, and residue from the shells' gelatin coating.

One common design is the "rod squeegee", and consists of a hinge-mounted rubber disc on the end of a plastic rod of sufficient length to reach the full length of the barrel. The rubber washer end is inserted sideways into the barrel, pushed to the bottom and subsequently withdrawn with the rubber disc rotated ninety degrees (so that the disc now touches the inner circumference of the barrel and scrapes the paint out). Such designs often place the hinged disk on an inner cable or rod that is manipulated by a trigger at the other end; by pulling the trigger, the disk is forced to rotate into contact with the barrel surface.

For situations where the marker's bolt or barrel can be quickly removed, a "cable squeegee" may be used. A cable squeegee is simply one or more rubber disks mounted perpendicular to a flexible metal cable (usually with a plastic jacket to avoid marring the barrel's surface). The end opposite the disc(s) (the "pull end") is inserted into the rear of the bolt chamber or the chamber side of the barrel, as appropriate, and fed through until the pull end protrudes from the front of the barrel. The squeegee is then pulled through the breech and/or barrel. Some designs incorporate a swab of an absorbent material that picks up anything the disc(s) leave behind. Because they require removal of the bolt or barrel, they are slower to use than a rod squeegee; however, being composed mainly of a flexible cable, they can be easily coiled up into a very compact size.

A "Battle Swab" is used commonly in speedball for extremely quick cleaning; a double-ended stick with soft absorbent fur is simply shoved down the length of the barrel to remove any performance-hindering paint or shell. The swab often has a bendable rubber section in the middle so that it can be folded over and stored in a pocket. Battle swabs generally do not clean as thoroughly as other methods, but they can be used in a few seconds where other methods take far longer.

Regardless of the design, as the squeegee is withdrawn, the barrel is perfunctorily cleaned to allow continued use of the marker. This allows the player to reduce the amount of paint or other debris in the marker, which can severely reduce accuracy, without having to remove themselves from play. A more thorough cleaning is recommended once time allows.

=== Barrel blocks ===
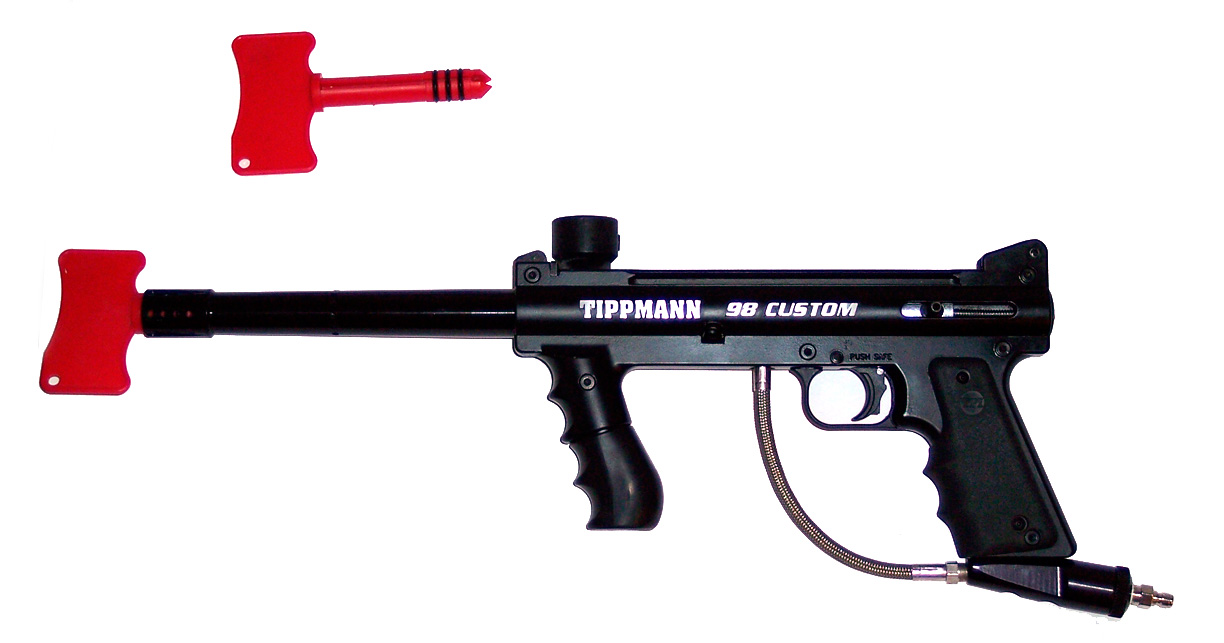
A barrel blocker in a Tippmann 98 Custom and by itself above.

A barrel block is a family of safety devices that mechanically obstruct the end of the marker's barrel. They are intended to ensure that, should all other safety devices incorporated in the marker fail or be deactivated, a paintball fired by the marker will not leave its barrel and cause injury. Barrel blocks are usually required by commercial fields, to be used on any marker that is in an area where masks are not required. Neglecting to replace it after leaving a game and entering a safe zone will usually earn a warning. Repeated infractions will often result in ejection from the site. This is done for liability reasons and to lower possibility of unexpected injury to anyone around, especially important when involving eye safety. There are two common types of barrel block:

- A barrel plug is a plastic or rubber plug that fits snugly into the muzzle end of the marker's barrel, like a wine cork. If made of plastic, they generally incorporate one or more rubber o-rings to provide friction against the barrel surface. These were the original and universal form of barrel block before the introduction of the barrel sock, but are now generally eschewed by players and fields in favor of barrel socks. When using a barrel plug, if a paintball is fired, it will break against the plug in the barrel, lining the barrel with paint and drastically affecting accuracy until the barrel can be squeegeed. Barrel plugs can also be hard to remove and install properly; the high friction that keeps the plug in place when needed also inhibits its intentional removal. The force of the paintball impacting against the plug is often enough to dislodge it; with modern electronic markers having "automatic" and "burst" modes of fire, a single pull of the trigger may be enough to expel the barrel plug from the barrel, which can cause injury in itself, and also exposes those nearby to any further shots leaving the barrel after the plug has been expelled. Barrel plugs, therefore, are not an absolute safety against accidental marker discharge and eye injury.
- Barrel socks, also commonly called barrel sleeves or barrel condoms, are a newer form of barrel block, and consist of a cloth pouch with an adjustable elastic cord. The pouch is placed over the muzzle of the marker, and the elastic cord is stretched over the feed neck of the marker, and tightened so the pouch is kept securely on the muzzle. If a paintball is fired, it will exit the muzzle and be caught immediately by the pouch. Barrel socks have several advantages over barrel plugs. First, if a paintball is fired, it will generally break in the pouch after leaving the barrel. This generally results in less mess inside the barrel itself (though it is generally still necessary to clean the barrel afterward). Barrel socks are also easy to install and remove; a properly adjusted sock can simply be lifted off by the player against the force of the elastic; it can be completely removed from the marker, or for convenience it can be left hanging by its cord from the feed neck, allowing it to be put back in place at a moment's notice. Most importantly, a barrel sock, with the cord properly tightened, will remain in place over the barrel even after repeated shots, and thus it provides a far more reliable barrier against unintentional shots causing injury. Most fields use a product called a 'Barrel Capp' for their rental equipment.

== Other equipment ==
=== Paint grenades ===
Although not legal in tournament play, paint grenades may be found in recreational and scenario play. There are two kinds of grenades in use:

- Non-explosive grenades are generally closer to water balloons in function. One common grenade design consists of a rubber tube sealed securely at one end and more loosely at the other, with an arming pin which, when pulled, loosens that end. The tube is filled with paint under pressure, usually from a syringe. When the grenade is thrown against a hard surface, the loose end of the tube is unsealed, and the paint is sprayed over a wide area, potentially marking players. Another common design consists of a small compressed CO_{2} tank surrounded by a container of paint.
- Explosive paint grenades are powered by a small black powder "banger", tipped with a short time-fuse. A small plastic bag of paint is wrapped around this, and the whole assembly is contained in a breakable fibre case (usually segmented to resemble a WWII-era grenade). The end of the fuse protrudes from the top of the casing, and is tipped with a friction-sensitive material similar to the head of a match. This is then covered with a removable cap as a form of "safety catch". To fire the grenade, the cap is removed and its specially roughened outer surface is struck against the fuse, igniting it. The grenade is immediately thrown; the fuse burns down to the tightly packed black powder in two or three seconds and the grenade explodes.

This paint is normally a different color to the fill of the normal paintballs used on that field, as spray from a grenade (by definition) must count as a kill. Under most rules, any mark from a paint grenade is sufficient to count as an elimination.

=== Grenade launcher ===
Paintball grenade launchers are used in recreational and scenario paintball games to launch paint grenades. They are more accurate than throwing a paint grenade, which gives an advantage. Tippmann products such as the X7 are able to have a grenade launcher attached.

=== Paint mines ===
Paint mines are simulated land mines for use in paintball. Several devices have been designed to spray paint over an area when triggered by passing players. Some of these devices are placed on the ground; once a person steps on one, paint shoots up and around the target, marking nearby players.

=== Smoke grenades ===
Smoke grenades, also used in military and law enforcement training, may be allowed in a paintball game. In tournament paintball the use of smoke grenades or any other explosive is strictly prohibited. The grenades create a screen of smoke which can obscure the movement of players and make it more difficult for the opposition to hit them. Some large-scale scenarios use military-issue smoke grenades, but for recreational use, smaller commercial 'smokes' are preferred (due mainly to cost and convenience).

=== Thunderflashes ===
Alongside paint and smoke grenades, many recreational paintball venues sell small thunderflashes for use during games. These are effectively black-powder fireworks which explode with a loud bang, but have a sufficiently small blast to be thrown at opposing players with reasonable safety (provided they do not attempt to pick them up). They are used in the same way as the explosive paint grenades described above.

In practice, thunderflashes have little purpose in a paintball game; their effectiveness at their supposed task of disorienting the enemy is dubious. Nevertheless, they are popular with occasional players, presumably in emulation of the much bigger flashbangs used by the military.

=== Slingshots ===
A variation of paintball uses slingshots instead of markers to propel the paintballs. Because slingshots may shoot faster than 90 m/s (300 ft/s), sometimes up to 150 m/s (490 ft/s), most paintball fields don't allow them. A normal game usually requires all players to use slingshots, but some games may allow certain players to use pump-action markers vs. slingshots, such as Cowboys and Indians.

=== Airow gun ===
The Airow gun uses a combination of mechanical and pneumatic power to convert the energy from a compound, or recurve bow. The energy released is generally equivalent to the power generated by a marker. Entire games have been dedicated to the use of Airow Guns, in a fashion similar to that of slingshot paintball.

=== Paintball bazooka ===
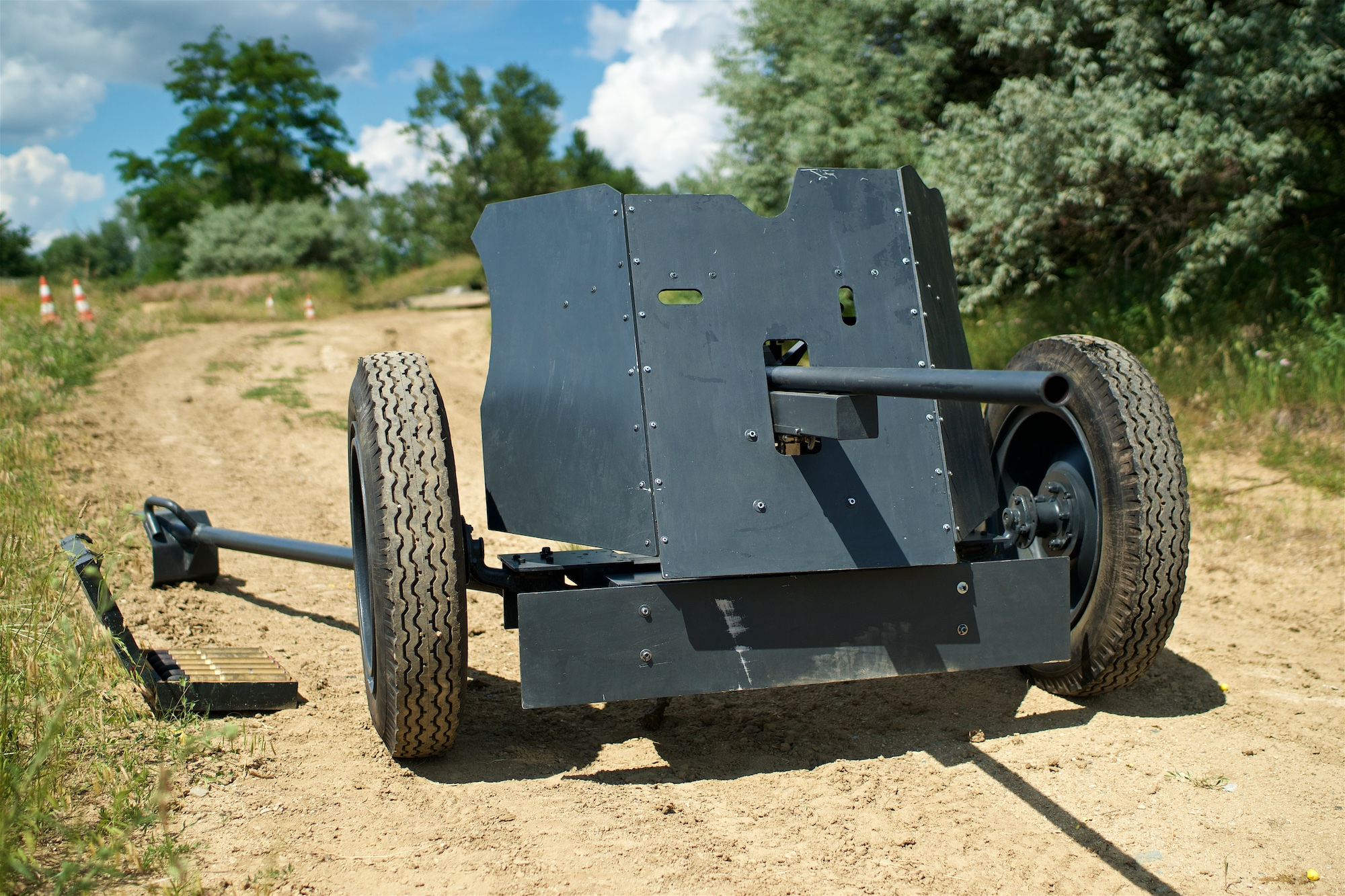
A paintball anti-tank gun. This one has an effective range of 140 meters.

A "paintball bazooka", or a "paintball rocket launcher" is usually a spud gun styled to resemble some existing AT weapon to specifically "kill", or "take out" paintball tanks. Modified and masked paintball markers serving the same purpose are also used. Most often they fire soft foam rockets, purpose-built marking ammunition, home-made ammo, or a cluster of paintballs.

They are predominantly used against vehicles and fortifications only for safety reasons (firing massed paintballs is an exception). The hard home-made projectiles these devices sometimes fire can potentially injure a player. Replicas of various existing weapons such as RPGs, bazookas, the panzerfaust, and the PIAT are available.

=== Paintball artillery ===
Paintball artillery ranges from howitzers, through mortars to anti-tank guns. These paintball weapons are usually made of PVC and wood combination, but heavy-metal steel replicas do sometimes appear. Their ammunition ranges from firing a cluster of paintballs, small water balloons, through small pyro-grenades (used in some mortars) to foam rockets.

Foam rockets are the most common ammunition for anti-tank guns. Some AT guns are using soft and fragile marking ammunition instead.

== Vehicles ==
Paintball tanks are a wide variety of vehicles sometimes used in woodsball events to eliminate large numbers of opponents by using protection and superior firepower. They can range from golf carts covered in plywood to real military tanks with real guns converted to fire paintballs. Many paintball sponsors and businesses sometimes have their own paintball tanks which they take to events. Although local paintball parks usually don't make use of vehicles (since the cost of the vehicle and its maintenance can be prohibitive), tournaments and other 'sponsored' events will often feature several.

=== Mechanised paintball ===
As well as infantry-based paintballing, there are also opportunities to take part in more mechanised versions. A number of companies offer experience days featuring an opportunity to drive a "tank" (often actually an armoured personnel carrier) fitted with a paintball "gun". Two such vehicles are then driven around a course, each trying to inflict more paint damage on the other. In a similar vein, Radio-controlled model tanks (typically around 1:6 scale) can also be fitted with paintball markers and used in a similar way.
