= Timeline of the Russo-Ukrainian war (8 June 2023 – 31 August 2023) =

Daily log of an ongoing military conflict

Timeline of the Russo-Ukrainian war (2022–present)
- Prelude; (up to 23 February 2022); Initial invasion; (24 February – 7 April 2022); Southeastern front; (8 April – 28 August 2022); 2022 Ukrainian counteroffensives; (29 August – 11 November 2022); Second stalemate; (12 November 2022 – 7 June 2023); 2023 Ukrainian counteroffensive; (8 June 2023 – 31 August 2023); 2023 Ukrainian counteroffensive, cont.; (1 September – 30 November 2023); 2023–2024 winter campaigns; (1 December 2023 – 31 March 2024); 2024 spring and summer campaigns; (1 April – 31 July 2024); 2024 summer–autumn offensives; (1 August – 31 December 2024); 2025 winter–spring offensives; (1 January 2025 – 31 May 2025); 2025 summer offensives; (1 June 2025 – 31 August 2025); 2025 autumn–winter offensives; (1 September 2025 – 31 December 2025); 2026 winter–spring offensives; (1 January 2026 – 31 May 2026); 2026 summer offensives; (1 June 2026 – 31 August 2026); 2026 autumn–winter offensives; (1 September 2026 – present)

This timeline of the Russo-Ukrainian war covers the period from 8 June 2023, when the 2023 Ukrainian counteroffensive began, to 31 August 2023.

== June 2023 ==
=== 8 June ===
Several newspapers and analysts reported that Ukraine's counteroffensive had begun, with the Institute for the Study of War noting that activity throughout Ukraine was consistent with a variety of indicators that counteroffensive operations were underway across the theater.

In the early hours of the counteroffensive, the Armed Forces of Ukraine suffered "significant losses" according to US officials and the Russian Ministry of Defence, but seemingly managed to break some lines of defence in Zaporizhzhia Oblast. According to US officials, the losses were not expected to impact Ukraine's counteroffensive as a whole. The Russian Defence Ministry said its forces had repelled an offensive by Ukrainian forces involving 1,500 soldiers and 150 armoured vehicles after a two-hour battle with Ukrainian troops in the early hours. In response, Ukrainian Deputy Defence Minister Hanna Maliar said only that Russia was conducting "defensive actions" near Orikhiv.

Three people, including a child were reported to have been killed by Russian shelling in Ukrainsk, Donetsk Oblast. One person was killed and eight others were wounded after Russian shelling struck a flood evacuation point in Kherson.

In Russia, drones struck two settlements in Belgorod Oblast.

The Russian Orthodox Church transferred 11 Ukrainian POWs from Zakarpattia Oblast to Hungary, saying that it was a request by the Hungarian government. But despite assurances by the office of Prime Minister Viktor Orban that the prisoners arrived of their own volition and were free to leave the country, the Ukrainian Foreign Ministry said the Hungarians ignored their requests to contact them, adding that the transfer was conducted without the agreement of the Ukrainian government. On 20 June, three of the POWs were returned to Ukraine.

The United Kingdom imposed new sanctions on Belarus for its support for the Russian invasion of Ukraine, which included banning imports of gold, cement, wood and rubber from Belarus and blocking exports to Belarus of banknotes and machinery, as well as materials that could be used to produce chemical and biological weapons.

As part of NATO's efforts to secure its border with Ukraine, Germany announced it would donate two MANTIS Air Defence Systems to Slovakia.

=== 9 June ===
One person was killed and three others injured in a Russian air strike in Zviahel, Zhytomyr Oblast. Eight people were wounded in another attack in Uman. The Ukrainian military said they shot down four out of six missiles launched during the attacks.

According to OSINT Defender, an Open Source Intelligence website, the Ukrainian counteroffensive started towards the town of Tokmak in Zaporizhzhia Oblast with a mixture of Leopard tanks and Bradley fighting vehicles. A Russian military spokesman claimed its forces had destroyed 13 tanks in Zaporizhzhia and eight in Donetsk.

The Security Service of Ukraine posted an intercepted call on its Telegram channel that claimed to show Russia's responsibility for the Kakhovka Dam's destruction. The call, which news agency Reuters could not immediately verify, was between two Russian-speaking men, with one of whom, described by the Ukraine security service as a Russian soldier, saying that the action at the dam was by a sabotage group under Russian command, and was supposed to "scare" people but "[the group did] more than what they planned for."

In Russia, three people were wounded by a drone strike on a residential building in Voronezh. A state of emergency was later declared in the region.

President Vladimir Putin said Russia would begin deploying tactical nuclear weapons in Belarus after the staging facilities are ready on 7–8 July. He also said during an interview published on Telegram that the Ukrainian offensive had begun.

Belgium announced it would supply Ukraine with 105mm artillery rounds worth 32.4 million euros ($35 million), which would be purchased from Belgian industry and delivered as soon as possible.

=== 10 June ===
During a nighttime attack on Odesa, Russian forces fired two missiles and eight drones. Ukrainian officials reported that all had been shot down. Falling drone debris set fire to an apartment building killing three people. Another 27, including three children, were wounded. An airfield in Poltava Oblast was damaged by missiles. One person was killed in an attack in Kharkiv Oblast. Two people, including a nurse were killed by Russian shelling at a hospital in Huliaipole, Zaporizhzhia Oblast. The Ukrainian military claimed to have advanced 1.2 kilometers (0.75 miles) near Bakhmut over the past 24 hours.

During a surprise visit by Canadian Prime Minister Justin Trudeau to Kyiv, Ukrainian President Volodymyr Zelenskyy acknowledged the start of the country's counteroffensive against Russia. Trudeau also announced 500 million Canadian dollars (£297 million) in new military aid for Ukraine.

Radio New Zealand (RNZ) launched an external investigation after discovering that some 15 stories about the war in Ukraine "were edited to align with the Russian view of events" to give a "false account" of the conflict. The station's executive later apologized, admitting that RNZ's editorial systems had been insufficiently robust, while a digital journalist was placed on leave.

In Russia, a freight train with fifteen cars was derailed in Belgorod Oblast. No casualties were reported.

=== 11 June ===
Ukraine announced the liberation of the villages of Blahodatne, Makarivka and Neskuchne in Donetsk Oblast, the first settlements it had taken since the start of the counteroffensive. The Russian defence ministry claimed Ukrainian speedboats tried to attack the reconnaissance vessel Priazovye in the Black Sea.

A prisoner swap occurred between Russian and Ukrainian POWs, with 94 Russians swapped for 95 Ukrainians.

In Russia, a suspected Ukrainian drone crashed near the village of Strelkovka in Kaluga Oblast.

Russian Defence Minister Sergei Shoigu ordered all volunteer fighting groups to sign a contract with the ministry, calling it a step towards increasing the effectiveness of Russian forces in Ukraine. However, the Wagner Group's head Yevgeny Prigozhin insisted that they were not covered by the order. Russian media reported it was an attempt by Shoigu to rein in Wagner following Prigozhin's previous outbursts against the military establishment.

=== 12 June ===
Ukraine announced it had retaken seven villages in Zaporizhzhia and Donetsk Oblasts, including the settlements of Lobkove, Levadne, Novodarivka and Storozheve. It also accused Russia of blowing up a dam near Novodarivka that resulted in flooding along the Mokri Yaly river.

Three people were killed after Russian forces opened fire on a flood evacuation boat in Kherson Oblast. One person was killed by Russian bombing in Orikhiv, while another was killed in Kostiantynivka, Donetsk Oblast. Two people were injured in a Russian attack in Avdiivka, Donetsk Oblast.

Major-General Sergei Goryachev, chief of staff of the Russian 35th Combined Arms Army, was reported to have been killed in a Ukrainian missile strike in the Zaporizhzhia front.

The Russian defence ministry signed a contract with Chechen Akhmat special forces fighting in Marinka, Donetsk Oblast as part of its moves towards consolidating control over allied paramilitary forces.

The United States announced a new aid package that would include "roughly two dozen Bradleys and Strykers" to replace those damaged or destroyed in previous fighting. The US had donated some 90 Strykers and 109 Bradleys to Ukraine. Some 16 Bradleys had been lost during the 2023 counteroffensive. The package also included more ammunition for HIMARS and NASAMS systems.

=== 13 June ===
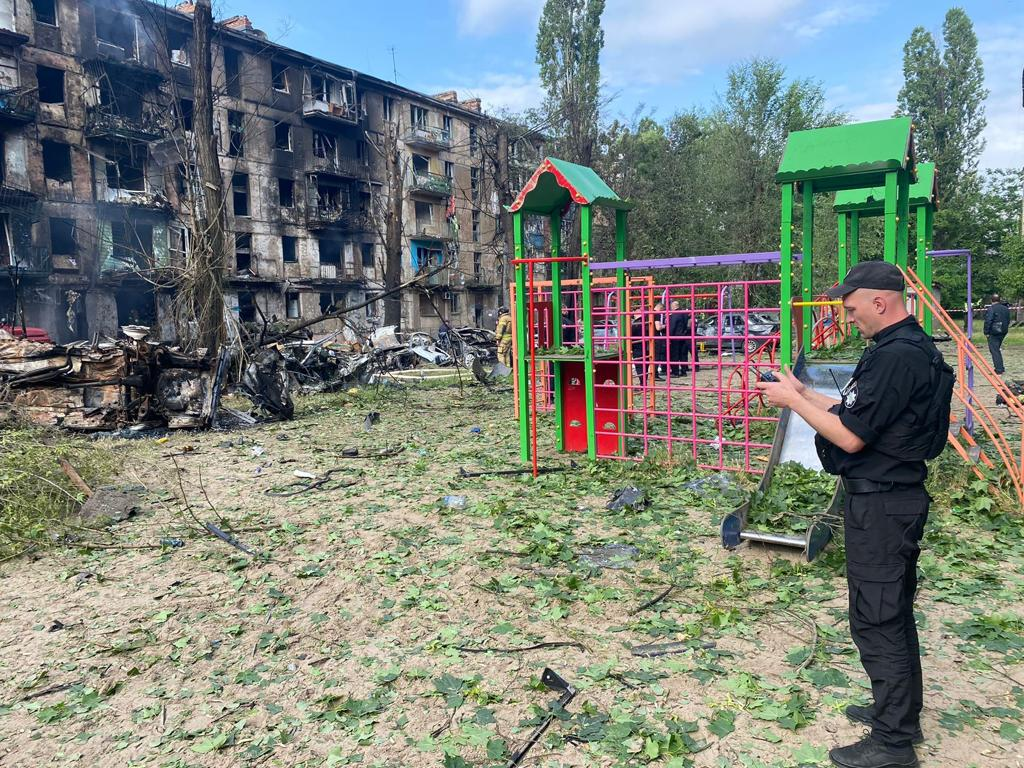
Damaged residential building in Kryvyi Rih

A Russian airstrike hit a five-story residential building in Kryvyi Rih, killing 12 people and wounding 36. Attacks were also reported in Kyiv and Kharkiv. The Ukrainian military command said that they shot down ten out of fourteen cruise missiles and one of four "Iranian made drones". An elderly priest was killed by Russian shelling in Bilozerka, Kherson Oblast. Seven people were killed by Russian shelling across Sumy Oblast. Six of them, which included four forestry workers, were inside a van that was shelled near Seredyna-Buda, close to the international border.

In a meeting with military journalists and bloggers, President Putin claimed Ukraine had lost 160 tanks and more than 360 other armoured vehicles since the start of its counteroffensive, while Russia lost 54 tanks. He further acknowledged that there were shortages of precision-guided munitions, communications equipment, aircraft, drones and other military equipment.

Belarusian President Aleksandr Lukashenko said his country had received the first delivery of tactical nuclear weapons from Russia and threatened to use them if necessary, contradicting statements from Vladimir Putin that the delivery would take place in July and would only be at the disposal of Russia.

=== 14 June ===
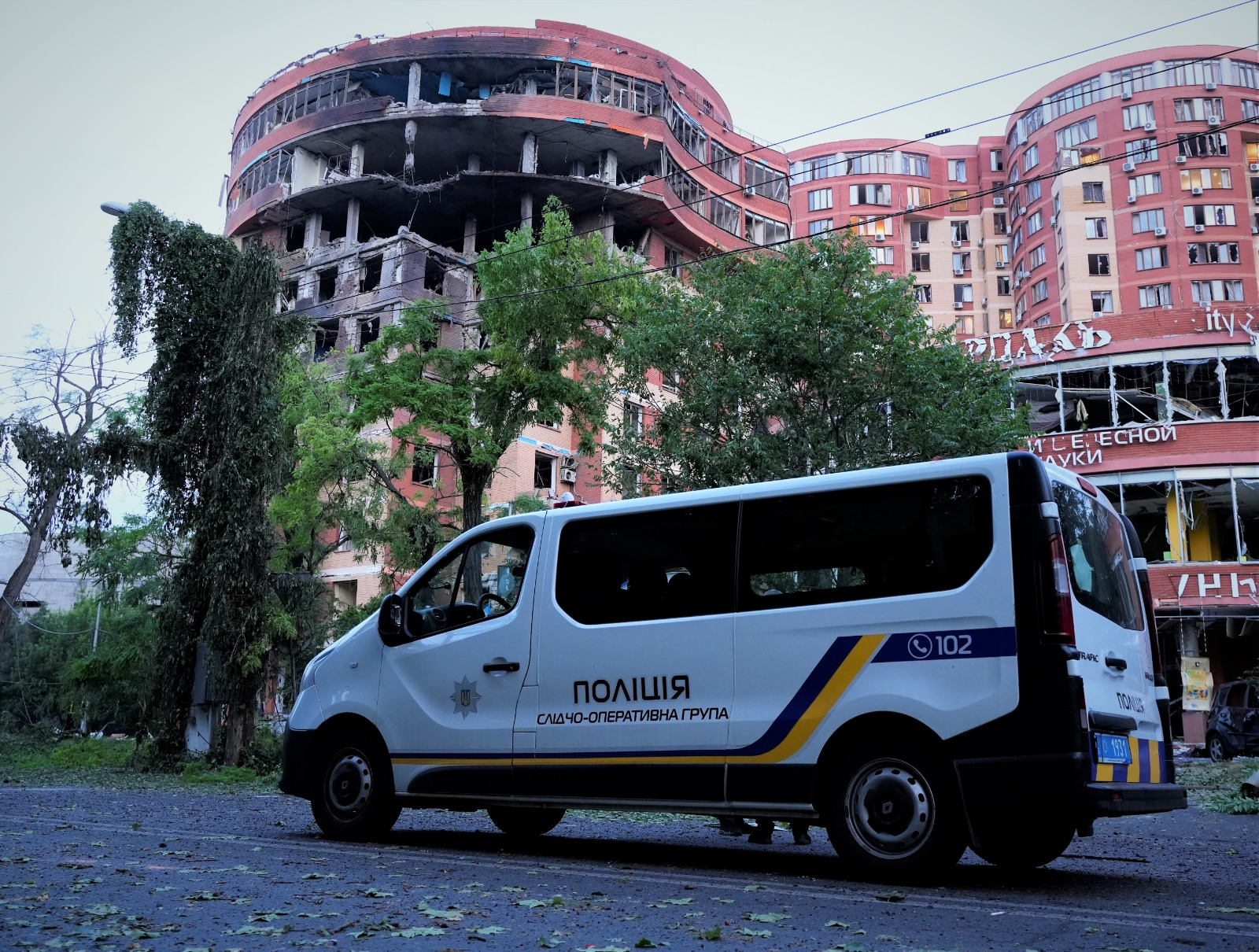
Destroyed building in Odesa

Four people were killed and 13 others were injured after a Russian missile attack on Odesa. The Ukrainian military said four Kalibr cruise missiles were launched at the city and said it had shot down three. The dead were retail employees who died after a missile struck a warehouse, causing a fire. Missile debris also damaged a business center, an educational institution, a residential complex, and shops in the city center. Four people were also killed in Russian attacks in Donetsk Oblast. Two people were killed by Russian shelling in Zaporizhzhia and Chernihiv Oblasts respectively

Pro-Russian officials claimed one person was injured by Ukrainian shelling in Nova Kakhovka. Ukrainian forces claimed to have retaken at least 90 square kilometres (35 square miles) of territory since starting their counteroffensive and advanced by some 200–500 metres towards Bakhmut, and 300–500 metres in the Zaporizhzhia front.

Adam Delimkhanov, commander of the Chechen contingent of the Russian National Guard and member of the Russian State Duma, was reportedly wounded in action in Ukraine according to Russian sources, while Ukrainian sources reported that he had been killed by an artillery strike in Prymorsk, Zaporizhzhia Oblast.

=== 15 June ===
One person was injured in Kryvyi Rih as Russian missiles and drones were launched overnight across Ukraine. The Ukrainian military claimed to have intercepted 20 drones and one missile. An elderly woman was killed by Russian shelling in Zelenivka, Kherson Oblast.

Nine drones were reported to have attacked Russian-occupied Crimea.

On the southern front, Ukrainian forces claimed to have advanced by up to 7 kilometers (4.4 miles) along the Mokry Yali river, as well as up to 3 kilometers (1.8 miles) near Mala Tokmachka.

In Russia, a war crimes trial against 22 members of the Azov Brigade captured during the Siege of Mariupol started in Rostov. Fighters from the Chechen Zapad-Akhmat battalion were deployed to Belgorod Oblast to deter cross-border attacks.

The Russian Defense Ministry claimed to have struck drone production facilities in Ukraine using high-precision, long-range weapons and intercepted five US-built HIMARS-launched missiles and shot down 25 drones.

Russia announced plans to hold local elections scheduled on 10 September in occupied regions of Ukraine that it illegally annexed after the 2022 invasion.

=== 16 June ===
Another Russian air attack was launched on Kyiv while a delegation composed of five African leaders was visiting the Ukrainian capital as part of a peace mission between the warring sides. The delegation, which included South African President Cyril Ramaphosa, Senegalese President Macky Sall, Zambian President Hakainde Hichilema, Comoran President and concurrent African Union chair Azali Assoumani and Egyptian Prime Minister Mostafa Madbouly, were safely secured into a bomb shelter. The Ukrainian air force said it shot down six Kalibr cruise missiles, six Kinzhal hypersonic ballistic missiles and two reconnaissance drones. Four people were wounded in the attack, while 23 others were also injured in a separate attack in Kherson.

Germany announced it was sending 64 Patriot missiles to Ukraine to bolster its air defenses.

=== 17 June ===
Four people were killed after a Russian missile struck a car near Huriv Kozachok in Kharkiv Oblast. One person was killed and three others wounded in a Russian airstrike in Kozatske, Kherson Oblast.

In Russia, three drones were shot down in an attack on the Druzhba oil refinery in Bryansk Oblast.

President Putin confirmed the deployment of tactical nuclear weapons in Belarus, claiming that this was "an element of deterrence" directed at those in the West who sought a "strategic defeat" for Russia.

=== 18 June ===
Ukrainian forces claimed to have destroyed a "significant" ammunition dump near Henichesk, Kherson Oblast. A Russian-installed official in Zaporizhzhia Oblast confirmed the recovery of the village of Piatykhatky by Ukrainian forces.

Two people were killed by Russian shelling in Bilopillia, Sumy Oblast, while another was killed in Tonenke, Donetsk Oblast.

=== 19 June ===
In Russia, the governor of Belgorod Oblast claimed that seven people were injured by bombing in Valuyki.

The Ukrainian Defence Ministry announced that its forces had retaken a total of 113 square kilometres (44 square miles) since the start of its counteroffensive and advanced up to 7 kilometers in the direction of Melitopol. It also estimated Russian losses at 4,600 personnel killed or wounded and 400 pieces of hardware destroyed. Meanwhile, the Russian defence ministry said its forces had repelled 263 Ukrainian attacks since 4 June.

The Danish Defence Ministry announced another package of military aid for Ukraine worth around $3.2 billion to be delivered from 2023 to 2028, which would include weapons, military equipment, emergency equipment, and training support.

=== 20 June ===
Russia launched another wave of overnight airstrikes across Ukraine, with attacks being reported in Kyiv, Lviv, Zaporizhzhia and Mykolaiv. The Ukrainian military claimed to have shot down 28 out of 30 Shahed drones over Kyiv and three more in Mykolaiv. Two people were killed in separate attacks in Kherson and Sumy Oblast.

Russian-installed officials claimed that one person was killed and four others injured by a Ukrainian drone strike in Nova Kakhovka.

The Ukrainian military claimed to have destroyed or damaged 46 units of Russian military equipment and inflicted the loss of five Russian army companies in the southern front.

The Ukrainian Defence Ministry said 30,000 soldiers were to be trained in EU countries under the European Union Military Assistance Mission in support of Ukraine (EUMAM).

The Russian State Duma approved legislation that would give pardons to convicted criminals who would fight in Ukraine, promising the expungement of criminal records of those who complete military service, suffer combat-related injuries or reach the mandatory retirement age of 65. Suspects who agreed to fight in Ukraine were also to be given reprieves. However, the law barred people convicted of terrorist, sexual, espionage and treasonous offenses from availing.

Ukraine's arms manufacturer Ukroboronprom claimed to have built a drone with a range of up to 1,000 kilometers.

=== 21 June ===
Four people were injured in a suspected missile attack by Russian forces in Pokrovsk, Donetsk Oblast.

The Ukrainian military claimed to have shot down a Russian Mi-24 helicopter.

The European Union announced its 11th round of sanctions against Russia over the invasion of Ukraine, imposing restrictions on the sale of sensitive dual-use goods and technology to third countries that might sell it on to Russia and banning the entry of 71 persons and 33 entities to the EU for their involvement in the deportation of Ukrainian children to Russia. Latvian Prime Minister Krišjānis Kariņš announced that it was completing the transfer of his country's military helicopter fleet to Ukraine.

=== 22 June ===
The Russian-installed governor of Kherson Oblast, Vladimir Saldo, claimed that a Ukrainian missile struck the Chonhar bridge linking Crimea to the Ukrainian mainland, saying that a Storm Shadow missile was likely used. No casualties were reported but traffic was rerouted. Explosions were also reported in Dzhankoi.

Russia launched another wave of missile and drone strikes across Ukraine, with attacks reported in Kryvyi Rih and Odesa. One person was killed in a separate attack in Chasiv Yar, Donetsk Oblast, while 13 others were injured in attacks across 10 oblasts.

The SBU arrested a resident of Mykolaiv suspected of providing the Russian military intelligence agency GRU with information on the location and movement of Ukrainian military vehicles and directing Russian fire upon a shipyard that injured six people and damaged several houses.

In Russia, a drone attack was reported in Kursk, while in Belarus, an Mi-24 helicopter reportedly belonging to the Russian Air Force crash-landed in Brest Region.

President Zelenskyy signed a law banning the import and distribution of books from Russia and Belarus. He also claimed that Russia was planning a "terrorist attack" on the Zaporizhzhia Nuclear Power Plant involving the leakage of radiation, citing intelligence reports.

The EU announced the transfer of 1.5 billion euros to Ukraine in macro-financial assistance.

The United Nations placed Russia on its "list of shame" over the killing and injuring of children in its invasion of Ukraine adding that 477 children had been killed in Ukraine over the past year, mostly in air attacks. 136 deaths were directly attributed to Russian forces and allied groups, while 80 were blamed on Ukrainian forces and the rest could not be determined.

=== 23 June ===
==== Ukraine ====
The Ukrainian Air Force said it had destroyed 13 Russian missiles and one drone that targeted an air base in Khmelnytskyi Oblast. Two people were killed and four others were injured after Russian shelling struck a transport company building in Kherson.

The Turkish drone company Baykar issued licenses to manufacture drones in Ukraine, with production of Bayraktar and Akınc combat drones expected to commence in 2025. Ukrainian Minister for Strategic Industries Oleksandr Kamyshin later confirmed that construction of Baykar's manufacturing facility in Ukraine had already begun.

The head of Ukrainian Military Intelligence, Kyrylo Budanov, claimed in an interview to the New Statesman that Russia had approved of a plan to sabotage the Zaporizhzhia Nuclear Power Plant and blame it on Ukraine, adding that explosives had been placed across the facility. However, inspections by the International Atomic Energy Agency (IAEA) failed to find any evidence for this.

==== Wagner rebellion ====
Wagner Group leader Yevgeny Prigozhin alleged that his soldiers' positions were shelled by the Russian Ministry of Defense, killing 2,000 of them. He promised to take revenge, announcing a mutiny against the Russian military leadership, insisting that it was a "march of justice" against the military leadership and asked for regular military units to stay out of his way or be destroyed, and for civilians to stay at home. The FSB issued a warrant for his arrest and asked Wagner soldiers to not follow his orders, calling his actions an incitement towards "civil conflict".

Prigozhin claimed that he had entered Rostov Oblast. Governor Vasily Golubev told citizens to stay indoors. Prigozhin claimed that Wagner forces shot down a Russian helicopter.

=== 24 June ===
==== Ukraine ====
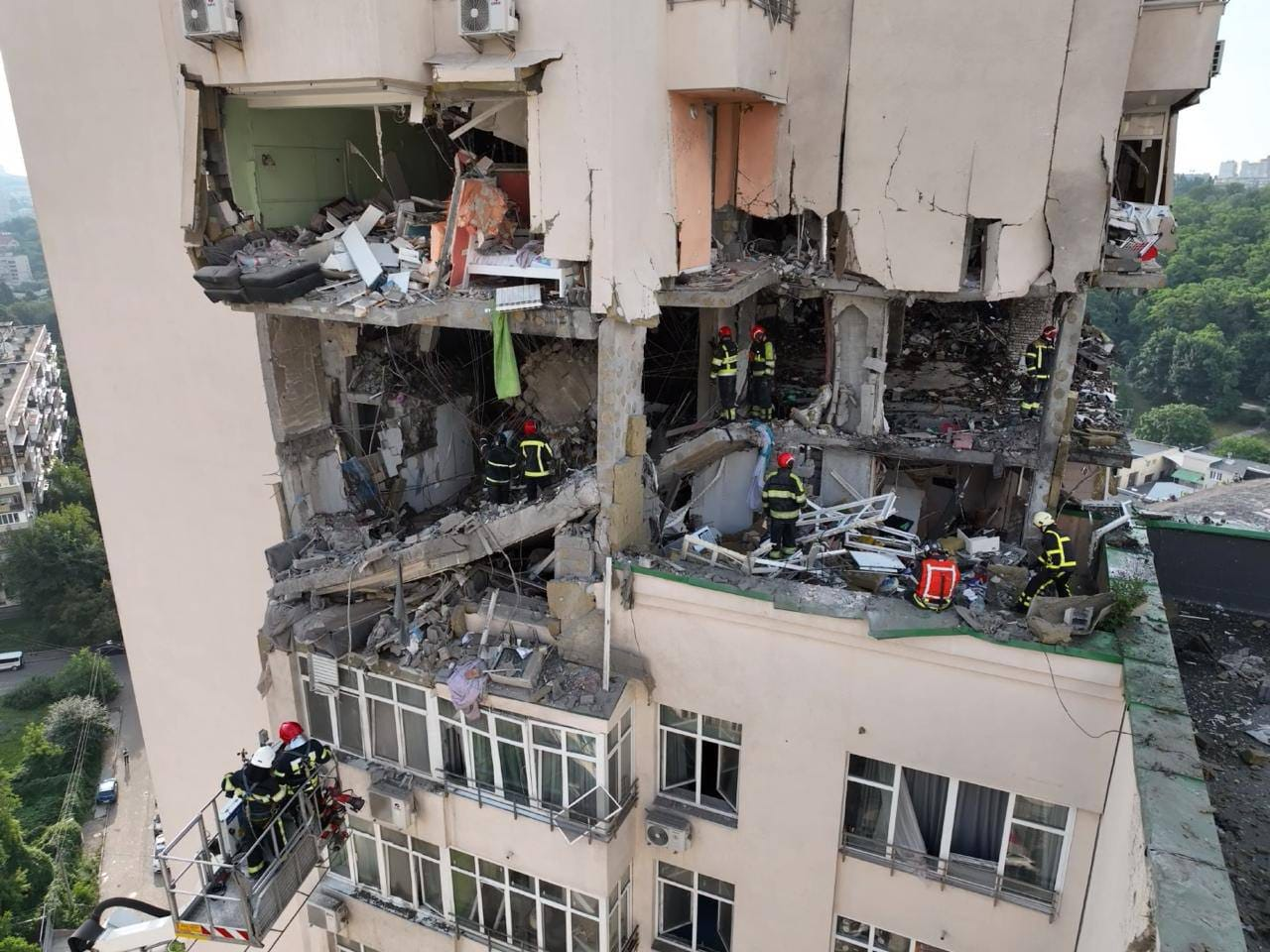
Damaged 25-storey residential building in Kyiv

Russia launched another wave of air attacks across cities in Ukraine. Five people were killed and 11 wounded after a high-rise was struck in Kyiv's Solomianskyi District. Eight people were wounded in Dnipro. Attacks were also recorded in Kharkiv. The Ukrainian military said it had shot down 50 missiles and five drones.

One person was killed by Russian shelling in Nikopol, Dnipropetrovsk Oblast.

==== Wagner rebellion ====
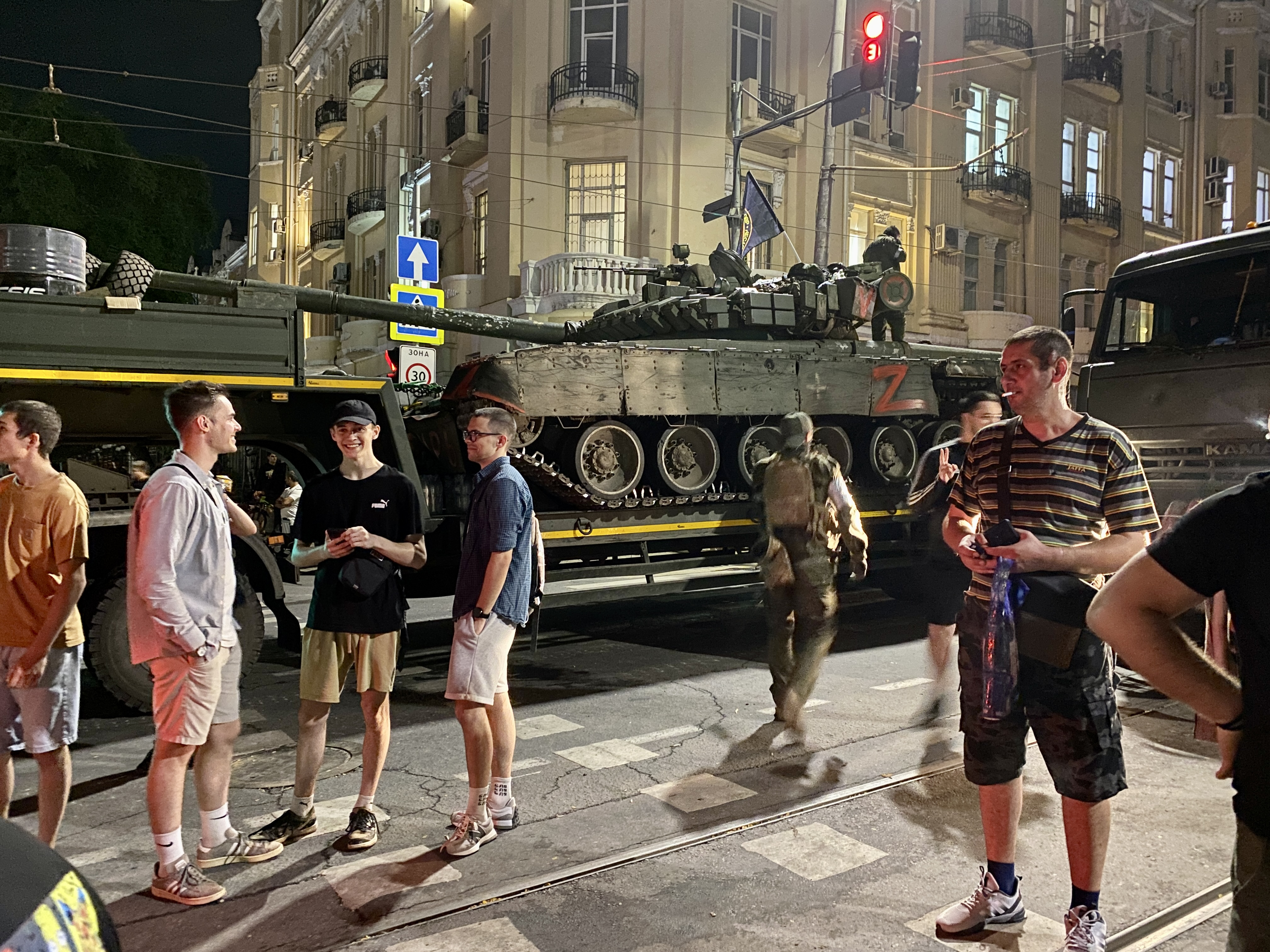
Rostov-on-Don residents standing next to a Wagner convoy late on 24 June

Wagner Group leader Yevgeny Prigozhin claimed in an audio message that he had "25,000" fighters at his disposal, including soldiers who defected from the Russian army. Prosecutor General Igor Krasnov opened a criminal case against Prigozhin for "armed rebellion". The M4 highway between Lipetsk Oblast and Voronezh Oblasts was closed after the governor of Lipetsk, Igor Artamonov, claimed that a convoy of military vehicles had used the highway earlier. Prigozhin appeared to have seized the headquarters of the Southern Military District in Rostov-on-Don. Wagner also claimed control of military installations in Voronezh, where a fuel depot caught fire following alleged sightings of a military helicopter. Clashes between Wagner and the Russian military were reported in the region. Later in the day, they reached Lipetsk Oblast, with some analysts pinpointing sightings near Yelets, 390 kilometres (240 miles) south of Moscow.

In Moscow, according to TASS, security was increased at key facilities. The Institute for the Study of War considered Prigozhin efforts as "unlikely to succeed" due to a lack of support from General Sergey Surovikin, the former overall commander of Russian forces in Ukraine, who called Putin "the popularly elected President of the Russian Federation".

In his first comments on the mutiny, President Vladimir Putin said "those who carry deliberately on a path of treason, preparing an armed rebellion when you were preparing terrorist attacks, will be punished," but did not directly mention Prigozhin.

Chechen leader Ramzan Kadyrov offered his forces to help "preserve Russia's units and defend its statehood", calling Prigozhin's actions "a knife in the back".

The FSB raided the headquarters of PMC Wagner in Saint Petersburg and reportedly seized cardboard boxes containing 4 billion rubles ($47 million) from vehicles near the office. Prigozhin said that the money was meant to pay employee salaries and other company expenses.

Later in the day, Prigozhin announced that his forces would stop their march on Moscow and withdraw to military camps following talks with Belarusian President Aleksandr Lukashenko, by which time Prigozhin claimed to have been just 200 kilometers (120 miles) away from Moscow. In exchange, Prigozhin was to be allowed to go into exile in Belarus and all charges against him and his followers were to be dropped. At around 11:00 p.m. (GMT+3), the Wagner Group began withdrawing their forces from Rostov-on-Don.

=== 25 June ===
Ukrainian forces claimed to have retaken the village of Rivnopil in Donetsk Oblast, as well as territories around Krasnohorivka near the city of Donetsk that had been held by pro-Russian separatists since 2014. Ukraine also claimed to have thwarted an attempt by Russian saboteurs to enter Sumy Oblast.

Shelling and air strikes by Russian forces were reported in Kherson, Sumy and Chernihiv oblasts.

Russian-installed officials in Zaporizhzhia Oblast said Russian troops killed two "two pro-Ukrainian terrorists" following overnight gunfire in Berdiansk. The Office of the Ukrainian Ombudsman later identified the dead as two teenagers who had been persecuted by the Russians on suspicions of plotting sabotage.

In Russia, Wagner forces started their withdrawal from Voronezh.

Germany announced it would supply Ukraine with 45 more Gepard self-propelled anti-aircraft guns by the end of the year, with 15 of them expected to arrive in the coming weeks.

=== 26 June ===
Three people were killed by Russian shelling in Kherson and in Nikopol.

A spokesman for the Ukrainian military claimed that Russian forces fired a "chemical aerosol munition with suffocating effect on one of the positions." The attack was said to have occurred in western Zaporizhzhia Oblast. Ukraine claimed that the wind blew the "aerosol munition" back to Russian positions.

President Zelenskyy visited the southern front. The Ukrainian Defence Ministry said that its forces had retaken 17 square kilometres (10.5 square miles) in Zaporizhzhia Oblast in the past week, while a total of 130 square kilometres (81 squares miles) of territory had been liberated since the start of the counteroffensive.

Wagner's Yevgeny Prigozhin released his first statement since the end of his rebellion against the Russian establishment, saying in an 11-minute audio message that he had acted to prevent the destruction of his military outfit and that he did not intend to topple the Russian government. On the same day, Defence Minister Sergei Shoigu made his first public appearance since the revolt, with video showing him visiting troops in Ukraine. In his first public statements since the revolt, President Putin continued to denounce Prigozhin's actions, while accusing Ukraine and the West of wanting to see civil conflict in Russia.

The Russian Ministry of Defence said that its Su-27 fighter jets intercepted an RC-135 electronic reconnaissance aircraft and two Typhoon fighter jets of Britain's Royal Air Force over the Black Sea.

Australian Prime Minister Anthony Albanese announced a AU$110 million ($73.5 million)-military package to Ukraine, which was to include 28 M113 armoured vehicles, 14 special operations vehicles, 28 medium trucks and 14 trailers as well as an additional supply of 105mm artillery ammunition. He also extended duty-free access for goods imported from Ukraine for a further 12 months to support its recovery and trade opportunities. An additional AU$10 million ($6.7 million) was also to be allocated for the United Nations-led Ukraine Humanitarian Fund. The Bulgarian government also approved a new military aid package to Ukraine.

=== 27 June ===
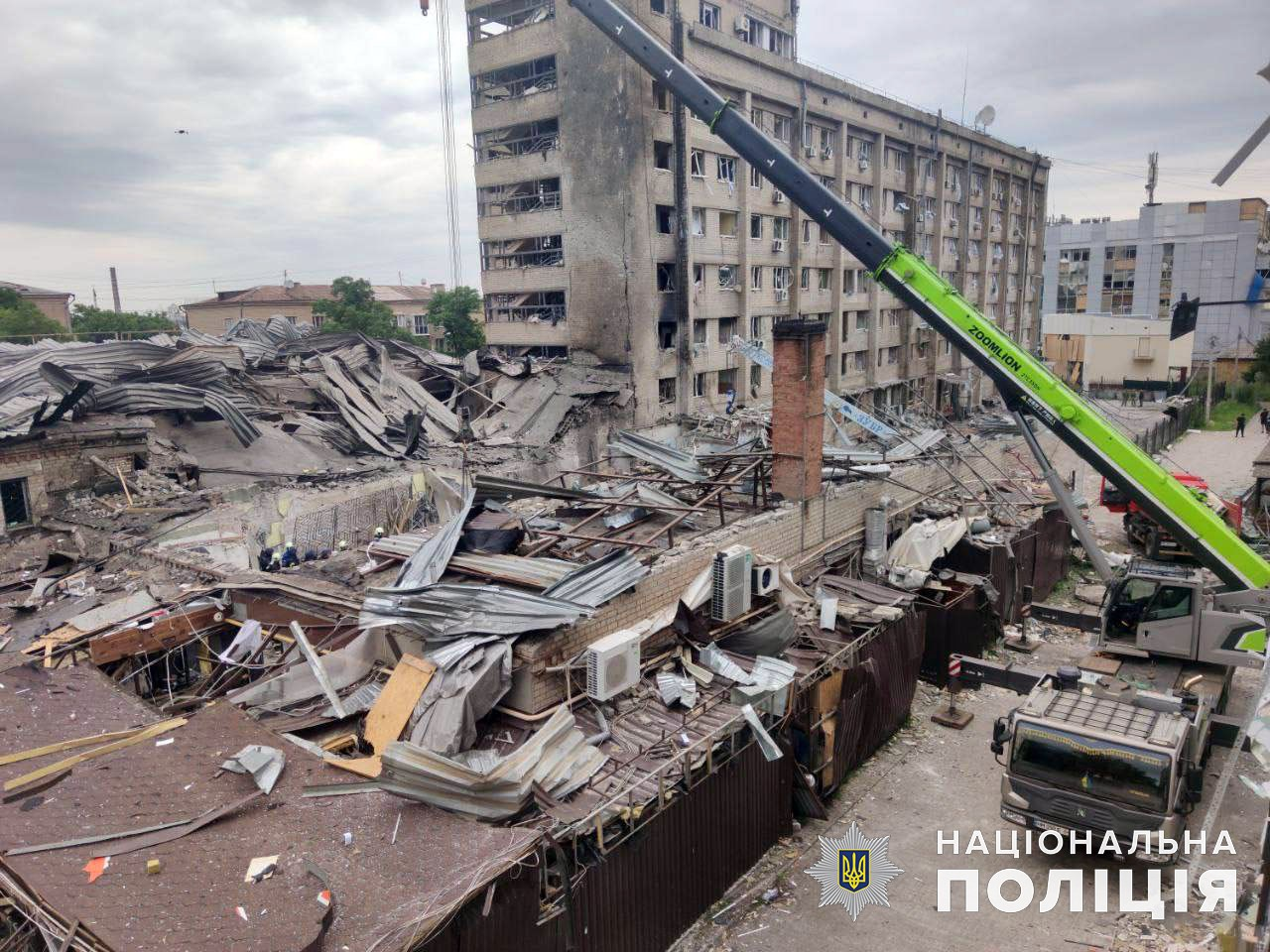
Restaurant in Kramatorsk after the strike

A Russian missile hit a restaurant in Kramatorsk, Donetsk Oblast, killing 13, including writer Victoria Amelina, and injuring 61 people. The attack, according to the Ukrainian Prosecutor-General, was carried out by an Iskander missile. Russian sources claimed that the site was used for "banqueting" by the Ukrainian military. At the time the restaurant had an estimated 80 people in it with more potentially trapped. A man was subsequently arrested by the SBU on suspicion of directing Russian fire at the restaurant while working for the GRU and charged with treason. In the nearby settlement of Bilenke, another missile strike injured 15.

Three people were killed by Russian shelling in Zaporizhzhia and Donetsk Oblasts. Missiles were also fired at Kremenchuk, coinciding with the first anniversary of the missile attack on a shopping mall in the city that killed 20 civilians.

In Belarus, President Lukashenko confirmed the arrival of the Wagner Group's Yevgeny Prigozhin in the country, saying that he was welcome to stay "for some time", while construction of camps for the group was reported to have begun in Mogilev Region. However, the State Border Guard Service of Ukraine stated there was no evidence that such camps were being built.

The Pentagon announced a $500-million military aid package for Ukraine that would include 30 Bradley infantry fighting vehicles, 25 Stryker armored vehicles, AT4 and Javelin anti-armor weapons, as well as Stinger anti-aircraft weapons. The package also included ammunition for Patriot air defense systems, HIMARS and Tube-Launched, Optically-Tracked, Wire-Guided (TOW) missiles, and 155mm and 105mm artillery rounds, as well as other types of munitions and support equipment.

Rheinmetall announced that it would supply Ukraine with 14 additional Leopard 2A4s on behalf of the Dutch government starting January 2024.

=== 28 June ===
Three people were killed by Russian shelling in Vovchansk, Kharkiv Oblast.

Six explosions were reported in Russian-occupied Melitopol. The Ukrainian military claimed to have shot down a Russian Su-25 fighter jet.

In Russia, the Moscow Times and a military blogger reported that General Sergei Surovikin was arrested and detained at Lefortovo Prison in Moscow for allegedly supporting the Wagner Rebellion. Meanwhile, President Putin visited Derbent, Dagestan, and celebrated Eid al-Adha at a mosque in his first non-official public appearance since the Wagner rebellion.

Lithuanian President Gitanas Nausėda announced that the country had acquired two launchers for the NASAMS air defense system and was planning to donate them to Ukraine, while his defense minister, Arvydas Anušauskas, also announced the delivery of 10 M113 armored vehicles and thousands of anti-tank munitions for grenade launchers. The country also introduced a temporary ban on land transport of 57 types of dual-use goods, mainly microelectronics and semiconductor components, that could reach Russia or Belarus and be used in the war against Ukraine.

Switzerland blocked the export of 96 Leopard 1 tanks to Germany, where they were to have been modernized and delivered to Ukraine, citing its longstanding policy of neutrality. However, it expanded its sanctions list on Russian entities to correspond with the latest sanctions announced by the EU.

The Hero of Ukraine award was given to Colonel Serhii Yaremenko, commander of the 96th Anti-Aircraft Missile Brigade, for shooting down 13 Kh-47M2 Kinzhal hypersonic missiles, according to the Ukrainian Air Force.

=== 29 June ===
Two people were killed by Russian shelling at a relief distribution center in Kherson. Another person was also killed by Russian shelling in nearby Bilozerka, while three others died in separate attacks across Zaporizhzhia Oblast.

Colonel-General Andrei Yudin, General Sergei Surovikin's deputy, was dismissed from the Russian army.

The World Bank approved the $1.5 billion-Ukraine Relief and Recovery Development Policy Loan, guaranteed by the Japanese government, to provide and fund relief to households, reforms to transparency over public resources, and support for markets in Ukraine.

=== 30 June ===
In Donetsk Oblast, two people were killed in a Russian attack on a school in Serhiivka, while one person was killed by shelling in Mykolaivka.

The Ukrainian military claimed to have struck a Russian headquarters and a fuel and lubricant warehouse in Berdiansk airport with 10 Storm Shadow missiles. At the time, the airport was being used by Russian helicopters defending against the Ukrainian counteroffensive. Russian forces claimed to have shot down at least one missile.

Ukrainian military intelligence reported a reduction in the number of Russian military personnel stationed at the Zaporizhzhia Nuclear Power Plant and in the nearby town of Enerhodar, as well as an advisory to employees to leave the facility before 5 July and blame Ukraine for any untoward incident at the plant.

Ukraine was accused of using banned anti-personnel landmines by Human Rights Watch, which documented the Ukrainian usage of rockets that spread PFM-1 and PFM-1S land mines despite Ukraine ratifying the Ottawa Treaty banning such weapons in 2005.

President Zelenskyy ordered the reinforcement of defenses along Ukraine's border with Belarus following the Wagner Group's redeployment there.

Denmark announced it would provide Ukraine with a DKK 1.3 billion ($190 million) military aid package that would include air defense missiles and funds for the purchase of artillery ammunition. In contrast, Hungary's Prime Minister Viktor Orban announced his opposition to a planned aid package of the European Union worth 50 billion euros ($55 billion) to Ukraine unless it accounts for the distribution of previous aid.

== July 2023 ==
=== 1 July ===
One person was killed by Russian shelling in Mala Tokmachka, Zaporizhzhia Oblast.

Ukraine announced sanctions on 189 Russian nationals, including Pavel Shatskikh, the director of Elektropribor, a leading aircraft enterprise, in Kazan. Sanctions were also imposed on nearly 300 companies linked to Russia's invasion of Ukraine, including its largest space industry company Energia. Two Belarusians, including Aleksei Shkadarevich, the director of LEMT Scientific and Technical Center in Minsk, and Georgian businessman Tamaz Gaiashvili, the founder of Georgian Airways, were also sanctioned, the latter for opening direct flights to Russia and offering transit flights to circumvent airspace bans by Western countries on Russian aircraft.

=== 2 July ===
Russia launched an overnight drone attack on Kyiv for the first time in 12 days, wounding one person. The Ukrainian military said it had shot down all drones. Two people were killed by Russian shelling in Donetsk Oblast.

Fighting broke out in Kherson Oblast, as the Institute for the Study of War assessed that 70 Ukrainian soldiers had landed under the Russian-controlled end of the Antonivskyi Bridge on the left bank of the Dnipro river, in the first incident of its kind since the alteration of the river's course in the area following the destruction of the Kakhovka Dam in June. Meanwhile, the Ukrainian Defence Ministry said its forces were advancing towards Berdyansk and Melitopol in the Zaporizhzhia front, but acknowledged Russian advances in Lyman, Avdiivka and Marinka in the Donetsk front. Russia also launched an offensive around Svatove, Luhansk Oblast, attacking the towns of Bilohorivka and Serebryanka.

The mayor of Enerhodar said that 100 employees of the Russian state nuclear firm Rosatom had left the Zaporizhzhia Nuclear Power Plant.

In Russia, a missile attack was reported at the Primorsko-Akhtarsk air base in Krasnodar Krai.

Organizers announced the cancellation of the biannual MAKS Air Show outside Moscow scheduled for later in July, that served as a showcase for Russian aerospace technology. British intelligence believed that the cancellation was due to fears of low attendance from international delegations and threats of Ukrainian drone attacks.

The Wagner Group suspended the operations of its physical recruitment centers for a month, while keeping its call centers open for applications. Poland announced it was sending 500 police and counterterrorist forces to reinforce its border with Belarus following the Wagner Group's redeployment there and to prevent migrants from illegally crossing the border.

=== 3 July ===
A drone attack on Sumy killed three people and injured nineteen. Two private properties and an government building were also damaged. The Ukrainian military claimed to have shot down thirteen out of seventeen Shahed drones launched at the country. Three others died in shelling across Sumy Oblast, while another was killed in Donetsk Oblast.

Ukrainian Deputy Defence Minister Hanna Maliar said that Ukrainian forces had recaptured 9 square kilometers of territory in the east and 28.4 square kilometers in the south during the previous week. She also claimed Ukrainian forces had sunk two Russian military vessels carrying 66 soldiers in Mykolaiv Oblast. In contrast, the Russian-installed governor of Kherson Oblast, Vladimir Saldo, claimed that Ukrainian forces had been dislodged from their bridgehead at the Antonivskyi Bridge, which was disputed by Western defense and intelligence analysts.

The IAEA announced that the Zaporizhzhia Nuclear Power Plant had been reconnected to its only available backup power line after a section of it on the opposite bank of the Dnipro River was damaged on 1 March.

The Russian news agency Interfax reported that the FSB foiled an assassination attempt on Sergey Aksyonov, the Russian-installed head of Crimea, adding that it had detained a Russian national who had reportedly been recruited by the SBU to kill Aksyonov using a car bomb.

Ukraine's National Agency on Corruption Prevention (NACP) placed Unilever to its list of sponsors of Russia's war on the country for continuing investments in Russia despite promises to pull out.

The International Center for the Prosecution of the Crime of Aggression against Ukraine, a body tasked with investigating Russian war crimes in the country, opened at the headquarters of the European Union's judicial cooperation agency, Eurojust, in The Hague, Netherlands.

Yevgeny Pisarenko, a commander of the Chechen Akhmat Unit, was reportedly killed in action in the Donbas.

=== 4 July ===
Two people were killed by Russian shelling in Kherson, while another was killed in Dalnie, Donetsk Oblast. At least 43 people, including 12 children, were injured in an attack on a residential area in Pervomaiskyi, Kharkiv Oblast, with a former commander of the Azov Brigade claiming that the attack targeted a military funeral.

In occupied Donetsk Oblast, Russia claimed one person was killed and 36 others were injured in a Ukrainian attack in Makiivka. The Ukrainian military said it had destroyed a Russian military formation there.

Russia claimed to have shot down four drones outside Moscow while jamming a fifth with electronic warfare, forcing it to crash into the Odintsovo district of Moscow Oblast, some 30 kilometers southwest of the capital. No casualties were reported. Flights from Vnukovo International Airport were temporarily suspended.

=== 5 July ===
One person was killed by Russian shelling in Bilozerka, Kherson Oblast.

Ukrainian officials accused the Russian military of having used the chemical weapon Lewisite at the front around Bakhmut.

Russian media claimed that a Ukrainian artillery strike caused a fire at an oil depot in Makiivka, Donetsk Oblast, citing the town's mayor.

Ukraine imposed sanctions on 18 holding companies linked to Russia and its war effort.

=== 6 July ===
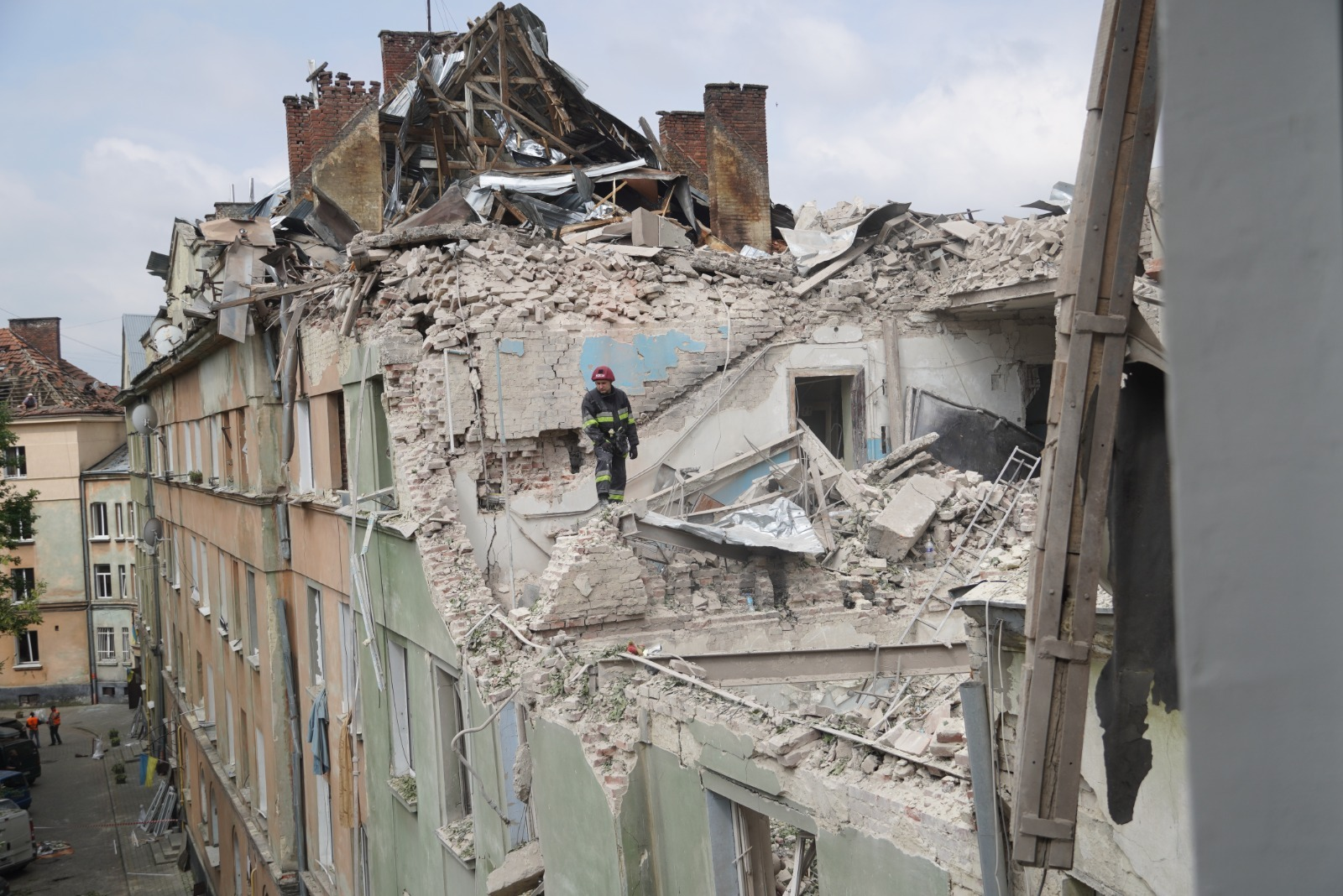
Destroyed residential building in Lviv

Ten people were killed and 42 others were injured in a Russian missile attack on an apartment in Lviv. 35 buildings and 50 cars were also damaged, while the Governor of Lviv Oblast also confirmed that a "critical infrastructure facility" was struck, while a house was damaged by missile debris in Zolochiv. The Ukrainian Culture Ministry said the attack led to damage in the buffer zone around the city's historic center, which was listed as a UNESCO World Heritage Site. The Mayor of Lviv called it the "largest attack on civilian infrastructure" in the city since the start of the invasion. The Ukrainian military said it had shot down seven out of ten Kalibr missiles launched at the city from the Black Sea. Two people were killed in separate attacks in Zaporizhzhia and Donetsk Oblasts respectively.

The Odnorobivka train station in Bohodukhiv Raion, Kharkiv Oblast, was destroyed by Russian shelling.

The Coordination Headquarters for the Treatment of Prisoners of War announced the return of 45 POWs and four civilian deportees, including two children, from Russia.

The High Anti-Corruption Court of Ukraine ordered the seizure of an An-140-100 aircraft belonging to the sanctioned Russian state defense conglomerate Rostec following a lawsuit by the Justice Ministry. The plane had been sent to the Antonov workshop in Ukraine for repairs at the time of the invasion in 2022 and was valued at Hr 150 million ($4 million).

Belarusian President Aleksandr Lukashenko said that Yevgeny Prigozhin had returned from Belarus to St. Petersburg and that his Wagner forces were still in their bases in Russia and occupied parts of Ukraine. However, he denied that it signaled the collapse of the deal he had reached to end the Wagner Group's rebellion.

The Finnish Defence Ministry announced a 105 million euros ($114 million) defence package to Ukraine that would include anti-aircraft weapons and ammunition.

The British Defence Ministry assessed that Russia was redeploying troops from as far as the Caucasus region and its border with China to reinforce its positions in Ukraine, while a Ukrainian military official said that Russia was looking to recruit 500,000 personnel to replenish its armed forces.

=== 7 July ===
Two people were killed in Dnipropetrovsk Oblast after their car was hit by debris during an overnight Russian drone attack. Another drone hit a business in Kryvyi Rih Raion, causing a fire but no casualties. The Ukrainian military said 18 Shahed drones were launched at targets in eastern and southern Ukraine, of which 12 were shot down. Later in the day, a Russian missile caused a fire at an infrastructure facility in Zaporizhzhia.

The Biden administration approved the deployment of DPICM cluster munitions to Ukraine fired from 155mm shells as part of its 42nd aid package to Ukraine as "a bridge of supplies" until US domestic production can catch up. This also included more M2 Bradley and Stryker armored vehicles along with ammunition for the HIMARS rocket system. The total package was estimated to be worth more than $800 million.

Czech Prime Minister Petr Fiala said that he would send additional attack helicopters and "hundreds of thousands" of rounds of large-caliber ammunition "in the coming months" to Ukraine following President Zelenskyy's visit to Prague.

Germany delivered a new military aid package to Ukraine which included Beaver bridge-laying vehicles, Dachs armored engineering vehicles, three radio jammers, two anti-drone sensors and jammers, six HX81 truck tractor trains, and three semi-trailers.

The IAEA said that it had not found evidence of explosives being planted inside the Zaporizhzhia Nuclear Power Plant in recent inspections as claimed by Ukraine. However, it demanded access to more areas of the facility, including the rooftops of the reactors, which had been closed off by Russian occupation authorities purportedly for security reasons.

=== 8 July ===
Nine people were killed and 12 others injured in a Russian rocket attack on residential areas of Lyman, Donetsk Oblast. Another person was killed in a separate attack in Avdiivka.

In Russia, the Governor of Belgorod Oblast claimed that missiles hit part of the central market of Shebekino.

After a visit to Turkey to secure President Recep Tayyip Erdoğan’s support for Ukraine's NATO membership, President Zelenskyy announced that he had secured the return of five commanders of the Ukrainian garrison at the Azovstal Metallurgical Plant who were taken prisoner after the Siege of Mariupol and were living in Turkey as part of an agreement with Russia. The Kremlin later complained that it was a violation of that said agreement and criticized Turkey for allowing it. He later visited Snake Island to commemorate the 500th day of the invasion.

=== 9 July ===
Two people were injured in separate Russian attacks in Kherson Oblast.

The Russian-installed head of Crimea claimed that a cruise missile was shot down near Kerch, while the Crimean Bridge was temporarily closed to traffic. The exiled mayor of Melitopol claimed an explosion occurred at a Russian military base near the city. Russian forces also claimed to have shot down three missiles over Bryansk and Rostov Oblasts, destroying a sawmill in the process.

The Wall Street Journal reported that Poland had recently sent Ukraine about a dozen Soviet-era Mi-24 attack helicopters in an undisclosed transfer, citing anonymous sources.

=== 10 July ===
Seven people were killed and 13 others were injured in a Russian bombing raid on a school hosting aid distribution operations in Orikhiv, Zaporizhzhia Oblast. Two people were killed in separate artillery attacks in Donetsk Oblast. A Russian S-300 missile struck Mykolaiv, no casualties were reported.

The General Staff of the Ukrainian Armed Forces claimed that it had retaken 10 square kilometers of territory in the southern front and 4 square kilometers in the eastern front over the past week. It also claimed to have advanced more than one kilometer towards Melitopol and Berdiansk. The Ukrainian Defence Ministry claimed its forces had recaptured key heights around Bakhmut and subjected all access points to the city under its line of fire.

In an interview with CNN, Rheinmetall CEO Armin Papperger announced that the firm would open an armored vehicle plant in western Ukraine within the next 12 weeks and hire and train Ukrainian staff to maintain its products.

Australia said it would deploy a Royal Australian Air Force E-7A Wedgetail surveillance aircraft to Germany along with up to as 100 crew and personnel to monitor vital humanitarian and military supply lines to Ukraine for the next six months. However, Prime Minister Anthony Albanese said that the aircraft would not conduct missions over Ukrainian, Belarusian and Russian airspace.

=== 11 July ===
Russia launched another drone strike overnight on Kyiv and Odesa. Ukrainian authorities reported no casualties and that 26 out of 28 drones launched were shot down. A woman was killed by shelling in Sofiivka, Kherson Oblast, while another was killed in Huliaipole, Zaporizhzhia Oblast.

A hotel used to house senior Russian military officials and the headquarters of the 58th Combined Arms Army was reportedly destroyed by a missile strike in Berdiansk. Among those reportedly killed was Lieutenant-General Oleg Tsokov, the deputy commander of the Russian Southern Military District, making him the highest ranking Russian officer killed during the invasion. Explosions reported at Novooleksiivka, Kherson Oblast, were believed to have come from a Russian ammunition dump.

Russian forces claimed to have advanced by 1.5 kilometers (0.9 miles) near Lyman.

In Russia, Navy Captain Stanislav Rzhitsky, deputy head of military mobilization efforts in Krasnodar, was shot and killed while jogging. As commander of the submarine Krasnodar based in the Black Sea, he was accused of having launched missiles that struck Vinnytsia in July 2022 and killed 23 civilians, although his father claimed he had left active service prior to the invasion in 2021.

==== NATO Summit ====
On the opening day of NATO's 2023 Vilnius summit, member states affirmed their support for Ukraine becoming part of the alliance, pending certain conditions, and confirmed that they had decided to drop the Membership Action Plan required for previous applicants in the case of Ukraine. However, NATO leaders offered no clear timetable or formal invitation as to when Ukraine could actually join.

President Emmanuel Macron said that France would supply MBDA-made SCALP missiles, its own version of the British Storm Shadow missile, on condition that its usage is limited to Ukrainian territory.

Ukrainian Defence Minister Oleksii Reznikov signed a memorandum that formally created a coalition of 11 states (Denmark, the Netherlands, Belgium, Canada, Luxembourg, Norway, Poland, Portugal, Romania, Sweden, and the United Kingdom) that had agreed to procure F-16 fighter jets for Ukraine and train Ukrainian pilots in their use, as well a deal with French Defence Minister Sebastien Lecornu that formalized a $187 million military aid agreement.

=== 12 July ===
Russia launched another overnight drone attack on Kyiv. The Ukrainian Air Force said it shot down 11 out of 15 drones launched. Two people were killed by Russian shelling in Kherson Oblast, while 21 people were injured in an airstrike on Zaporizhzhia.

The Russian Black Sea Fleet deployed a new camouflage scheme designed to hide its ships and their size from satellites to reduce the risk of detection and attack from Ukraine, which is only detectable through artificial intelligence.

Major General Ivan Popov, commander of the Russian 58th Combined Arms Army deployed in Zaporizhzhia Oblast, was removed from his post. In a Telegram message posted by a Russian MP, he claimed to have been fired by Defence Minister Sergei Shoigu after complaining about inadequacies in logistics that led to high casualties among his men and accusing his superiors of treason.

The Ukrainian General Staff claimed to have retaken 162 square kilometers (63 square miles) of territory since the start of its counteroffensive in June, while the Institute for the Study of War's (ISW) estimate was 253 square kilometers (98 square miles). The latter also estimated Russian gains since the start of the year at 282 square kilometers.

==== NATO Summit ====
On the closing day of the NATO Summit in Lithuania, President Zelenskyy announced that Ukraine would receive new Patriot systems and missiles from Germany and armored vehicles from Canada. However, he insisted on demanding a formal invitation to join NATO, which he called "ideal".

Australia pledged 30 more Bushmaster Protected Mobility Vehicles for Ukraine, while Norwegian Defence Minister Bjørn Arild Gram said it would send 1,000 Black Hornet drones and two NASAMS units. The United Kingdom also pledged a new military aid package that included more than 1,000 rounds for Challenger 2 tanks, more than 70 combat and logistics vehicles, and a $65 million contract for equipment maintenance, as well as the establishment of a military rehabilitation center. Germany also presented a $770 million aid package that included additional Patriot air defense units, while members of the G7 also agreed to provide long-term military and financial support to Ukraine.

Canadian Prime Minister Justin Trudeau announced an additional CA$541 million ($410 million) aid package to Ukraine, which included drone cameras. He also announced that Canada would host Ukrainian cadets at the Royal Military College Saint-Jean for training and expand that of Ukrainian soldiers in Latvia. Canada also pledged to provide Ukraine with an additional $37 million in its Comprehensive Assistance Package, including fuel, logistics equipment, and medical supplies, as well as $2 million for cyber security assistance.

Ukrainian Defence Minister Oleksii Reznikov confirmed that Ukrainian pilots would begin training on how to use F-16 fighter jets in Romania in August. He also signed two agreements with Sweden over defense procurements and the intelligence-sharing.

=== 13 July ===
One person was killed and four others were injured in a third consecutive overnight Russian drone attack on Kyiv. Attacks were also reported in Khmelnytskyi, Mykolaiv and Zaporizhzhia. The Ukrainian Air Force said it had intercepted all 20 Shahed drones launched, as well as two Kalibr cruise missiles. Four people were killed by Russian shelling in different parts of the country.

Brigadier General Oleksandr Tarnavskyi, the commander of the Ukrainian Tavriia military sector deployed in the southern front, told CNN that they had started receiving cluster munitions from the United States.

Spain pledged an aid package to the State Border Guard Service of Ukraine that would include personnel training in Spain and the donation of a mobile hospital and medical evacuation vehicles.

The US Department of Defense assessed that the Wagner Group was no longer participating significantly in military operations in Ukraine.

=== 14 July ===
Russia launched a series of drone attacks across southern Ukraine, with attacks reported in Dnipropetrovsk, Mykolaiv, Zaporizhzhia and Kherson Oblasts. One person was injured in Zaporizhzhia city, while another was injured in Kryvyi Rih.

Ukrainian forces claimed to have advanced 1.7 kilometers in the direction of Melitopol in the past week and destroyed nine Russian ammunition depots and 33 vehicles and heavy equipment in the southern front.

A South Korean presidential adviser said that the country would provide $52 billion to finance reconstruction projects in Ukraine, including in the rebuilding of water infrastructure affected by the destruction of the Kakhovka dam.

The Belarusian Defence Ministry said that the Wagner Group had begun training soldiers in the country and released a video showing Wagner fighters instructing Belarusian soldiers at a military range near Osipovichi, about 90 kilometers (56 miles) southeast of the capital Minsk. The State Border Guard Service of Ukraine later confirmed their arrival, saying that they did not believe they posed a serious threat to Ukraine but could be used to destabilize the situation along the border.

=== 15 July ===
One person was killed by Russian shelling in Kolodiazne, Kharkiv Oblast, while another person was killed in Kherson after a projectile which he was trying to disassemble in his garage exploded.

The Ukrainian military claimed to have destroyed the S-400 missile unit responsible for the Kramtorsk restaurant attack on 27 June with a HIMARS missile.

South Korean President Yoon Suk Yeol visited Kyiv. He also went to Bucha and Irpin and met with President Zelenskyy. He promised "de-mining equipment and ambulances" and announced that South Korea would join NATO's trust fund for Ukraine.

Major General Vladimir Seliverstov, commander of the Russian 106th Guards Airborne Division which saw action during the Battle of Bakhmut was reportedly removed from his position, with sources speculating that it could have been caused by him complaining about his soldiers' conditions.

=== 16 July ===
One person was killed by a Russian missile strike in Kharkiv, while another was killed in an airstrike in Zmiivka, Kherson Oblast.

Explosions were reported in cities across Russian-occupied Ukraine, including in Luhansk, Berdiansk and Mariupol. Officials in Sevastopol claimed ten drones were shot down over the city.

The Ukrainian military claimed to have advanced by more than one kilometer towards Berdiansk while acknowledging Russian advances in Kupiansk and in Lyman, subsequently assessing that Russia had deployed more than 100,000 personnel, more than 900 tanks, more than 555 artillery systems and 370 self-propelled guns in those areas.

In Russia, the FSB claimed to have discovered and thwarted an assassination plot by neo-Nazis working on behalf of Ukraine against Margarita Simonyan, chief editor of the state-controlled international news channel RT, and TV presenter Ksenia Sobchak. Seven people were subsequently arrested.

One person was reported to have been killed by Ukrainian shelling in Shebekino, Belgorod Oblast.

The last grain ship left Odesa under the extended Black Sea Grain Initiative set to expire on 17 July.

=== 17 July ===
Traffic was stopped on the Crimean bridge following reports of two explosions. The bridge partially collapsed along one span with rail services being stopped. Two occupants of a car were killed, while a third passenger was injured. Russia's Anti-Terrorist Committee claimed that Ukraine used unmanned surface drones to attack the bridge. Russian officials expected repairs to last until November. Nevertheless, the bridge reopened to traffic the next day, albeit with only one lane open. Ukraine formally admitted to launching the attack on 3 August.

Six people were killed in separate Russian attacks in Donetsk, Sumy and Zaporizhzhia Oblasts.

The Ukrainian Defence Ministry said it had retaken 18 square kilometers (7 square miles) of territory during its counteroffensive in the past week, raising the total amount of territory it retaken since June to 210 square kilometers (81 square miles).

On the last day of the Black Sea Grain Initiative, Russia said it was not being extended. Global wheat prices subsequently rose by as much as 8.5% in the succeeding days, while corn prices increased by 5.4%.

The United Kingdom imposed sanctions on 14 Russians over their involvement in the deportation of Ukrainian children to Russia and efforts to eradicate Ukrainian culture and identity. Among those sanctioned were Ksenia Mishonova, Commissioner for Children's Rights in Moscow Oblast, Education Minister Sergey Kravtsov, RT presenter Anton Krasovsky, who publicly called for the murder of Ukrainian children, and Culture Minister Olga Lyubimova. The SBU later imposed additional charges against Krasovsky, who had already been sentenced in absentia by Ukraine to five years imprisonment, for incitement to genocide.

=== 18 July ===
Russia launched a wave of airstrikes on southern Ukraine using drones and missiles. One attack led to a fire in the port of Mykolaiv, while another attack on Odesa injured one person. The Ukrainian Air Force claimed to have shot down 32 out of 37 drones and all 6 missiles launched, most of which were intercepted over Odesa Oblast. The Kremlin said the attacks were in retaliation for the Crimean Bridge attack on 17 July.

One person was killed by Russian shelling in Dvorichna, Kharkiv Oblast.

Russia claimed to have shot down 28 drones over Crimea. It also claimed that its forces advanced 2 kilometers (1.2 miles) towards Kupiansk, which was denied by Ukrainian Colonel-General Oleksandr Syrskyi.

The defence ministers of the Low Countries pledged to provide Ukraine with refurbished M113 armored vehicles.

=== 19 July ===
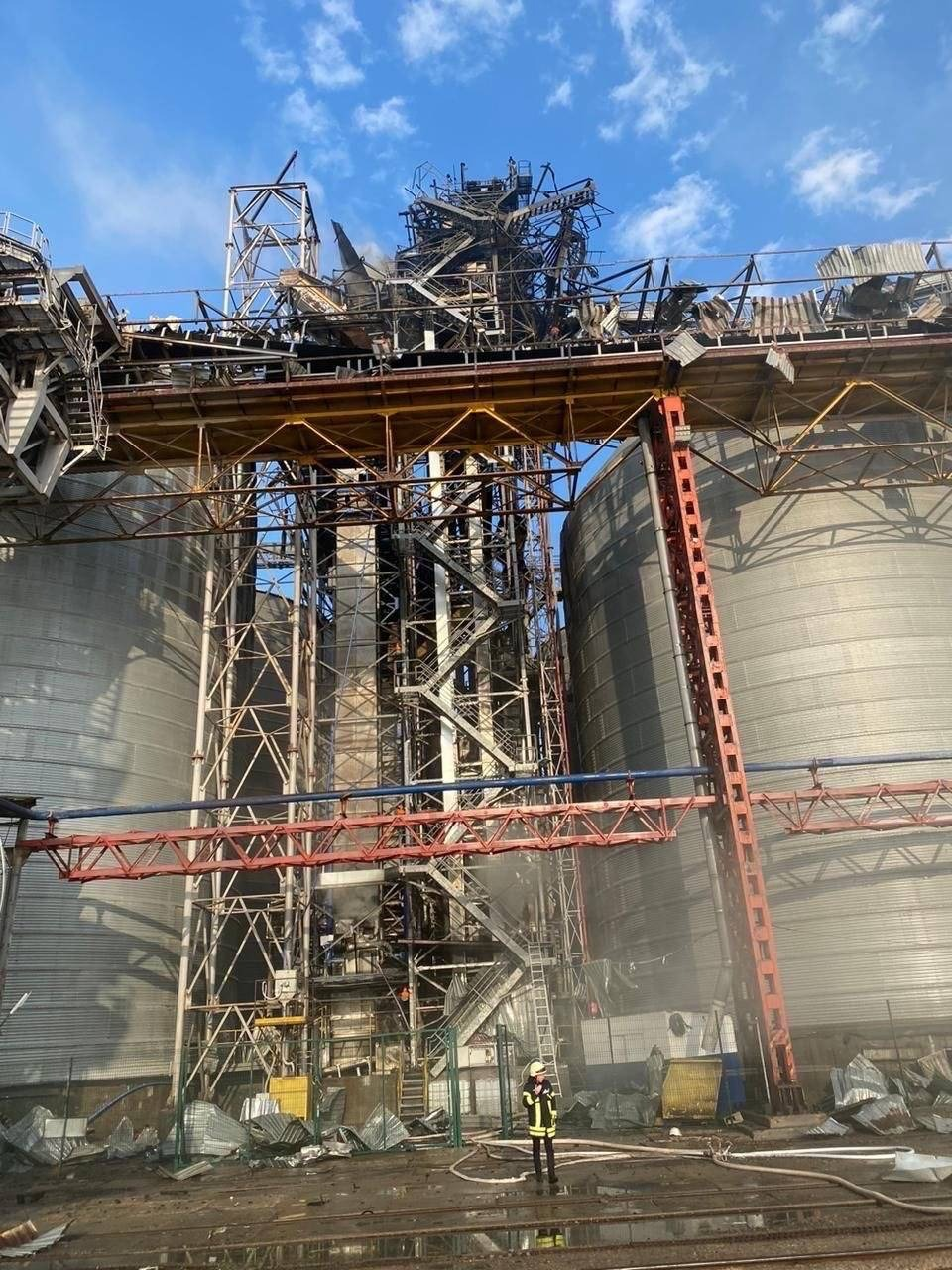
Damaged port infrastructure in Odesa region

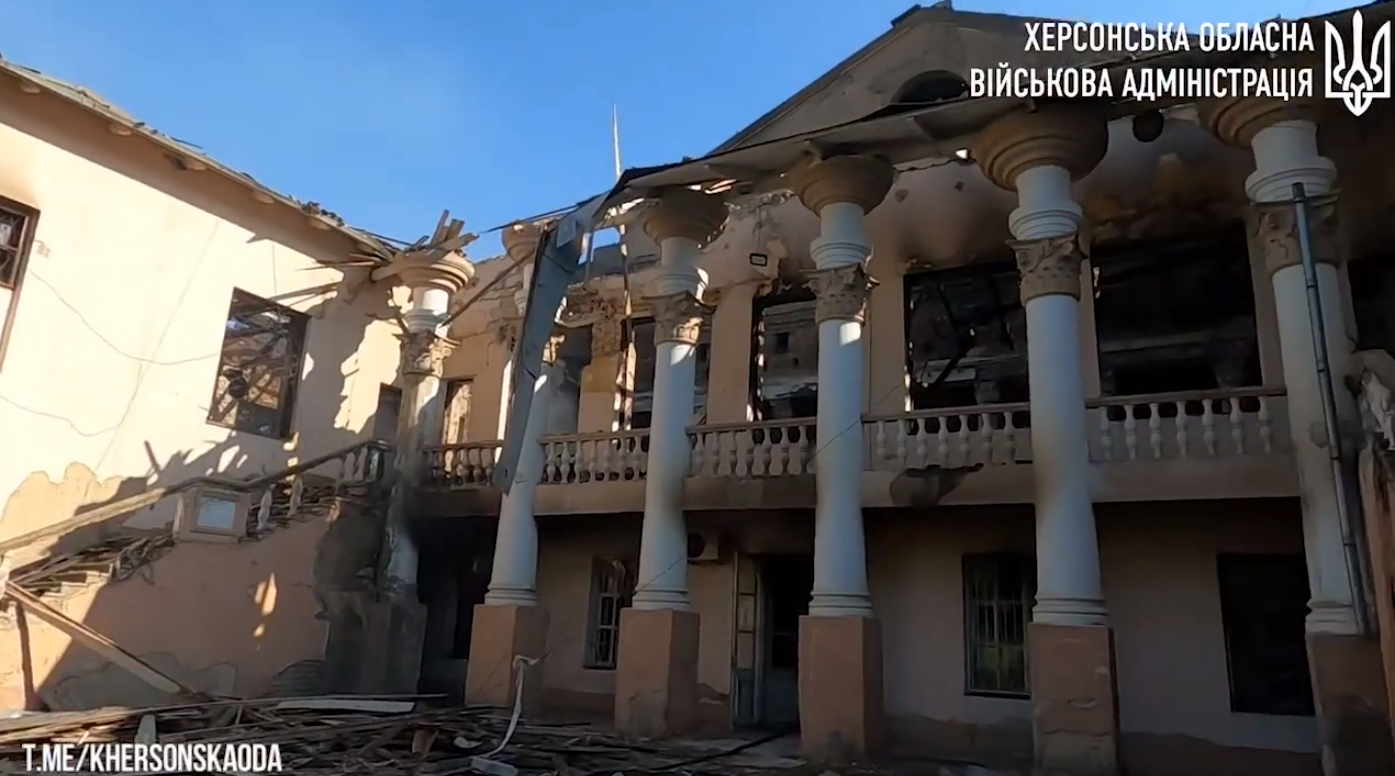
Destroyed palace of culture in Kherson

Russia launched another wave of airstrikes on Odesa, where an apartment and a building of the Chinese consulate was reportedly damaged, as well as on Kyiv using drones and missiles. One person was killed and 12 people were wounded in Odesa, while the Ukrainian Air Force claimed to have shot down 14 missiles and 23 drones. President Zelenskyy and other officials said the strikes in Odesa targeted infrastructure for exporting grain. The Ukrainian Agriculture Ministry said 60,000 tons of grain were destroyed by airstrikes in the port of Chornomorsk, Odesa Oblast.

Four people were killed in separate Russian attacks in Donetsk, Kharkiv, Mykolaiv, and Zaporizhzhia Oblasts.

The Ukrainian military claimed to have pushed out Russian forces from their positions near the village of Orikhovo-Vasylivka, northwest of Bakhmut.

In Crimea, explosions were heard in Sevastopol, while explosions at the Krynychky military training ground near Staryi Krym in Kirovske Raion forced the closure of the nearby Tavrida Highway. More than 2,000 residents of four villages near the site were evacuated, and unconfirmed reports said that the blasts were caused by three Ukrainian airstrikes.

The Russian Defence Ministry announced that it would attack cargo ships servicing Ukrainian ports starting on 20 July. In response, the Ukrainian Defence Ministry threatened to attack cargo ships servicing Russian and occupied ports in the Black Sea. The Russian Foreign Ministry later clarified that all ships sailing in the Black Sea were to be inspected for military cargo.

In an interview made in occupied Lysychansk, Luhansk Oblast aired on state TV channel Belarus-1, the head of the Belarus Red Cross, Dzmitry Shautsou, wearing military clothes with the Z symbol, openly admitted to the abduction and deportation of Ukrainian children from Russian-occupied areas to Belarus for "health improvement" reasons, saying that it would continue to do so. The International Federation of Red Cross and Red Crescent Societies dissociated itself from his statements, while expressing "grave concern" and demanding a halt to the practice. It also triggered an investigation by the body's investigative committee.

In his first public appearance since the end of the Wagner Rebellion, Yevgeny Prigozhin said his forces would no longer fight in Ukraine and focus on training soldiers in Belarus and maintaining its activities in Africa instead.

The South African Presidency confirmed that Vladimir Putin had agreed not to attend the BRICS Summit to be held in Johannesburg in August and would instead be represented by Foreign Minister Sergei Lavrov. President Cyril Ramaphosa had previously warned that any attempt to arrest Putin while he was in the country based on the warrants issued by the International Criminal Court would be equivalent to a "declaration of war." The South African Department of Justice and Constitutional Development later issued a warrant for Putin's arrest on 21 July.

The United States announced a new $1.3 billion military aid package to Ukraine that would include 4 NASAMS systems, Phoenix Ghost and Switchblade Unmanned Aerial Systems (UAS), precision aerial munitions, 152mm artillery rounds, mine clearing equipment, electronic warfare and drone detection equipment, and port security equipment, 165 tactical vehicles and 150 fuel trucks.

During a visit to Odesa shortly after the airstrikes, USAID chief Samantha Power pledged $250 million to support Ukraine's agriculture sector through the Agriculture Resilience Initiative-Ukraine (AGRI-Ukraine), while Taoiseach Leo Varadkar pledged 5 million euros ($5.6 million) in humanitarian aid through the UN Humanitarian Fund and the Red Cross during his state visit to Kyiv and Bucha.

=== 20 July ===
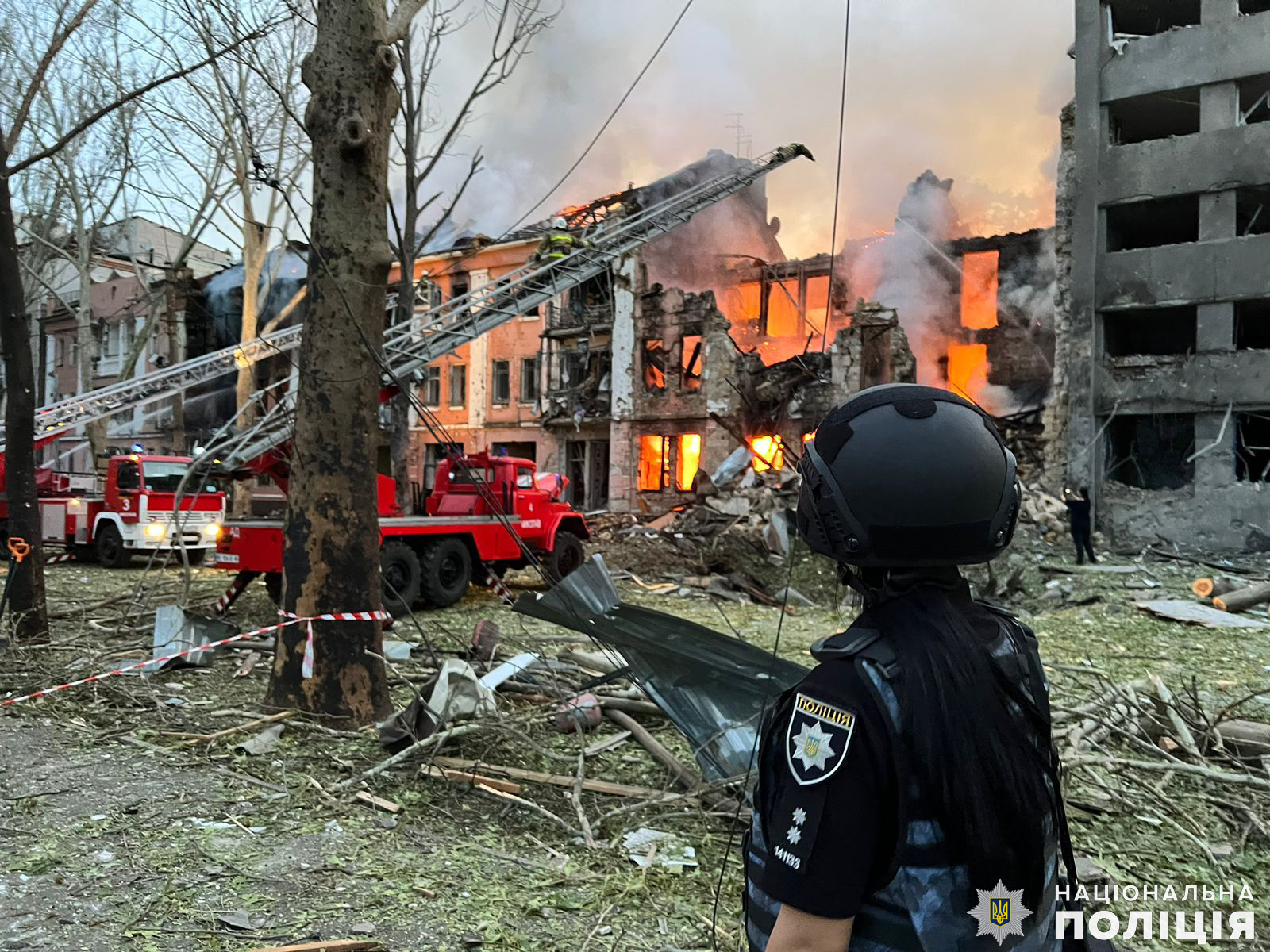
Destroyed buildings in Mykolaiv

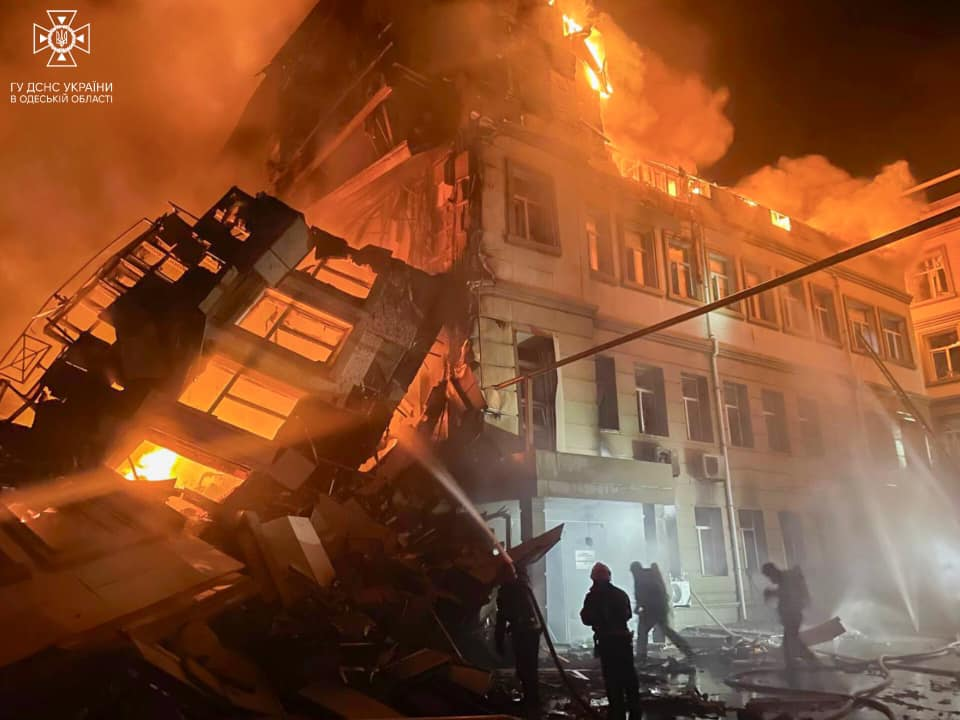
Destroyed building in Odesa

Russia launched another wave of airstrikes on Odesa and Mykolaiv. 18 people were injured and 2 killed in Mykolaiv after an apartment was struck, while two others were injured in Odesa. The Ukrainian Air Force claimed to have shot down five out of 19 missiles launched.

Seven people were killed in separate Russian attacks in Donetsk, Kharkiv and Zaporizhzhia Oblasts.

One person was reportedly killed in a drone attack in northwestern Crimea, while pro-Ukrainian officials claimed that the "Ukrainian House" cultural center in Mariupol was set on fire by unidentified individuals using explosives.

The Ukrainian military claimed to have "semi-encircled" Russian forces in Bakhmut. Officers told the Washington Post that it had used US-made cluster munitions for the first time against Russian trenches in the southeastern front. US officials later confirmed this, saying that the munitions have been used "effectively".

The SBU arrested an employee of Ukrainian Railways in Dnipro for passing security and military information to Russia in preparation for attacks on transport infrastructure.

Australia announced sanctions against 35 firms supplying advanced technology and equipment to the Russian military and firms involved in nuclear energy and Arctic resource extraction. This included JSC Russian Helicopters and JSC Concern Kalashnikov. 10 individuals were also sanctioned, including the respective CEOs of the aforementioned firms Nikolai Kolesov and Vladimir Lepin, as well as Russian First Deputy Prime Minister Andrey Belousov, Deputy Prime Minister Dmitry Chernyshenko, and senior Belarusian officials "who have threatened Ukraine's sovereignty and territorial integrity.

The US announced more sanctions on individuals and firms linked to the Russian war effort in Ukraine. Among those sanctioned were Alexei Kudrin, a close ally of Putin and corporate development advisor for the technology firm Yandex, and Russian national Valery Chekalov and North Korean citizen Yong Hyuk Rim, both of whom supplied the Wagner group with ammunition. Five Russian banks and several companies based in Kyrgyzstan were also sanctioned, the latter for supplying Russia with dual-use technology to bypass sanctions.

In an interview with Fox News, US National Security Council Coordinator for Strategic Communications John Kirby said that Ukraine would receive F-16 fighter jets by the end of 2023.

Germany formally turned over the first 10 Leopard 1A5 tanks it had previously pledged to Ukraine, as well as 20 MG3 machine guns for armored vehicles, over 1,000 155mm artillery rounds, more than 2,000 155mm smoke ammunition, one new bridge system, 12 accompanying trailers, four border protection vehicles, 10 ground surveillance radars, 16 Zetros trucks, 100,000 first aid kits, and 80 reconnaissance drones.

Ukrainian Culture Minister Oleksandr Tkachenko resigned after President Zelenskyy criticized the ministry's overspending in spite of the ongoing conflict.

=== 21 July ===
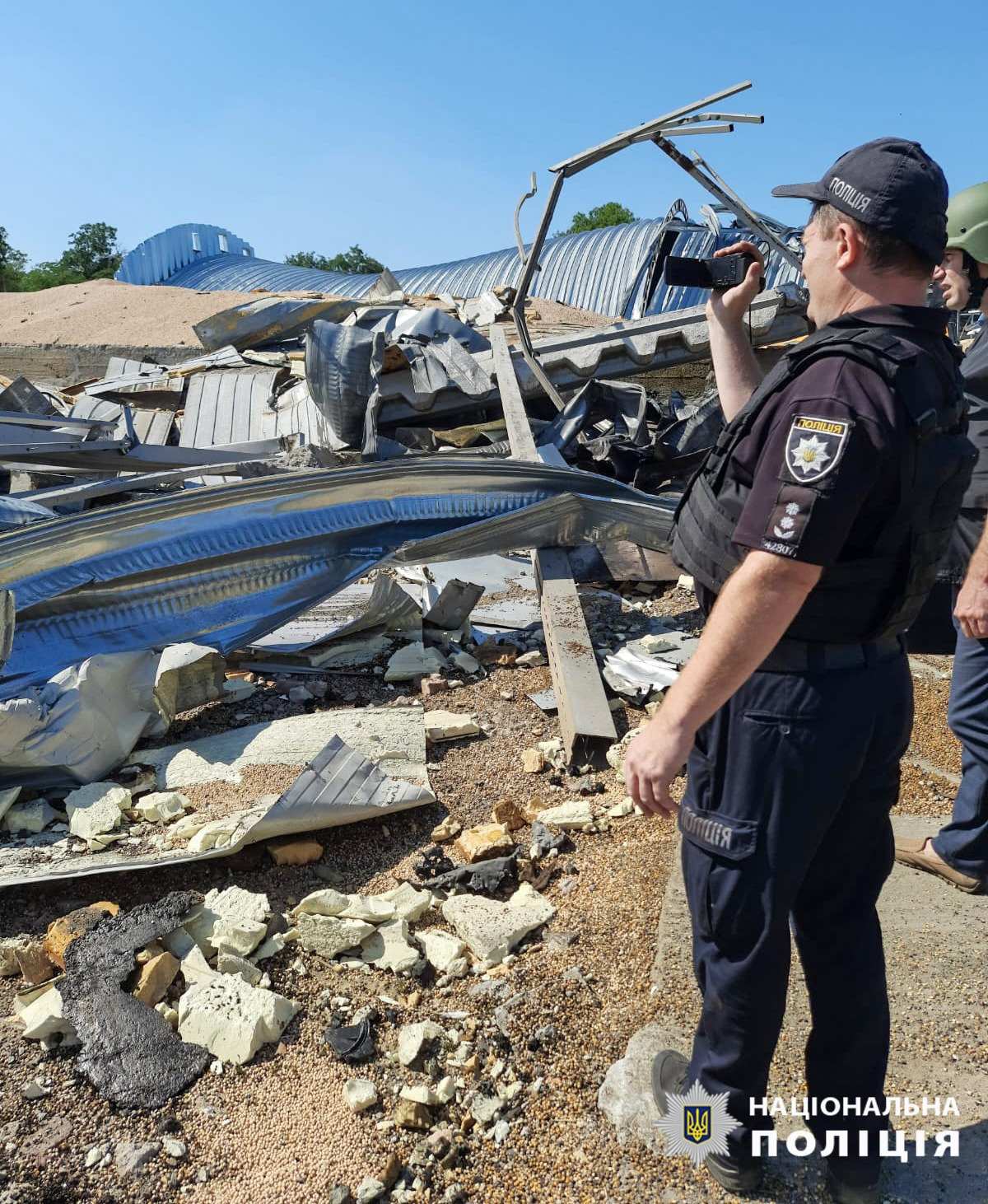
Destroyed granary in Odesa Oblast, 21 July

Russia launched two separate missile attacks on Odesa. The first attack occurred overnight at a grain terminal, with Ukrainian authorities claiming two people were injured and that 100 tonnes of peas and 20 tonnes of barley had been destroyed. A second attack occurred in the morning.

Eight people, including two children were killed in separate Russian attacks in Chernihiv, Zaporizhzhia and Donetsk Oblasts. The Ukrainian military claimed to have thwarted attacks by Russian sabotage groups in Sumy and Chernihiv Oblasts.

Ukraine's state nuclear company Energoatom accused the Yuri Chernichuk, the Russian-installed general director of the Zaporizhzhia Nuclear Power Plant of pressuring Ukrainian plant workers who have refused to sign contracts with Russia's state nuclear operator to activate reactor number 4 due a lack of skilled Russian specialists.

Vadym Prystaiko, Ukraine's ambassador to the United Kingdom, was sacked following a decree from President Zelenskyy. No reason was given. He was also dismissed from his role as the Ukrainian representative to the International Maritime Organization. In the past week, Prystaiko had criticized Zelenskyy's comments regarding Ukraine's alleged lack of gratitude to the UK for military aid.

Russian nationalist Igor Girkin, who commanded separatist fighters during the War in Donbas and was convicted in absentia by a Dutch court for the MH-17 shootdown in 2015, was detained by the FSB according to his wife Miroslava, on charges of extremism. He had been an open critic of Putin and his generals’ handling of the war in Ukraine, and called for his overthrow earlier in the week. The RBC newspaper reported that his arrest was possibly related to a petition from a member of the Wagner Group.

The Ukrainian government formally moved to nationalize Sense Bank, whose owner, Ukrainian-born Russian oligarch Mikhail Fridman, was previously sanctioned for financially and logistically supporting the invasion of Ukraine.

The Bulgarian Parliament approved the transfer of around 100 Soviet-era armored personnel carriers to Ukraine.

=== 22 July ===
A drone attack on an ammunition dump in Krasnohvardiiske Raion, Crimea led to evacuations within a five-kilometer radius. Traffic on the Crimean Bridge was also briefly suspended.

Seven people were killed by Russian shelling in Donetsk, Sumy and Kharkiv Oblasts.

Four Russian journalists were wounded on the Zaporizhzhia front near Piatykhatky by Ukrainian shelling according to the Russian MoD. One of them, Rostislav Zhuravlev of RIA Novosti, later died of his wounds while being evacuated. Russia claimed cluster munitions were used without providing evidence. Meanwhile, a camera operator for Deutsche Welle was injured after an apparent Russian cluster bombing of Ukrainian positions near Druzhkivka, Donetsk Oblast, also killing one Ukrainian soldier.

An explosion was reported at the residence of Heorhii Zhuravko, the Russian-installed mayor of Oleshky, Kherson Oblast.

Yehor Cherniev, deputy chair of the Verkhovna Rada's defense committee and head of Ukraine's parliamentary delegation to NATO, announced that the country had developed its own medium-range air defense systems that were similar to the Hawk defense system, describing the results of initial tests as "quite successful."

The Ukrainian Economy Ministry said Sweden pledged 522.6 million euros ($581 million) for Ukraine's recovery, with the funds being directed toward the Cooperation Strategy for Reconstruction and Reforms in Ukraine between 2023-2027 and focused on infrastructure reconstruction, green development, entrepreneurship, trade, demining, and media initiatives.

=== 23 July ===
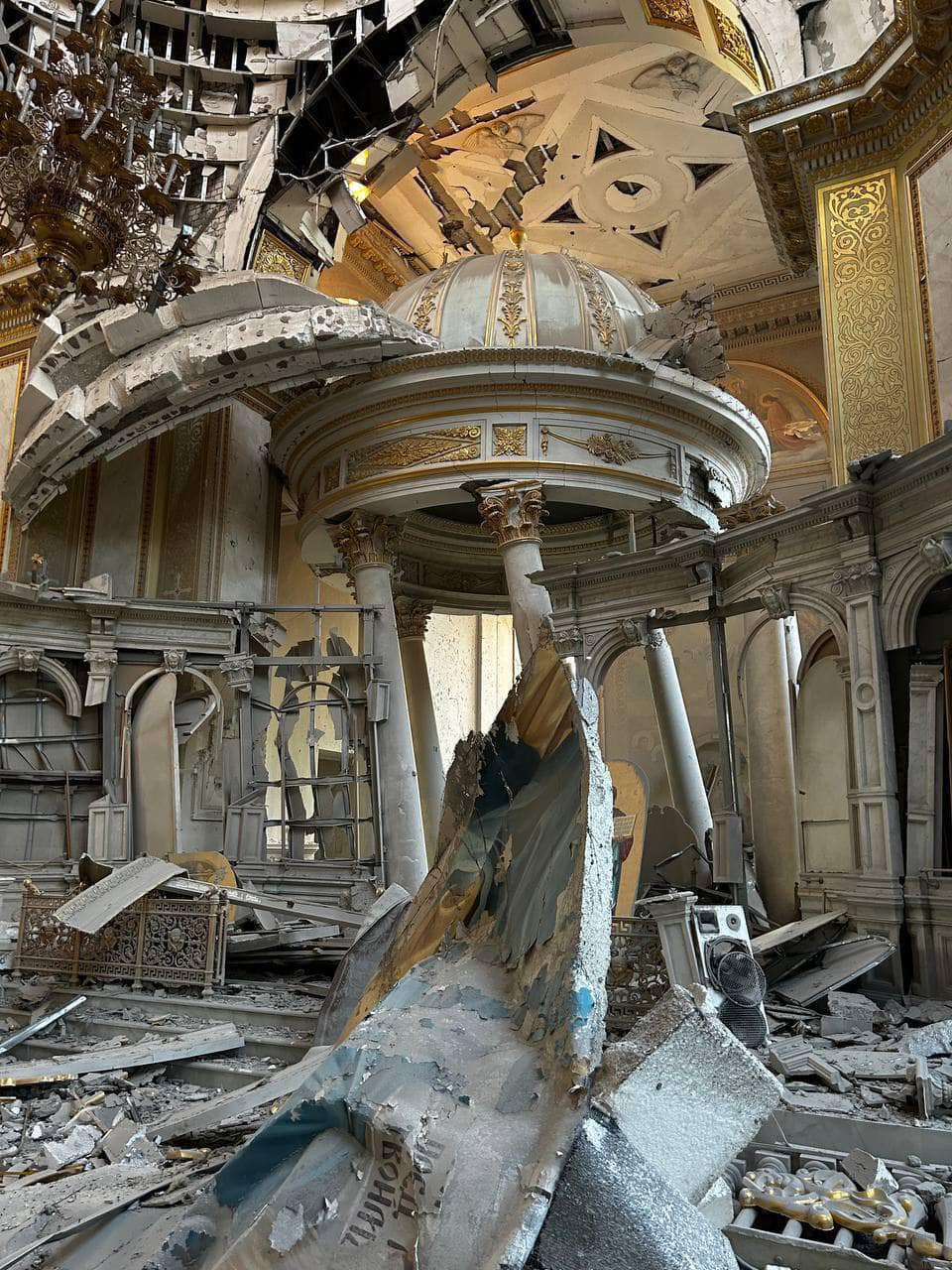
Transfiguration Cathedral in Odesa after a missile strike on 23 July

Russia launched another overnight missile attack on Odesa, killing two people and injuring 19 others. The Orthodox Transfiguration Cathedral, the city's largest, was severely damaged. Russia claimed to have struck naval drone production facilities but denied targeting the cathedral. Altogether, 25 architectural monuments were damaged in the historic Centre of Odesa according to local authorities. The Ukrainian Air Force claimed to have shot down nine out of 19 missiles launched at the city.

An aid distribution point housed in a cultural center in Chasiv Yar, Donetsk Oblast, was reportedly destroyed by Russian cluster bombing. No casualties were reported.

Six housing facilities and a power line were damaged by Russian shelling in Nikopol.

United States Secretary of State Antony Blinken claimed that Ukraine had recaptured about 50% of territory seized by Russian forces.

Yehor Chernev, member of the Verkhovna Rada and Deputy Chairman of the National Security, Defense and Intelligence Committee, announced a new Ukrainian air defence system was being tested. Called the SD-300, it was described as a medium range system with a limit of 100 kilometers.

=== 24 July ===
A drone attack hit two unoccupied buildings, including a high-rise business center, in Moscow, forcing the closure of several thoroughfares in the city center. Two drones were involved and were "suppressed" before crashing. There were no reports of serious casualties or "serious" damage. The attack occurred about two kilometers from the Russian Defense Ministry.

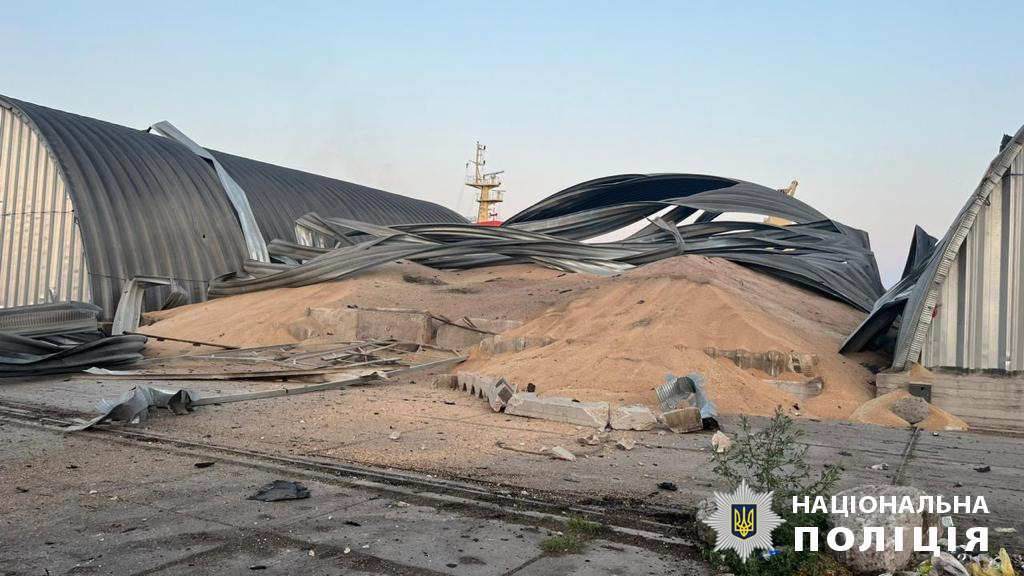
Granary in the Port of Reni after a strike

Russia launched drone strikes on the Danube River port of Reni in Odesa Oblast, along the border with Romania. Authorities said four people were injured, while a grain hangar, storage tanks and three warehouses were bombed. Three out of about 15 drones launched were reportedly shot down. Three people, including two children, were killed by Russian cluster bombing in Kostiantynivka, Donetsk Oblast.

Officials in Crimea said a Ukrainian drone caused an explosion at an ammunition depot in Dzhankoi, leading to evacuations within a five-kilometer radius, while another drone damaged a home in Kirovske raion. 11 drones were reportedly shot down, while rail services in Dzhankoi Raion and the Dzhankoi-Simferopol highway were closed.

The Ukrainian military claimed to have retaken 12.7 square kilometers of territory in the southern front and 4 square kilometers in the eastern front, increasing the total amount of territory retaken since the start of the counteroffensive to 192.1 square kilometers. It also claimed to have advanced by up to 1.4 kilometers towards Berdiansk.

=== 25 July ===
Russia launched another overnight drone attack on Kyiv. Authorities reported that all drones launched had been shot down. Attacks were also reported in Zhytomyr and Kharkiv Oblasts.

Four people were killed by Russian shelling in Donetsk and Kherson Oblasts.

The Ukrainian military claimed to have retaken the village of Andriivka, south of Bakhmut, and pushed out Russian forces from Staromaiorske in southern Donetsk Oblast. It also confirmed the use of US-supplied cluster munitions in Bakhmut. Meanwhile, Russia claimed it had taken the village of Serhiivka, near Lyman.

Trevor Reed, former US Marine who was released from Russian custody in 2019, was injured while fighting for Ukraine and was transferred to Germany for treatment. The US government denied involvement in his actions.

The SBU announced treason charges against pro-Russian politician and leader of the banned political party Nashi, Yevhen Murayev, who had left Ukraine in May 2022 and was said to be one of Russia's choices to head a puppet administration in the country.

Russia claimed it had thwarted an attack by two naval drones on its patrol ship Sergei Kotov in the Black Sea.

The Russian State Duma passed a law that raised the maximum age of conscription from 27 years to 30.

An IAEA inspection of the Zaporizhzhia Nuclear Power Plant found anti-personnel mines in a buffer zone between the site's internal and external perimeter barriers that was accessible only to the Russian military.

The United States pledged another military aid package to Ukraine worth $400 million, which included ammunition for air defense, rocket and artillery systems, while Ukrainian Economy Minister Yulia Svyrydenko said foreign governments and NGOs pledged $244 million in funds and equipment for de-mining efforts in the country. Norway also donated $24 million to the European Peace Facility (EPF) program of the European Union, despite not being a member of it, to use in obtaining ammunition and spare parts for Leopard 2 tanks.

=== 26 July ===
Russia launched a missile attack on Starokostiantyniv, Khmelnytskyi Oblast. The Ukrainian Air Force claimed to have shot down 36 missiles.

The New York Times reported that the Ukrainian military was to begin deploying Western-trained soldiers that had been held in reserve for its counteroffensive in the Zaporizhzhia front.

Ukrainian Prime Minister Denis Shmyhal announced that the government was allocating ₴40 billion ($1.08 billion) to develop the domestic drone industry.

Pro-Russian politician Vadym Rabinovych, former co-chair of the banned political party Opposition Platform – For Life who fled Ukraine after blaming it and the West for Russia's invasion, was charged with treason by the Ukrainian State Bureau of Investigation.

President Zelenskyy signed a law introducing a state register of sanctions.

U.S. National Security Council spokesman John Kirby said that Ukrainian pilots were to receive training on F-16 fighter jets in Denmark and Romania, while U.K. was providing English-language lessons to the pilots.

People's Deputy of Ukraine Yuriy Aristov, from President Zelenskyy's Servant of the People party, was charged with going on holiday in the Maldives using false pretenses despite the wartime ban on officials holidaying abroad. He later submitted his resignation to the Verkhovna Rada.

The International Olympic Committee formally excluded Russia and Belarus from the 2024 Olympic Games in Paris as part of its continuing response to the invasion of Ukraine. Ukrainian Sports Minister Vadym Gutzeit announced that the country would end its boycott of sporting events that included Russian and Belarusian athletes as long as they compete as neutrals.

The United States said that it would assist in the International Criminal Court's investigation of Russian war crimes in Ukraine, after reversing its previous stance citing fears of prosecution against US and allied parties.

=== 27 July ===
Western and Ukrainian officials and analysts said that the Ukrainian military had launched a renewed drive in the Zaporizhzhia front, particularly in the direction of Melitopol. The Institute for the Study of War, also citing Russian sources, reported that Ukrainian forces launched "a significant mechanized counteroffensive operation" in the west of the oblast, adding that they appeared "to have broken through certain pre-prepared [sic] Russian defensive positions," which was denied by pro-Russian officials. At the same time, Russian authorities closed off access to the Arabat Spit linking Crimea with mainland Ukraine.

The Ukrainian military claimed to have retaken the village of Staromaiorske in southern Donetsk Oblast after previously driving out Russian forces there.

Pro-Russian officials in Zaporizhzhia Oblast claimed that one person was injured by a Ukrainian rocket attack in Tokmak.

Russia launched another overnight missile strike on a port in Odesa Oblast, killing a civilian guard. One person was killed in an airstrike on a residential building in Kivsharivka, Kharkiv Oblast.

Japan imposed additional sanctions on Russia over the invasion, banning the export of vehicles fitted with 1,900 cc engines or greater, as well as vehicles with hybrid and electric motors to the country.

=== 28 July ===
Russia launched an evening missile attack at Dnipro, striking a building of the SBU and a residential building. Ten people were injured.

The headquarters of the Interior Ministry of the Donetsk People's Republic in Donetsk city was reportedly damaged by a Ukrainian airstrike, while Ukraine claimed that saboteurs blew up an ammunition warehouse at Kozacha Bay, the headquarters of the Russian 810th Guards Naval Infantry Brigade, in Crimea.

Ukraine's state nuclear energy firm Energoatom accused Russia of detaining and torturing Zaporizhzhia Nuclear Power Plant engineer Serhii Potynh since June.

In Russia, a missile strike was reported near a café in Taganrog, Rostov Oblast, 40 kilometers from the internationally recognized Ukrainian border. Another missile was intercepted near Azov later in the day. 14 people were injured. An explosive was also reported to have been detonated at the Kuibyshev oil refinery in Samara Oblast. No injuries or serious damage was reported. A drone was also reported to have been shot down in Moscow Oblast.

President Zelenskyy signed a law moving the official celebration of Christmas in Ukraine from 7 January to 25 December, saying it was part of efforts to "renounce Russian heritage."

The Ukrainian Prosecutor-General filed criminal charges against Serhii Yevsiukov, the head of the Olenivka prison in Russian-occupied Donetsk Oblast, and his deputy Kyrylo Shakurov, for violating international humanitarian law through the inhumane treatment, abuse and torture of at least 100 Ukrainian prisoners of war.

=== 29 July ===
Two people were killed in a Russian missile attack in Zaporizhzhia. Two others were killed in an attack on an educational institution in Sumy.

Pro-Russian officials in Kherson Oblast said Ukraine launched missile attacks on the railway between Henichesk and Dzhankoi, Crimea. The Ukrainian military later confirmed that it had struck the Chonhar bridge.

Ukraine was reported to have been using Grad rockets manufactured by North Korea that were supplied to the country after being seized by a "friendly" state.

President Zelenskyy met with Ukrainian special forces soldiers in Chasiv Yar, Donetsk Oblast, on the occasion of the Day of the Special Operations Forces in Ukraine.

=== 30 July ===
A Ukrainian drone attack on Moscow damaged two office buildings and led to an hour-long suspension of operations at Vnukovo International Airport. The Russian military claimed to have intercepted three drones, two of which hit the buildings. One person was injured. Russian forces also claimed Ukraine launched a drone attack on Crimea overnight, saying that 25 drones had been intercepted.

Two people were killed by Russian shelling in Donetsk and Kharkiv Oblasts, while a building was damaged by a missile in Kharkiv city.

At least six civilian vessels were reported to have broken through the Russian naval blockade in the Black Sea towards Ukraine, subsequently arriving at the mouth of the Danube river, near the Romanian border.

=== 31 July ===
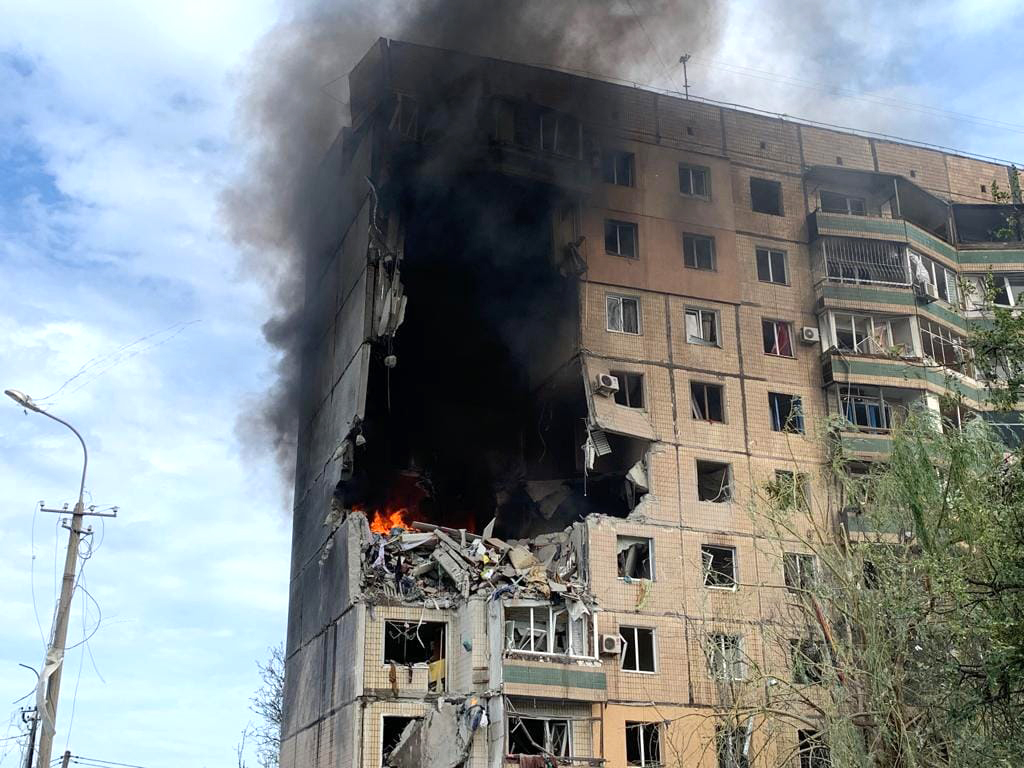
Residential building in Kryvyi Rih after an attack

At least six people, including a child, were killed and 75 others were injured in a Russian missile attack on Kryvyi Rih. Six others were killed separate attacks in Kherson and Donetsk Oblasts.

Ukrainian Deputy Defence Minister Hanna Maliar claimed that Ukrainian forces recaptured 15 square kilometres of territory during the last week, putting the total amount of territory retaken since the start of its counteroffensive at 204.7 square kilometres.

In Russia, a police station in Bryansk Oblast was reportedly hit by a drone.

The Ukrainian Finance Ministry said that it had received a $1.25 billion from the U.S. through the Multi-Donor Trust Fund of the World Bank as part of the Public Expenditures of Administrative Capacity Endurance (PEACE) program meant to support the country's wartime social program, saying that it would partly be spent on social assistance for internally-displaced persons.

A Moscow court ordered the seizure of assets of the Russian subsidiary of the metallurgical firm Metinvest, which is owned by Ukraine's richest person Rinat Akhmetov, after the country's Investigative Committee accused him of using company funds to support the Azov Brigade.

Rheinmetal said it had started training workers for the factory that it had planned to open in western Ukraine in the autumn of 2023 to repair Leopard tanks.

== August 2023 ==
=== 1 August ===
Sergei Sobyanin, the Mayor of Moscow, claimed that several drones were shot down over the city but one managed to strike the same building damaged by a drone strike on 30 July which housed offices of some federal ministries. Vnukovo Airport was also briefly closed again.

A military recruitment office in Saint Petersburg was set on fire by a man who claimed to have been contacted by the FSB to "gain access to documents sent to Ukraine". Russian media said it was the ninth such attack on recruitment centers across the country and in occupied Crimea in recent days, which authorities attributed to "phone scammers".

In Ukraine, two people were killed by Russian shelling in Kharkiv and Kherson Oblasts.

An explosion was reported near Sevastopol, with conflicting reports describing it as coming from a drone which was shot down and crashed in the mountains, or from the logistics center of the Russian Black Sea Fleet.

The Ukrainian military said it had pushed back four Russian saboteurs who tried to cross the border at Chernihiv Oblast.

The SBU said it had arrested a businesswoman in Mykolaiv Oblast for passing information on Russian airstrikes to a blogger connected with the FSB.

The Soviet emblem was removed from the Motherland Monument in Kyiv amid continuing decommunization and derussification policies in Ukraine, with authorities planning to replace the logo with that of the Tryzub, which was completed on 6 August. The redesign was made in preparation for Ukraine's Independence Day on 24 August, and the monument was to be renamed Mother-Ukraine.

Poland accused Belarus of sending two military helicopters over its airspace, which the latter denied.

A media investigation following complaints from soldiers of substandard tourniquets found that the Ukrainian military failed to purchase first aid kits in 2023 and kits supplied by its allies were not inspected properly.

=== 2 August ===
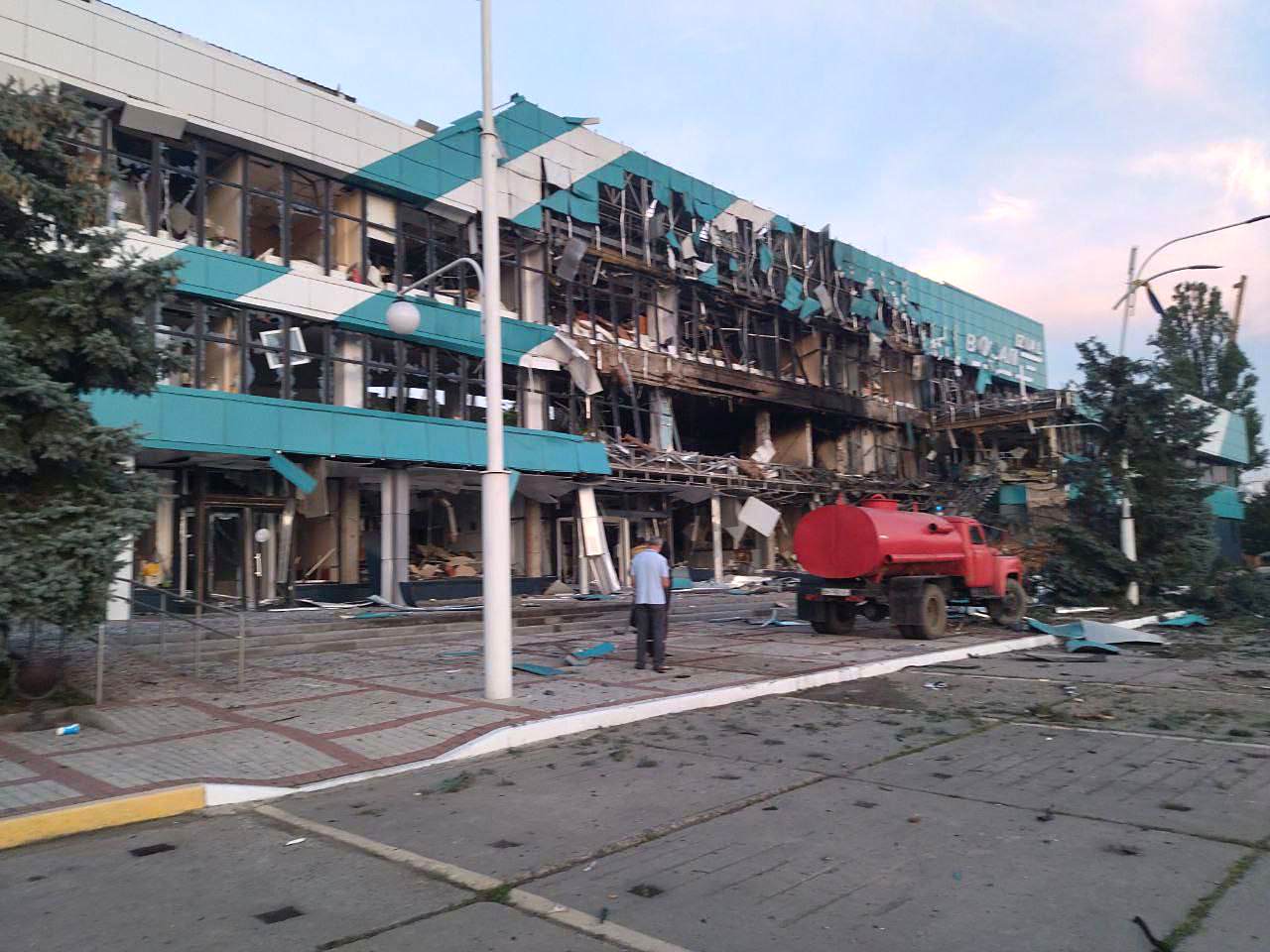
Izmail Marine Station after a drone attack

Russia launched overnight drone strikes over Kyiv, with authorities saying all ten drones launched were shot down. Another attack on the Danube river port of Izmail, Odesa Oblast, on the border with Romania, damaged grain export facilities and almost 40,000 tonnes of grain destined to African countries, China and Israel. Drone debris also reportedly landed on the adjacent Romanian town of Ceatalchioi, prompting an investigation by the Romanian government.

Two people were killed by Russian shelling in Donetsk and Zaporizhzhia Oblasts.

A Ukrainian soldier posted a video claiming to have found a Czech-made component from a Russian Lancet drone near Bakhmut. The component's manufacturer AXI Model Motors denied delivering products to the Russian military, but acknowledged that some of them had been obtained by Russia through third parties.

=== 3 August ===
Russia launched another overnight drone attack on Kyiv, with the Ukrainian military claiming to have shot down nearly a dozen drones. In Kherson, the 18th-century Saint Catherine's Cathedral, which housed the remains of nobleman Grigory Potemkin before it was taken by Russian forces during their withdrawal in 2022, was damaged by Russian shelling which also injured eight people across the city.

Two people were killed by Russian shelling in Donetsk Oblast.

In Russia, six drones were reportedly shot down over Kaluga Oblast.

The SBU arrested a lawyer who formerly represented politicians from the pro-Russian Party of Shariy, accusing him of gathering information on air defenses and potential targets for Russia to use on airstrikes in Odesa. It also launched an investigation against People's Deputy Oleksandr Dubinsky for allegedly going on holiday in Spain under false pretenses despite wartime restrictions.

The EU announced more sanctions on Belarus, extending a ban on exports of highly sensitive goods and technologies contributing to the Belarusian military, and imposing an additional export ban on firearms and ammunition, as well as goods that can be used in the aviation and space industries. The European Commission said that sanctions were also meant to ensure that Russia could no longer use Belarus to evade sanctions.

=== 4 August ===
Russia claimed to have thwarted an attack by two Ukrainian naval drones on its naval base in Novorossiysk, Krasnodar Krai, and shot down ten drones over Crimea. However, a Ukrainian intelligence source claimed the naval attack caused a "serious breach" to the Olenegorsky Gornyak, a Ropucha-class landing ship. Some 100 personnel were on board at the time. Separately, a source within the port said an unnamed ship had lost power forcing it to be towed ashore. Normal port operations were maintained during and after the attack.

The Ukrainian Defence Ministry said its forces had managed to break through the Russian first line of defense and were moving to "intermediate" lines in some sections of the southern front.

In Russia, two administrative buildings and a church were reportedly damaged in a drone attack in Kursk.

The SBU accused Russia of plotting to stage a false flag attack on the Mozyr oil refinery in Belarus to draw the latter into fully joining the Russian war effort in Ukraine, citing a Russian POW.

Poland arrested a Belarusian national suspected of being a member of a Russian spy ring tasked with derailing trains carrying aid to Ukraine and inciting anti-Ukrainian sentiment.

An IAEA inspection of the Zaporizhzhia Nuclear Power Plant found no mines or explosives on the roofs of two of the plant's six reactors, but found that mines laid around the plant grounds which had been observed during prior inspections were still in place.

Ukraine issued a NOTMAR announcement declaring a "war risk area" in the Russian Black Sea ports of Anapa, Novorossiysk, Gelendzhik, Tuapse, Sochi and Taman.

Former Ukrainian MP Serhiy Slabenko was killed in action in the Zaporizhzhia front.

=== 5 August ===
Residents reported an explosion near the Crimean Bridge, with reports saying that it was caused by a naval drone that damaged the Russian-flagged tanker Sig in the Kerch Strait, 27 kilometers south of the bridge, which was closed to traffic and had its lighting turned off. TASS quoted Russia's Marine Rescue Co-ordination Centre who said that the ship's engine room was damaged but no casualties were reported. Two tugs were sent to assist the ship.

Later in the day, Russia launched a wave of missile strikes across Ukraine, with attacks reported on facilities of the aeronautical firm Motor Sich in Khmelnytskyi and Zaporizhzhia Oblasts, as well as on Zhytomyr and on a blood transfusion facility in Kupiansk, Kharkiv Oblast, killing two people and injuring four. Three people were killed by Russian shelling in Donetsk and Sumy Oblasts.

The Russian-installed mayor of Donetsk claimed that a building of the Donetsk National University of Economics and Trade was set on fire by Ukrainian cluster munitions.

Russia claimed it had taken the village of Novoselivske, Luhansk Oblast, in the Kupiansk sector. However, the Ukrainian military denied the claim, saying that it had pushed back a Russian attack there.

Rami al-Farra, a resident of the Gaza Strip who moved to Russia following the Hamas takeover in 2007 and volunteered to fight in Ukraine under the Russian Defence Ministry, was reportedly killed in action, making him the first confirmed Palestinian fatality in the invasion.

=== 6 August ===
A drone was reportedly shot down near Moscow, causing interruptions again at Vnukovo airport. The Ukrainian military struck the Chonhar bridge again with missiles, along with a smaller bridge on the Kherson-Crimea road in Henichesk. Pro-Russian officials presented images showing a hole in the middle of the roadway at Chonhar and claimed that Russian air defences shot down nine out of 12 missiles reportedly launched. Analysts believed that the strike was carried out by French or British supplied Storm Shadow missiles fired from Su-24s.

One person was killed by Russian shelling in Kharkiv Oblast.

=== 7 August ===
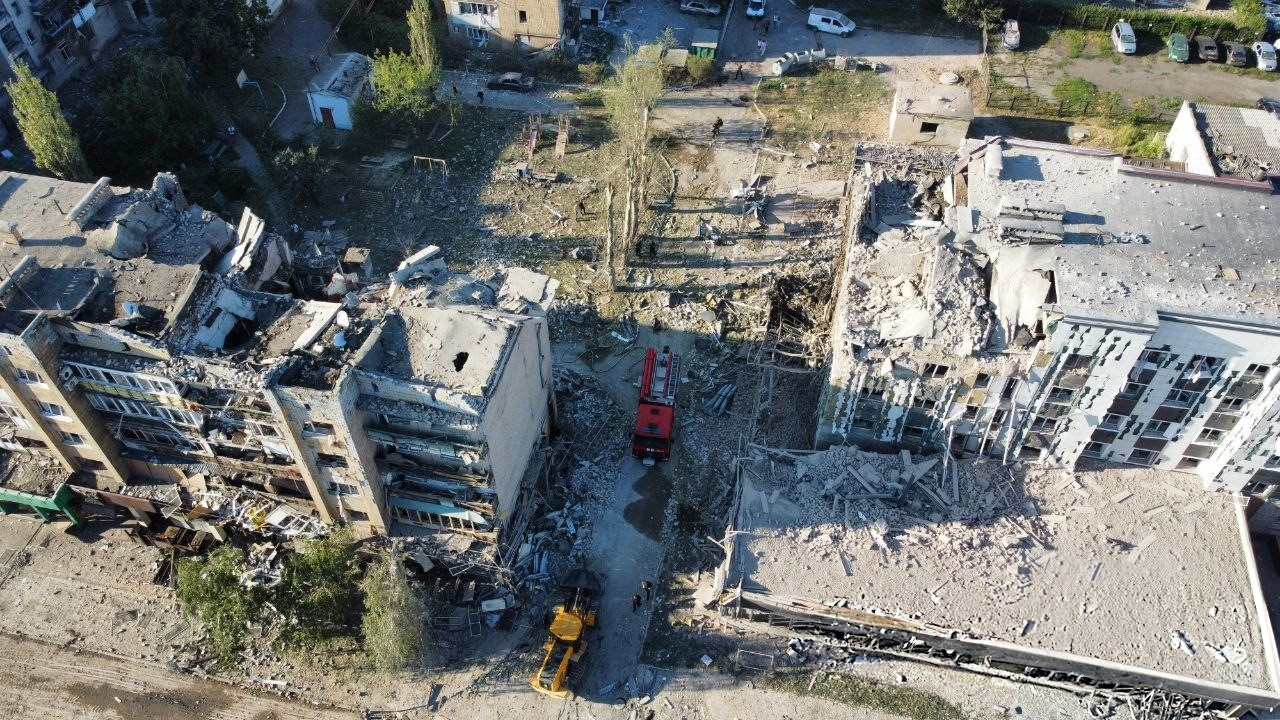
Buildings in Pokrovsk after an attack

Ten people were killed and 82 injured by two Russian missile strikes on a residential area in Pokrovsk, Donetsk Oblast in what Ukraine called a "double tap" attack that first hit residents and then rescuers who arrived in the area 37 minutes later.

Seven people were killed in separate Russian attacks in Dnipropetrovsk, Kharkiv and Kherson Oblasts.

22 POWs were returned to Ukraine after a prisoner swap with Russia.

In Russia, two drones were reportedly shot down over Belgorod and Kaluga Oblasts.

The SBU arrested a woman in relation to an attempt to assassinate President Zelenskyy during his visit to Mykolaiv in the previous week, accusing her of supplying information for a Russian air strike.

A Russian Ka-52 helicopter was reported shot down over Robotyne, Zaporizhzhia Oblast.

=== 8 August ===
The ISW, citing Russian milbloggers, reported that Ukrainian forces aboard seven boats had crossed the Dnipro river again near Kozachi Laheri, Kherson Oblast, and advanced by 800 meters after breaching Russian defenses. A source from the Ukrainian military later claimed to the Kyiv Independent that it had staged a raid there that captured 16 Russian soldiers.

One person was killed by Russian shelling in Nikopol.

The SBU claimed it had thwarted an attempted cyberattack by a Russian hacking group called Sandworm using ten types of malware to collect intelligence from devices used by Ukrainian soldiers.

The U.K. Foreign Office announced its largest sanctions against third parties supporting the Russian war effort in Ukraine. Among those sanctioned included two Turkish firms supplying microelectronics components, a UAE-based firm supplying drones and drone components, Iranian individuals and entities involved in the drone industry, Belarusian defense organizations linked to the manufacturing of military technology, three Russian electronics companies procuring Western microelectronics and 22 other individuals facilitating foreign military supplies to Russia.

Rheinmetall purchased 50 Leopard 1 tanks from a private stockpile owned by Freddy Versluys, CEO of Belgian defense company OIP Land Systems to donate to Ukraine. The tanks had been bought from the Belgian military when the latter was cutting expenditures before the government unsuccessfully tried to buy them back again to donate to Ukraine.

=== 9 August ===
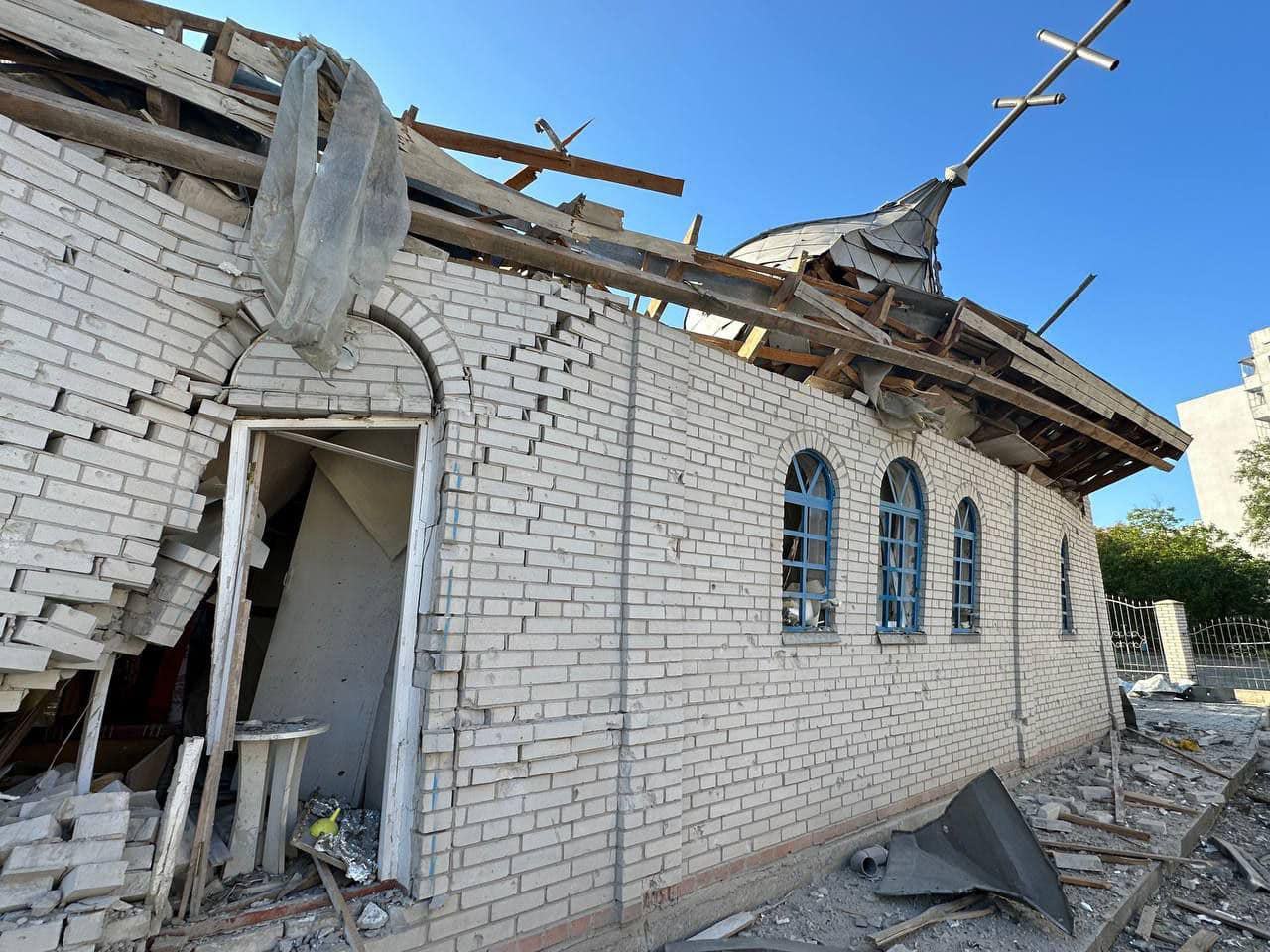
Destroyed church in Zaporizhzhia

Three people were killed in a Russian missile attack in Zaporizhzhia.

A Russian pilot, later identified as Maxim Kuzminov, defected to Ukraine, taking along his Mi-8 helicopter following a six-month operation by Ukrainian military intelligence, with the pilot's family also being extracted from Russia. During the defection, two crewmembers who were unaware of what was happening were reportedly killed. At a press conference on 4 September, he revealed he had also brought "stolen fighter jet spare parts" and received $500,000 as a reward.

The Mayor of Moscow said that two Ukrainian drones were shot down over the city's outskirts. The Governor of Bryansk Oblast claimed that Ukrainian shelling damaged buildings and infrastructure in the town of Bila Berezka.

A large explosion (see Russian mystery fires (2022–present)) occurred at Zagorsk Optical-Mechanical Plant, or "ZOMZ", a company that develops optical and optoelectronic devices for law enforcement, industry, healthcare, and Russian military uses. The explosion and damage was later considered a possible contributor to delays in Lancet drone production. Russian state media blamed an accidental explosion at a nearby storage owned by Piro Ross, a company that supplies fireworks for the Russian Ministry of Defense. Piro Ross CEO Sergei Chankaev denied the company's involvement in the explosion, saying no explosive materials were held in the facility at the time. Eyewitnesses claimed a drone struck the facility shortly before the explosion. The Governor of the Moscow Region, Andrey Vorobyov, later claimed that, despite its name, the plant primarily produces pyrotechnics.

The SBU arrested a woman in Zhytomyr Oblast who recently moved there from Donetsk Oblast on charges of spying for Russia and aiding airstrikes.

Germany delivered a military aid package to Ukraine that included two Patriot missile systems, 10 BV206 all-terrain vehicles, over 6,500 rounds of 155mm smoke ammunition, four Vector reconnaissance drones, five border protection vehicles, six truck tractor trains with six semi-trailers, two load-handling trucks, 100 MG5 machine guns, 40,000 first aid kits, explosive ordnance disposal material, binoculars, and safety glasses.

=== 10 August ===
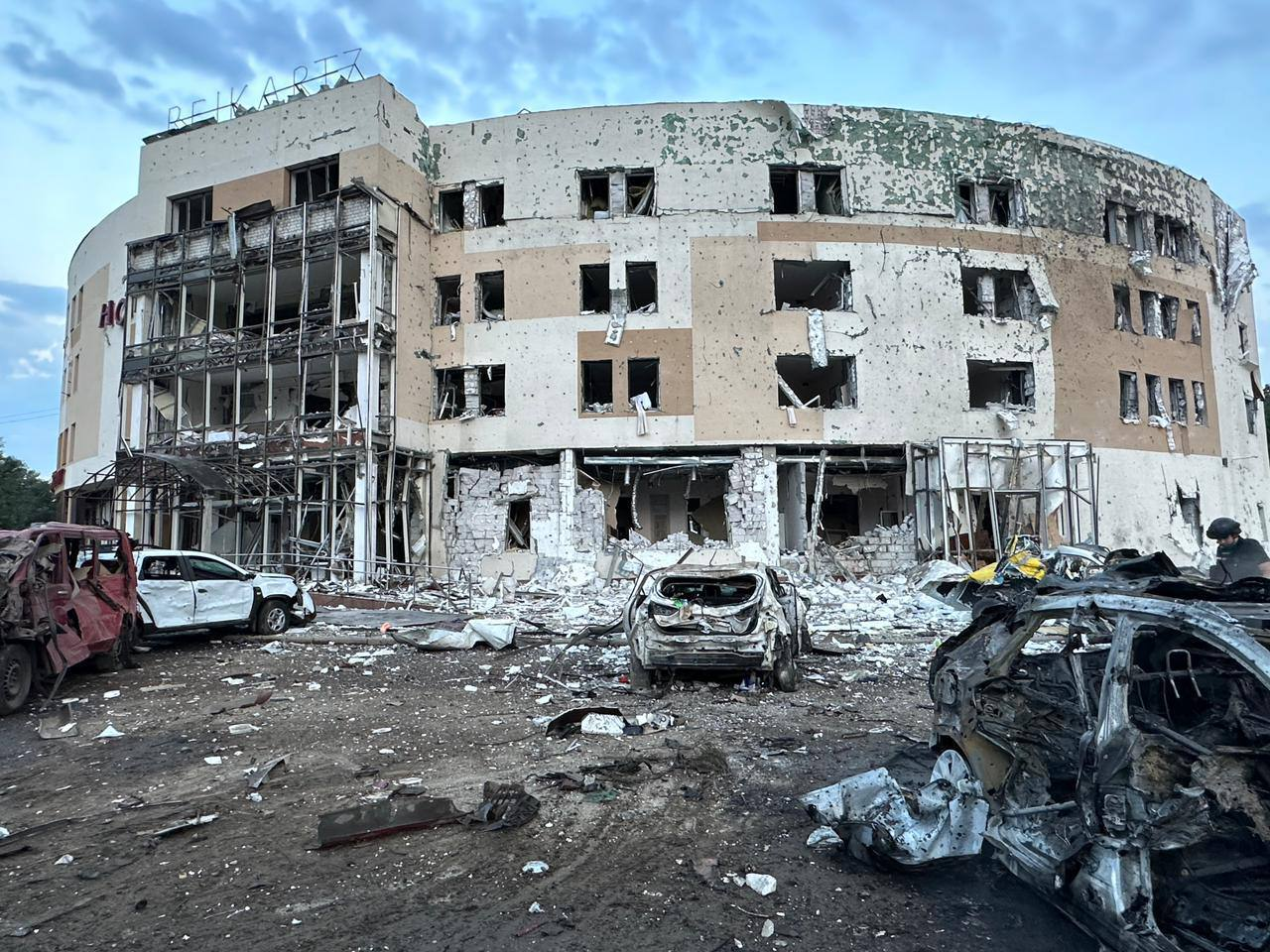
A destroyed hotel in Zaporizhzhia, used as the main base for United Nations staff

One person was killed and 16 others injured in another Russian missile strike in Zaporizhzhia city that struck a hotel hosting UN personnel, while four others were killed in separate attacks in Donetsk, Kharkiv and Zaporizhzhia Oblasts. An oil depot in Dubno Raion, Rivne Oblast was destroyed in a "massive" overnight Russian drone attack.

Ukraine ordered the mandatory evacuation of civilians from 37 settlements in Kupiansk Raion in Kharkiv Oblast due to increased Russian attacks and shelling. The Ukrainian Navy announced new temporary routes for civilian vessels moving to or from its Black Sea ports amid the Russian blockade.

Russia claimed to have shot down 11 drones near Sevastopol and two more near Moscow. Two people were reportedly killed by Ukrainian shelling in the village of Chausy, Bryansk Oblast.

The Ukrainian National Agency on Corruption Prevention added the alcohol distiller Bacardi to its International Sponsors of War list for continuing to do business in Russia despite previously promising to pull out following the invasion. An investigation by the newspaper Dzerkalo Tyzhnia and the Interior Ministry found that $33 million worth of "winter" clothes purchased by the Ukrainian Defence Ministry for the military in 2022 turned out to be summer attire that could not be used for its original purposes. The defence ministry said the contracts for the clothes were concluded between the producer and a military unit without the ministry's involvement.

Azerbaijan pledged a mechanized demining machine to Ukraine and offered training by its demining experts for Ukrainian sappers.

=== 11 August ===
Russia launched missile attacks on Kyiv and in Khmelnytskyi and Vinnytsia Oblasts. Missile debris reportedly caused damage to civilian properties in Kyiv. A child was killed in a missile attack in Ivano-Frankivsk Oblast, while another person was killed in Kherson. The Ukrainian Air Force later said that four missiles were launched towards Kolomyia airfield in Ivano-Frankivsk Oblast, adding that they had shot down one of them over Kyiv.

The ISW, citing geolocated footage, assessed that Ukrainian forces had reached the northern outskirts of the village of Robotyne in the Zaporizhzhia front and the settlement of Urozhaine in the southern Donetsk front.

In Russia, a drone was reportedly shot down west of Moscow.

President Zelenskyy ordered the dismissal of all heads of all regional military enlistment offices across Ukraine after a nationwide inspection of recruitment offices revealed multiple violations, including corruption, power abuse, and fraud, adding that they were to be replaced with officers with combat experience who have been cleared by the SBU.

The SBU arrested a resident of Odesa for passing information on military bases and Russian airstrikes to the FSB.

The Netherlands donated six mobile medical complexes to the State Border Guard Service of Ukraine.

The United States announced sanctions against the Russian Association of Employers and the Russian Union of Industrialists and Entrepreneurs (RSPP), as well as four officials of the Alfa Group conglomerate, namely oligarchs Mikhail Fridman, Petr Aven, German Khan, and Alexey Kuzmichev, for their role in financing the Russian war effort in Ukraine and in helping Russia evade previous sanctions.

=== 12 August ===
Two people, a police officer and a 73-year-old woman, were killed in separate Russian attacks in Kharkiv and Zaporizhzhia Oblasts, and a missile struck Kryvyi Rih.

Russia claimed to have shot down 20 drones over Crimea, forcing the closure of the Crimean Bridge to traffic for two hours. Officials also claimed that Ukraine tried to strike the bridge with three S-200 missiles but were unsuccessful due to interception by air defences.

An explosion was reported in the port of occupied Berdiansk.

Ukrainian authorities reopened Odesa's beaches to swimmers for the first time since the invasion, but banned bathing during air raid alerts.

=== 13 August ===
Five people, including a family of four, were killed by Russian shelling in Shyroka Balka, Kherson Oblast, while four others were killed in separate attacks in nearby Stanislav and Stepne, Zaporizhzhia Oblast.

Ukraine claimed to have struck two ammunition depots and a site that hosted a "group" of Russian troops in Oleshky, Kherson Oblast, Reuters, citing pro-Russian officials, reported that Ukrainian soldiers had gained a foothold in the northern part of Urozhaine.

In occupied Mariupol, Ukrainian partisans reportedly set fire to a Russian military base near the Azovstal complex, resulting in the loss of at least ten Russian soldiers, three trucks, and five cars. In the nearby village of Urzuf, at least seven civilians were reported to have been killed in a crossfire during infighting between Chechen and regular Russian soldiers.

Russia claimed to have shot down two Ukrainian drones over Belgorod Oblast, while a third damaged a building in Belgorod city. Three people were reportedly injured by shelling in Volfino, Kursk Oblast.

In the Black Sea, the Russian patrol ship Vasily Bykov fired warning shots at the Turkish-owned, Palau-flagged cargo ship Sukru Okan en route to Izmail. The ship was subsequently boarded by Russian inspectors on board a Ka-29 helicopter before it was allowed to set sail. The incident was the first of its kind since Russia's withdrawal from the Black Sea Grain Initiative on 17 July.

A Turkish charter plane from Oslo to Antalya belonging to BBN Airlines briefly entered the no-fly zone imposed over Ukrainian airspace since the invasion, passing through Zakarpattia and Chernivtsi Oblasts before exiting into Romania. The Norwegian public broadcaster NRK reported that the pilots were forced to enter Ukraine after a storm forced a deviation of their original flight plan.

=== 14 August ===
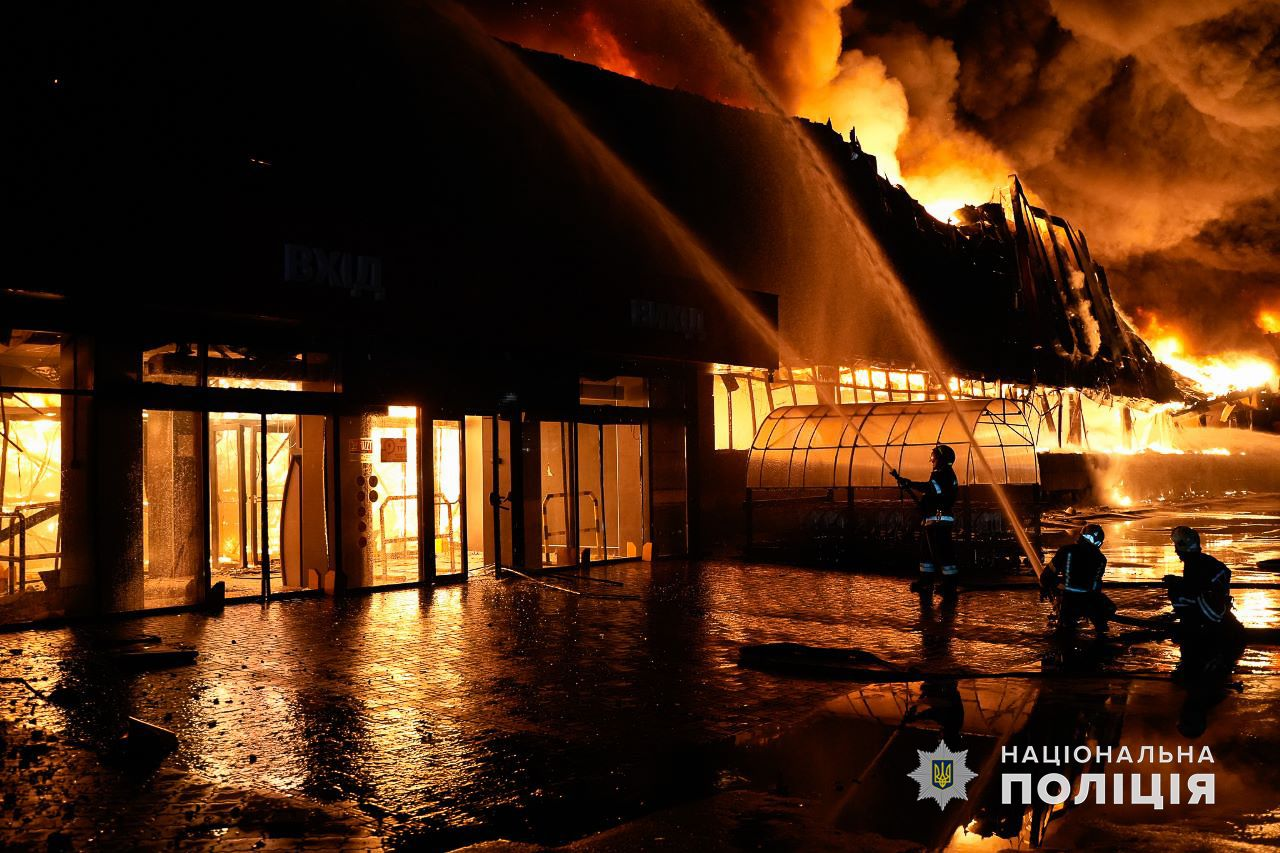
Burnt hypermarket in Odesa after an attack

Russia launched an overnight air attack on Odesa, causing several fires and injuring three. Authorities said 203 buildings in the city were damaged, while the Air Force claimed to have shot all 23 drones and missiles launched.

One person was killed by Russian shelling in Kharkiv Oblast.

The Ukrainian Defence Ministry claimed its forces had retaken three square kilometers of territory near Bakhmut in the past week, while President Zelenskyy made another visit to Ukrainian positions there.

The United States proposed a new military aid package to Ukraine valued at $200 million which would include "air defense munitions, artillery rounds, and additional mine-clearing equipment".

Rheinmetall said it would supply Luna drones to Ukraine by the end of the year.

=== 15 August ===
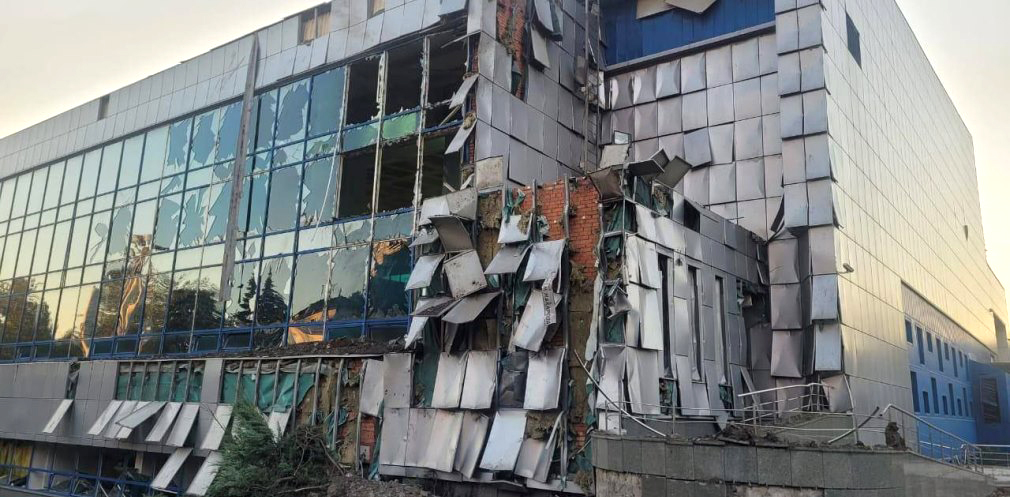
Palace of water sports in Dnipro city after an attack

Russia launched another overnight wave of air attacks across Ukraine, with explosions reported in Lutsk, where three people were killed in a strike at an industrial facility, as well as in the cities of Lviv and Dnipro and the oblasts of Kyiv, Zaporizhzhia, Cherkasy, Ivano-Frankivsk and Khmelnytskyi. The Ukrainian Air Force claimed it had shot down 16 out of 28 missiles launched. Four people were killed in separate attacks in Donetsk Oblast.

The Ukrainian military said it had prevented two Russian sabotage groups from entering Chernihiv Oblast. The Azov Brigade returned to action for the first time since the Siege of Mariupol, participating in military actions in the Serebrianskyi forest of Luhansk Oblast. President Zelenskyy visited Ukrainian positions at the Zaporizhzhia front.

Ukraine accused Russia of preparing to stage a false-flag attack at the Kursk Nuclear Power Plant.

The Russian frigate Admiral Makarov returned to active duty after being damaged by a Ukrainian naval raid on Sevastopol in October 2022.

Stian Jenssen, chief of staff to NATO Secretary General Jens Stoltenberg, suggested that Ukraine cede territory to Russia in exchange for NATO membership. Ukrainian Foreign Minister Dmytro Kuleba called the proposal "ridiculous", and Jenssen subsequently withdrew his remarks, calling it a "mistake".

=== 16 August ===
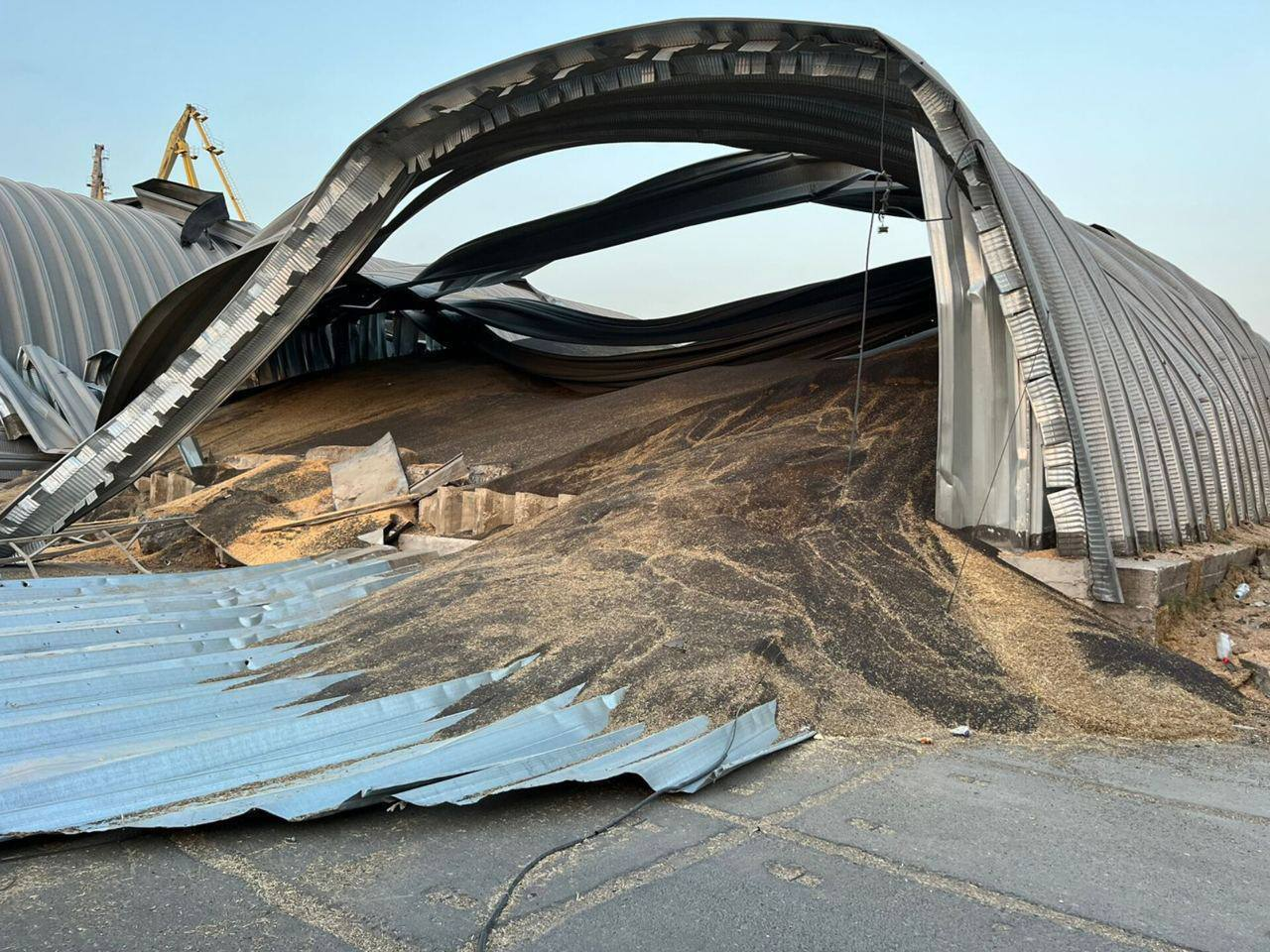
Granary in the Odesa region after a drone attack

Russia launched an overnight drone attack on Reni, damaging port and grain infrastructure. Three people were killed in separate attacks in Kharkiv, Kherson and Dnipropetrovsk Oblasts.

Ukraine claimed it had completely retaken Urozhaine.

Russia claimed to have downed three Ukrainian drones in Kaluga Oblast. and "eliminated" a group of four Ukrainian fighters who entered Bryansk Oblast.

The Hong Kong-flagged container ship Joseph Schulte, which had been trapped in Odesa since the invasion, left for Turkey in the first voyage of its kind since the Russian withdrawal from the Black Sea Grain Initiative under Ukraine's recently implemented temporary corridor.

A court in Russian-occupied Donetsk Oblast sentenced two members of the Azov Brigade to 24 years in prison for alleged war crimes during the Siege of Mariupol.

The Czech Republic imposed sanctions on Russian oligarch and CEO of missile manufacturer Tactical Missiles Corporation (KTRV) Boris Obnosov, along with his daughter Olga and son-in-law, Rostislav Zorikov, both of whom had been living in Prague since 2020. The sanctions included a ban on entry into the country and an asset freeze. The United States also imposed sanctions on three firms owned or managed by Slovak businessman Ashot Mkrtychev for attempting to facilitate North Korean arms exports to Russia.

The ISW reported that Russian lawmakers introduced a law that would ban photos and videos showing Russian military locations and deployments except those from the Defense Ministry and impose fines of up to 500,000 rubles or imprisonment for three years.

=== 17 August ===
Two people were killed by Russian shelling in Donetsk and Kharkiv Oblasts.

The Ukrainian military claimed to have shot down two Ka-52 helicopters. One was downed near Robotyne with a MANPAD, a second was downed by the air force near Bakhmut.

Russia claimed to have shot down a drone over Belgorod Oblast and thwarted a naval drone attack on its Black Sea Fleet.

The SBU arrested a resident of Kyiv suspected of passing information to Russian military intelligence on military and energy infrastructure to use in future airstrikes.

Germany sent a military aid package to Ukraine consisting of two IRIS-T SLM air defense systems, 10 ground surveillance radar systems, four truck tractor trains, four semi-trailers, eight load-handling trucks and 4,500 rounds of 155 mm ammunition. General Daniel Zmeko, chief of the General Staff of the Armed Forces of the Slovak Republic, visited Ukrainian positions in the southern front.

The United States approved the transfer of F-16s from the Netherlands and Denmark to Ukraine after Ukrainian pilots have completed their training.

The NACP added the Chinese technology and e-commerce firm Alibaba to its "international sponsors of war" list for fiscally supporting Russia through paying taxes, facilitating the sale of copper from the Debaltseve Metallurgical Engineering Plant in occupied Luhansk Oblast, and censoring Ukrainian content on its platforms related to the war while leaving Russian posts unchecked.

=== 18 August ===
The Mayor of Moscow claimed a drone was intercepted over the city center, with falling debris damaging the Expocentre. TASS, citing an emergency services source, reported that an outside wall had partly collapsed and the Vnukovo Airport was briefly shut down. The Russian MoD said that the drone "changed its flight path" after being detected by air defenses and flew into an empty non-residential building.

One person was killed by Russian shelling in Kherson Oblast.

Ukrainian military intelligence reported that an apparent drone attack struck the headquarters of the pro-Russian police in Enerhodar, injuring its chief, Colonel Pavlo Chesanov, his deputy and several senior officers.

The Washington Post reported that the Polish domestic intelligence service, the ABW, had thwarted an attempt by Russian intelligence to disrupt the transit of Western arms in the country to Ukraine using eastern Ukrainian refugees, adding that 16 people had been arrested, 12 of them Ukrainian.

Russia announced sanctions on 54 UK nationals and individuals working for UK institutions in retaliation for sanctions previously imposed by the British government over the invasion of Ukraine. Among those sanctioned were ICC Chief Prosecutor Karim Ahmad Khan, Culture Secretary Lucy Frazer, Minister of State for Defence Annabel Goldie, and executives and journalists from the BBC, the Daily Telegraph and The Guardian.

Russian oil businessman Eugene Shvidler lost his High Court challenge against sanctions imposed on him by the UK government after the Russian invasion of Ukraine.

=== 19 August ===
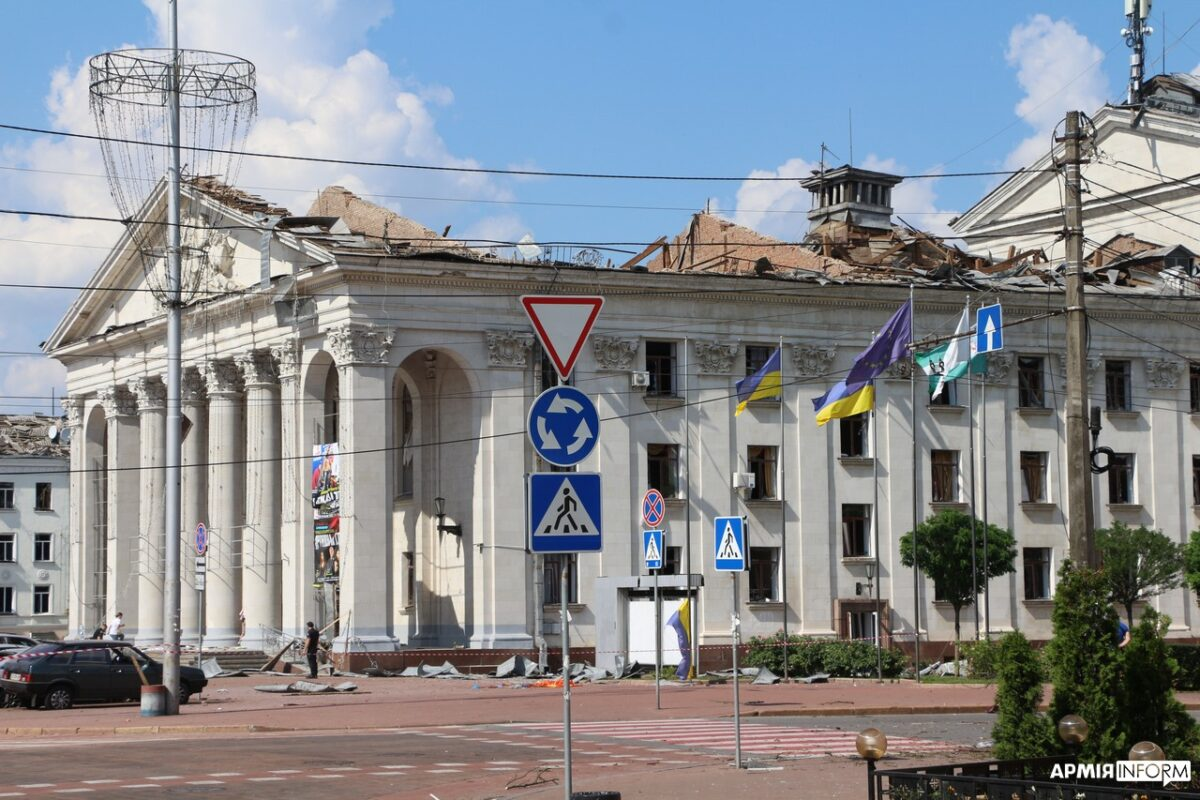
Chernihiv Theatre of Music and Drama after missile attack, with destroyed roof shown.

At least seven people, including a child, were killed and 156 others were injured in a Russian missile attack on Krasna Square in central Chernihiv that also damaged the city's drama theater and the Chernihiv Polytechnic National University. Most of the victims were on their way to church to celebrate the Feast of the Transfiguration, while the theater was hosting a gathering of drone manufacturers. One person was killed in a separate attack in Zaporizhzhia Oblast, while more than 400 buildings were damaged by drone attacks in Medzhybizh and Derazhnia, both in Khmelnytskyi Oblast.

The Russian military claimed to have shot down a Ukrainian missile over Crimea and "eliminated" about 150 Ukrainian soldiers trying to establish a foothold in the left bank of the Dnipro.

In Russia, a Tu-22M was reportedly damaged and another destroyed in an attack on an airfield in Soltsy, Novgorod Oblast.

Ukrainian officials announced that Ukrainian pilots had begun training on the usage of F-16 and Swedish Gripen fighter jets. During his visit to Stockholm, President Zelenskyy began talks with the Swedish government over acquiring Saab JAS 39 Gripen fighters. He also announced that Ukraine would soon start manufacturing Swedish CV90 combat vehicles, while the Swedish government was working on a new military aid package worth $313.5 million.

The US announced an 18-month extension of the Temporary Protected Status (TPS) granted to Ukrainian refugees since the start of the invasion.

President Putin visited the headquarters of the Southern Military District in Rostov-on-Don as part of his first visit to the city since the Wagner Rebellion, meeting with commanders responsible for operations in Ukraine.

=== 20 August ===
In Russia, a drone reportedly set fire to the roof of Kursk railway station, injuring five people. More drones were reported in Rostov Oblast, Belgorod and Moscow, forcing the closure of Vnukovo and Domodedovo airports.

Four people were killed by Russian shelling in Kherson, Kharkiv and Zaporizhzhia Oblasts.

During a visit to the Netherlands, President Zelenskyy announced that Ukraine would be receiving 42 F-16 fighter jets. After his arrival in Denmark later that day, Prime Minister Mette Frederiksen announced that the country would supply Ukraine with the first batch of six F-16 fighter jets out of 19 promised before the end of the year.

=== 21 August ===
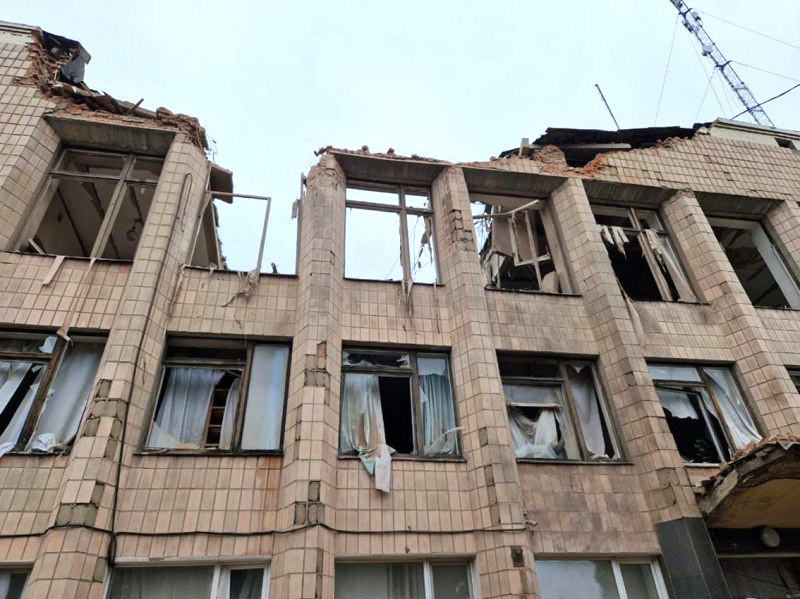
City council of Semenivka (Chernihiv region) after a Russian drone strike

Two people were injured by falling debris from a Ukrainian drone strike on Moscow. Some fifty flights were disrupted at Vnukovo, Domodedovo, Sheremetyevo and Zhunovsky airports. Russia claimed to have shot down one drone and jammed another.

Three people were killed by Russian shelling in Chernihiv, Donetsk and Zaporizhzhia Oblasts.

The Ukrainian Defence Ministry said that its forces had retaken three square kilometers of territory in the southern flank of Bakhmut in the past week, while Ukrainian military intelligence claimed that a Russian warplane was damaged in a drone attack in Kaluga Oblast.

Courts in the Russian-occupied Donbas sentenced five captured Ukrainian soldiers to up to 20 years imprisonment for alleged war crimes, some of which were purportedly committed during the Siege of Mariupol.

During his visit to Athens, President Zelenskyy announced that Greece had would train Ukrainian pilots on its F-16 fleet.

For the second consecutive year, destroyed Russian tanks and vehicles were installed in central Kyiv in a parade format as part of the 32nd anniversary celebrations of Ukrainian Independence Day.

=== 22 August ===
In Russia, two drones were shot down near Moscow, with one hitting a 25-story building in Krasnogorsk, and resulting in the closure of the city's major airports. Two other drones were reportedly shot down over Bryansk Oblast, while two more were shot down over the Black Sea northwest of Crimea.

The Russian defence ministry claimed one of its fighter jets destroyed a Ukrainian reconnaissance boat sailing near Russian gas production facilities along the Black Sea.

Six people were killed by Russian shelling in Donetsk and Kherson Oblasts.

Ukrainian military intelligence claimed that Russia had sunk a ferry in the Kerch Strait and was planning to sink a total of six vessels in the waterway to provide a protective lane in the water in front of the Crimean Bridge.

General Sergey Surovikin, former commander of Russian forces in Ukraine, was removed as commander of the Russian Aerospace Forces according to reports.

Ukraine announced plans to create a new military police force to replace the existing agency, which would be given powers to investigate war crimes, military indiscipline and other law enforcement functions.

=== 23 August ===
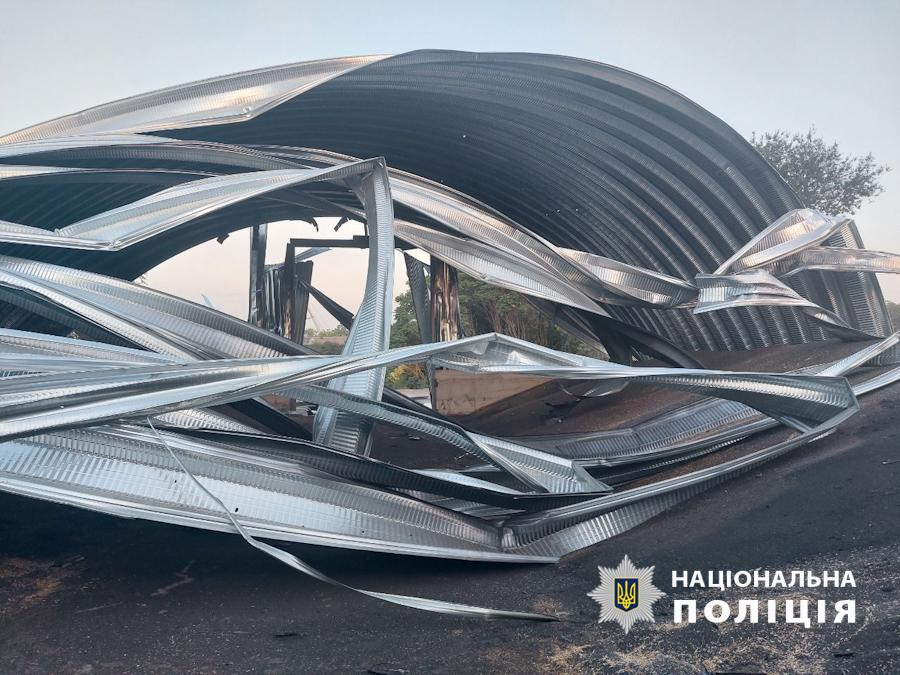
Destroyed granary in Odesa Oblast

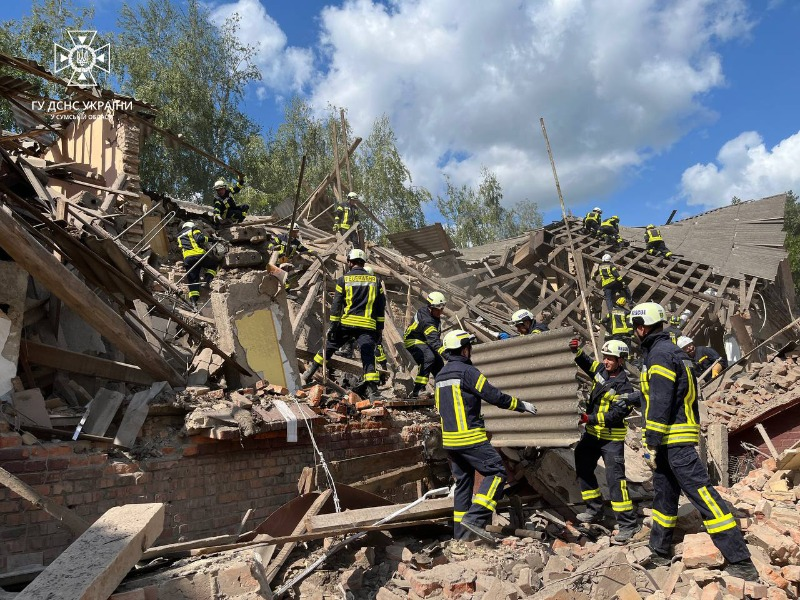
Destroyed school in Romny, Sumy Oblast

In Russia, two drones were reportedly shot down over Moscow Oblast, while the third was jammed electronically where it crashed into an under-construction building in central Moscow, leading to the temporary closure of the city's airports. The Governor of Belgorod Oblast said that another drone struck a sanatorium in the village of Lavy, killing three.

Russia launched an overnight drone attack on southern Ukraine, with a grain storage facility on the Danube partially burning down. The Ukrainian military said it had intercepted 11 of 20 drones launched at Odesa and Zaporizhzhia Oblasts. Four faculty members were killed, while four passersby were injured in a separate drone attack on a school in Romny, Sumy Oblast. One person was killed in a separate attack in Chasiv Yar.

Ukraine claimed to have "wiped out" a Russian long- and medium-range S-400 missile defense system known as "Triumph," destroying all missiles and personnel, near the village of Olenivka near Cape Tarkhankut in Crimea. According to reports, Ukrainian forces used a land attack variant of their domestically-produced R-360 Neptune missile.

Serhii Ilnytskyi, a member of the Kyiv City Council and a retired colonel of the Ukrainian Volunteer Army, was killed in action in Kurdiumivka on the Donetsk front.

On his visit to Kyiv, Finnish Prime Minister Petteri Orpo announced the country's 18th military aid package to Ukraine, which was later announced to be worth 94 million euros ($101.5 million).

Wagner Group leaders Yevgeny Prigozhin, Dmitry Utkin and Valery Chekalov were killed along with seven others after their plane crashed in Kuzhenkino in Tver Oblast, outside Moscow. Russian authorities were yet to determine the cause of the disaster, but US intelligence believed that the crash may have been caused by a deliberate on-board explosion.

=== 24 August ===
The Ukrainian Navy and military intelligence conducted an overnight "special operation" on the western tip of Crimea, with amphibious landings near the towns of Olenivka and Maiak. The Ukrainian military claimed that it had attained its objectives, inflicted enemy casualties and equipment losses, and raised the Ukrainian flag there.

On the 32nd Ukrainian Independence Day, Russian attacks on Dnipro and Kherson wounded thirteen people, including a seven-year-old girl. Four others were injured in an attack on a supermarket in Kurakhove, Donetsk Oblast. One person was killed by shelling in Kherson Oblast. The UK Foreign Office claimed that Russia launched an unsuccessful attack on a Liberian-flagged cargo ship docked in Odesa using missiles.

President Zelenskyy announced that Portugal would help train Ukrainian pilots on the usage of F-16 fighter jets, while Norway pledged at least two F-16s to Ukraine. The Norwegian government also pledged $140 million (1.5 billion NOK) to ensure the delivery of energy supplies to Ukraine. The Lithuanian Defence Ministry announced a 41 million-euro ($44 million) military aid package that would include ammunition for Carl Gustaf multi-purpose grenade launchers, rifles, maritime surveillance radar sets, 5.56 mm caliber ammunition, generators, anti-drone systems, and NASAMS launchers. Germany delivered Patriot missiles, eight drone detection systems, and 40 RQ-35 HEIDRUN reconnaissance drones to Ukraine as part of a new military aid package. The Pentagon announced that training of Ukrainian pilots on the use of F-16s in the US would begin in September in Texas and Arizona, facilitated by the Air National Guard’s 162nd Wing.

The US imposed sanctions on more entities and individuals linked to the abduction and deportation of Ukrainian children to Russia. Among those sanctioned were the commissioners for children's rights in Belgorod, Kaluga, and Rostov Oblasts. Individuals in Chechnya were also targeted, including the republican commissioner for human rights, the chairman of the republican government, the Akhmat Kadyrov Foundation, its board member Aymani Kadyrova, who is also the mother of Chechen leader Ramzan Kadyrov, and a special police battalion commander, all of which were involved in the detention of children in camps outside Grozny. The U.S. also sanctioned the Russian government-owned Artek "summer camp" located in Crimea, its director Konstantin Fedorenko, the Chief of Staff of the Sevastopol Branch of the Russian Youth Army Vladimir Kovalenko and the head of Sevastopol State University Vladimir Nechaev. Olena Shapurova, a Russian-appointed education official, was also sanctioned for implementing pro-Russian educational policies in occupied Zaporizhzhia Oblast and threatening to remove children whose parents boycotted pro-Russian schools.

The NAPC added tobacco manufacturers Philip Morris International and Japan Tobacco International to its list of international sponsors of the Russian war effort in Ukraine for continuing to do business in the country and supporting its economy.

Russian political activist Maxim Katz, who fled to exile in Israel, was sentenced in absentia to eight years in prison by a Moscow court for reporting atrocities by the Russian military in Ukraine on YouTube, including the Bucha Massacre.

=== 25 August ===
Russia claimed to have shot down 42 Ukrainian drones over Crimea, while an S-200 missile was reportedly shot down over Obninsk, Kaluga Oblast, forcing the temporary closure of Vnukovo and Domodedovo airports in Moscow. Explosions were also reported in Tula Oblast. The Ukrainian military, in conjunction with the SBU, launched a drone strike on the 126th Coastal Defence Brigade of the Russian Black Sea Fleet based in Perevalne in Simferopol Raion, Crimea, reportedly inflicting "dozens" of casualties.

Three people were killed by Russian shelling in Dnipropetrovsk and Kharkiv Oblasts.

11 Ukrainian children deported to Russia were returned to the country by the NGO Save Ukraine.

Putin signed a decree ordering the Wagner Group and other paramilitary fighters to swear an "oath of allegiance" to the Russian state.

=== 26 August ===
In Russia, a drone was shot down near Moscow, prompting the closure of the city's airports. The governor of Belgorod Oblast claimed that a drone was shot down near the village of Kupino, while Ukrainian shelling damaged buildings and injured four in the village of Urazovo, while another drone killed one person in the village of Shchetinovka. A drone attack was also reported in Bryansk Oblast.

The Liberian-flagged bulk carrier Primus left Odesa for Varna, Bulgaria, the second ship to do so under the temporary corridor introduced by Ukraine in the Black Sea.

Three Ukrainian Air Force pilots were killed in a mid-air collision between two L-39 trainers over Sinhury, Zhytomyr Oblast. One of the pilots killed was Andrii Pilshchykov, call sign 'Juice', who engaged in dogfights during the Battle of Kyiv and was known for giving media interviews during which he advocated for the delivery of F-16 fighter jets to Ukraine.

Yandex co-founder and former CEO Arkady Volozh formally petitioned the EU to lift sanctions placed against him over his search engine's promotion of Russian propaganda, after he publicly denounced the invasion of Ukraine as "barbaric" on 10 August.

=== 27 August ===
Two people were killed by Russian shelling in Kharkiv and Kherson Oblasts. Two people were injured by falling missile debris in Kyiv Oblast, with the Ukrainian military claiming to have shot down four cruise missiles over central and northern Ukraine.

The ISW assessed that Ukrainian forces were attacking towards the rear Russian defensive lines near Verbove in the Zaporizhzhia front.

In Russia, a drone flew into a residential building in Kursk, causing minor damage. 16 drones were reportedly launched in an overnight attack on an airfield in Kursk Oblast, which destroyed four Su-30 fighter jets and one MIG-29. An S-300 complex radar and two Pantsir missile systems were also struck.

=== 28 August ===
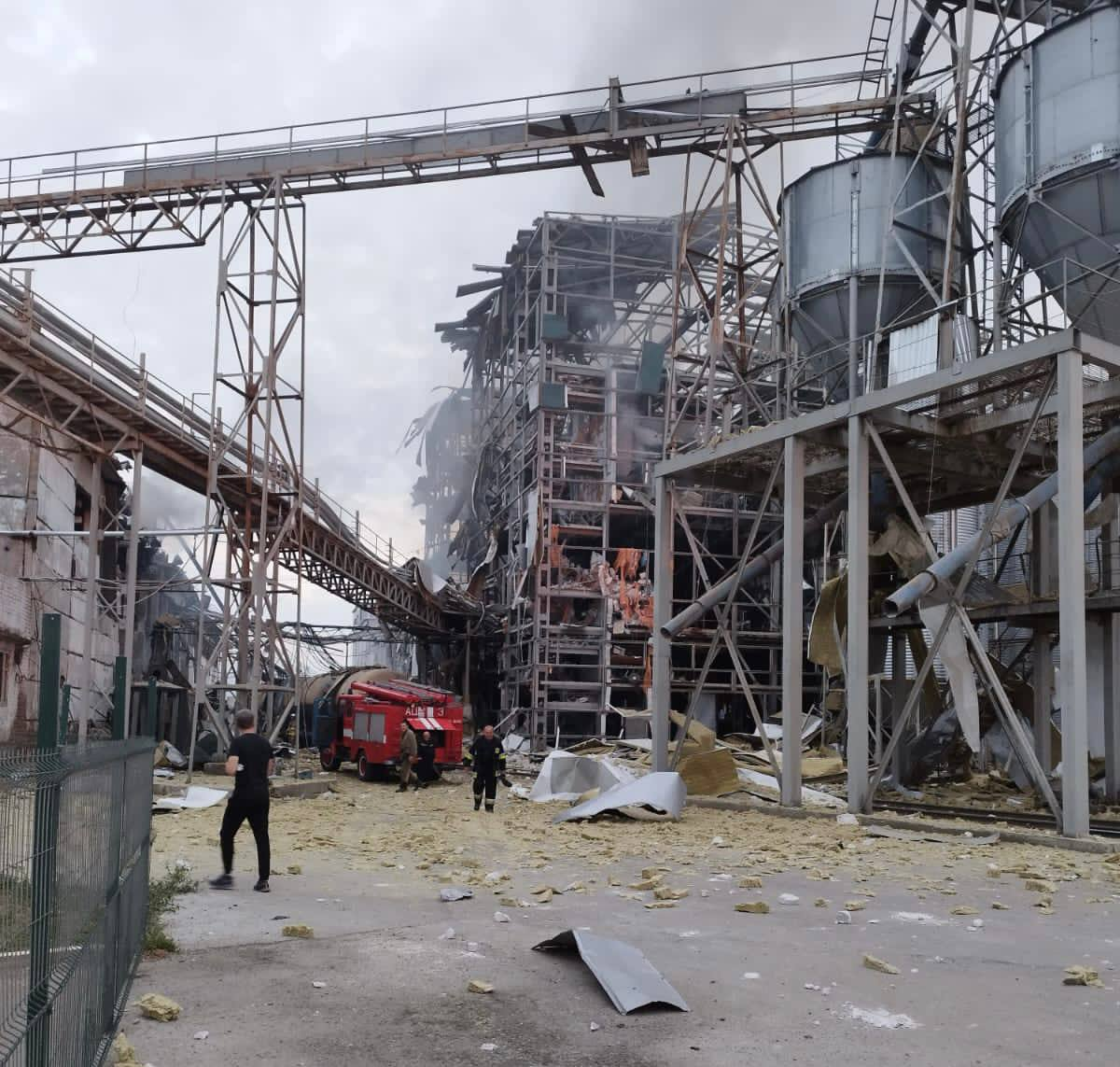
Damaged oil mill in Hoholeve, Poltava Oblast

Russia launched an overnight missile strike on an industrial facility in Hoholeve, Poltava Oblast, killing four and injuring five others. Attacks were also reported in Kryvyi Rih, where eight structures were reportedly destroyed or damaged. The Ukrainian Air Force claimed to have shot down four of six missiles launched. Six people were killed in separate attacks in Donetsk and Kherson Oblasts.

The Ukrainian Defence Ministry claimed that its forces had retaken Robotyne and were now advancing towards the settlements of Novoprokopivka and Ocheretuvate in the Zaporizhzhia front. It also claimed to have retaken one square kilometer of territory in the south of Bakhmut in the past week.

Russia claimed to have shot down two drones and a cruise missile over Crimea, as well as four drones over Belgorod and Bryansk Oblasts. Another drone was intercepted over Lyubertsy, Moscow Oblast.

The SBU arrested a resident of Kherson for passing military information to Russia to use in attacks.

=== 29 August ===
One person was killed by Russian shelling in Kharkiv Oblast.

The Ukrainian government ordered the mandatory evacuation of children, their parents or guardians, and people with limited disabilities from the settlements of Huliaipole, Yehorivka, Preobrazhenka, Stepnohirsk and Novopavlivka in Zaporizhzhia Oblast, citing an escalation in fighting and Russian attacks.

Russia claimed to have shot down two drones over Tula Oblast.

Ukrainian forces attacked targets in Russian-occupied Zaliznyi Port, Kherson Oblast, destroying a Predel-E radar system and a Leer-2 Electronic Warfare unit.

=== 30 August ===
Ukraine reportedly launched a massive series of drone attacks overnight on six regions in western Russia. One attack struck Pskov Airport, destroying two Ilyushin Il-76 transport aircraft and damaging two others. The raid was launched from within Russia according to Kyrylo Budanov, head of the Ukrainian GUR. Several other drones were reportedly shot down over Bryansk, Oryol, and Ryazan Oblasts, while Moscow's Vnukovo airport was closed as a precaution. Attacks were also reported in Kaluga and Moscow Oblasts, while in the evening, two more drones and a missile were reportedly shot down over Bryansk Oblast and Crimea. Ukrainian officials, who did not claim responsibility for the attacks, claimed that a fuel depot in Kaluga and a microelectronics factory in Bryansk were hit, and said that the attack on Pskov was carried out from inside Russia.

The Ukrainian military announced the death of six officers who were "carrying out missions" in the crash of two Mi-8 helicopters near Bakhmut, without giving a cause. Ukrainian media reported that the incident occurred near Kramatorsk.

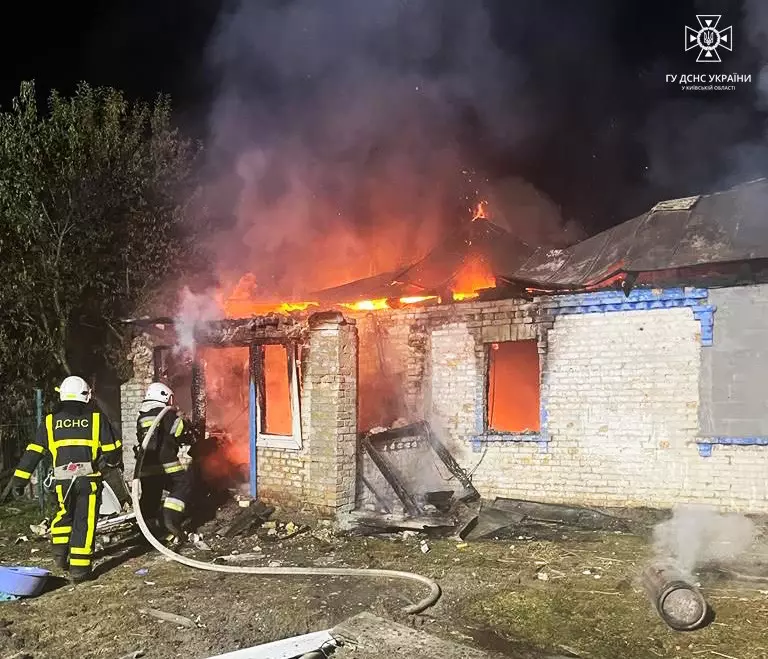
House in Kyiv region, damaged by debris during an air attack

Russia launched an overnight air attack on Ukraine, killing two people after debris fell on a commercial building in the Shevchenkivskyi district in Kyiv. Attacks were also reported in Kyiv and Zhytomyr Oblasts. The Ukrainian Air Force claimed to have shot down 43 of 44 missiles and drones launched. Three people were killed in separate attacks in Donetsk and Sumy Oblasts.

Russia claimed to have destroyed four boats carrying up to 50 members of Ukrainian special forces landing groups in the Black Sea, and intercepted a naval drone near Sevastopol Bay in Crimea.

Germany delivered 10 Leopard 1A5 tanks, a TRML-4D air surveillance radar, 16 VECTOR reconnaissance drones, four 8x8 HX81 heavy transporter trucks, along with four semi-trailers, 13 million rounds of small arms ammunition, and a field hospital as part of its latest military aid package to Ukraine.

A court in Moscow sentenced a Ukrainian national to 12 years imprisonment for allegedly plotting to detonate an explosive device in Bryansk Oblast as part of a sabotage group organized by the SBU.

Pope Francis told a crowd of Russian youths that they were heirs of "the great Russian empire", prompting condemnation from Lithuania, which summoned the Vatican's ambassador, and Ukraine. Russia called the comments "very gratifying".

The United States claimed that Russia had formally entered into a bilateral agreement with North Korea to supply the Russian military with artillery ammunition.

Russia changed the serial numbers system that indicated the time of production of its missiles in an attempt to prevent Ukrainian intelligence from counting the number of missiles in Russian stockpiles.

=== 31 August ===
President Zelenskyy announced an investigation into Ukrainians who have avoided conscription by medical exemptions, citing cases of $3,000-$15,000 being paid as bribes for exemptions. The Ukrainian Defence Ministry subsequently amended the criteria for medical exemptions, reclassifying people with clinically cured tuberculosis, viral hepatitis, slowly progressing blood diseases, thyroid gland diseases with minor functional disorders, and HIV to be fit for military service. Zelenskyy also announced that the country had developed a new weapon that could hit targets as far as 700 kilometers away.

Two people were killed by Russian shelling in Donetsk and Zaporizhzhia Oblasts, while three others were injured in a missile attack on Vinnytsia Oblast.

Russia claimed to have shot down a drone over Moscow Oblast and three others over Bryansk.

Russia opened early voting for local elections in areas it occupied in Donetsk and Zaporizhzhia Oblasts set for 10 September.

== See also ==
- Timeline of the Russian invasion of Ukraine (1 September 2023–present)
- 2023 in Ukraine
- 2023 Ukrainian counteroffensive
- Outline of the Russo-Ukrainian War
- Bibliography of Ukrainian history
