= Systema Engineering =

- Industry: Airsoft guns
- Headquarters: Japan
- Products: airsoft training weapons, airsoft parts
- Website: http://www.systema-engineering.com

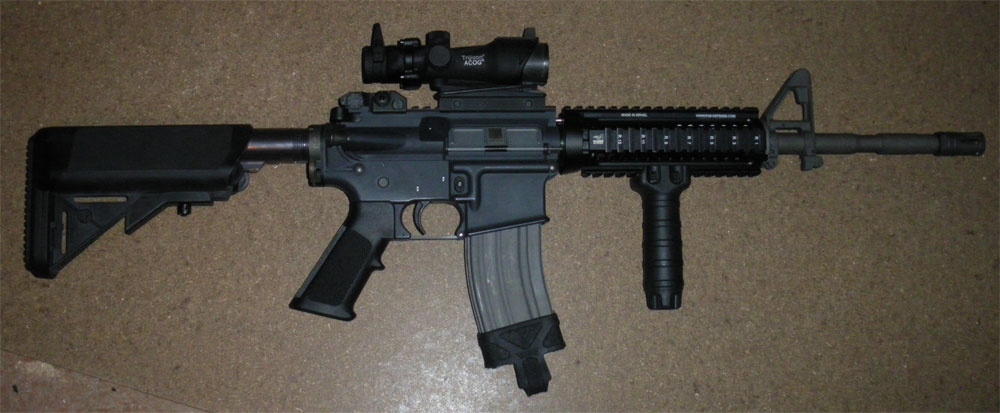
Systema Professional Training Weapon System M4A1 MAX

Systema Engineering is a Japanese manufacturer specializing in airsoft products, including internal components and airsoft gun replicas of real firearms. Their products are widely used for military and law enforcement training, as well as by airsoft enthusiasts, due to their reliability, realism, and advanced features.

== Overview ==
Systema Engineering is best known for its Professional Training Weapons (PTW) line, which represents the pinnacle of electric airsoft technology. PTWs are designed to closely mimic real firearms in function, dimensions, and handling, making them ideal for realistic training scenarios. The company’s products are used as safe, low-cost substitutes for live-fire exercises while maintaining an authentic user experience.

== Products ==
Systema produces a range of airsoft replicas based on real-world firearms, including:

M4/M16 Series

- M16A1, M16A2, M16A3, M16A3 Burst, M16A4
- M4A1, M4A1 CQBR, M4 Burst, M733 Limited Edition

Other Replicas

- PTW5A4 (Based on the HK MP5A4 submachine gun)
- PTW89 (Based on the Howa Type 89, a standard-issue rifle of the Japan Self-Defense Forces)

== See also ==
- Jing Gong
