= Jing Gong =

Hong Kong airsoft gun manufacturer

Jing Gong (Formerly Golden Bow)
- Company type: Subsidiary
- Founded: 1986
- Headquarters: Tsuen Wan, Hongkong
- Products: Airsoft guns and rail transport modelling

Jing Gong, also known as JG or GB (Golden Bow) (Chinese: 金弓), is a Hong Kong–based airsoft manufacturer. JG is the OEM of several Echo 1 guns and was also OEM for J.G.Works.

== Guns ==
Jing Gong manufactures low to mid-priced airsoft guns.

In 2008, Jing Gong released new AEGs that shoot well over 350 ft/s (110 m/s) with factory stock internals. Their lineup of AEGs are based on "clone" designs of higher-end brands, many taken from Tokyo Marui. Jing Gong makes many affordable yet high-performing AEGs. The company's range of AEGs include AR-15 rifles, MP5 submachine guns, G36 rifles, G3 rifles, AK rifles, AUG rifles and the company's best selling model, the FN P90.

In addition to AEGs, JG has released their first gas blowback, a Glock 18C, which is a clone of the KSC Glock 18C. This has, however, been disputed, as it is speculated that production of the G18c was outsourced to another Chinese airsoft manufacture. This has also been the case with their plastic-bodied M4 GBB model.

On December 14, 2011, Jing Gong announced a new line of M4/M16 styled products. This announcement was followed shortly by an announcement regarding counterfeit JG products.

== See also ==
- Airsoft pellets
