= Marui Big Bear Datsun =

The Marui Big Bear Datsun (MT-59-RC-4) was an early 1/12-scale electric "monster truck" radio controlled car manufactured and distributed by Japanese hobby and airsoft gun manufacturer Tokyo Marui.

== Background ==
Originally sold only through mail order in 1984 as a kit without batteries, radio and charger, the Big Bear featured a plastic, tub-styled chassis, Mabuchi M480-RS motor, mechanical speed control and live axle rear suspension as opposed to an independent setup. Tires were wide, chevron-treaded implement-styled units and actually comprised the majority of the Big Bear's suspension. The shock absorbers were simple coilover units which allowed for limited suspension travel. Coil springs also served to hold the front bumper in place and absorb impact. The body was a highly detailed styrene plastic Datsun pickup with driver figure and "Big Bear" decal set.

Because of its low cost, ease of assembly and good factory and aftermarket support, the Big Bear played an important role in the early growth of the radio control hobby. Due to intense competition from Tamiya and somewhat brittle plastic, Tokyo Marui pulled completely out of the hobby market by the end of the decade.

The 'Big Bear' was sold in Australia as a complete kit, including radio transmitter, batteries, and charger.

== Kit Revisions ==
Owners of the original version (v.1) of the Big Bear experienced problems with its differential gears. This kit used the same gearboxes and gears as the Marui Jeep CJ (MT-59-RC-7) and the Marui Toyota Landcruiser (MT-59-RC-8) kits and consisted of 2 large bevel gears, and a gear set of 48 pitch metric. This proved to be a major problem for the first version of the Big Bear, as the special black M480RS motor and the large tires designed for the Big Bear created increased load, causing the differential gears to break or heat up and melt.

Marui made a special replacement part "#048 - Strengthened Differential Gear Set" that consisted of a tri-bevel differential, larger 32 pitch gears, and a change to the gear ratios. This new differential gear set found its way into the re-release of the Big Bear (v.2) coupled with a new heat sink plate between the gearbox halves. There were some draw backs to the new gears; The added torque of the new gear ratios made the truck do wheelies more easily, and made the truck a little slower. In addition to replacement gears and heat sink, Marui replaced the original M480-RS motor with an RS540-SH motor, and a redesigned mechanical speed controller with covered contacts to eliminate contamination.

== Specifications ==
- Scale: 1/12
- Chassis construction: ABS resin tub-style
- Transmission: Rear wheel drive with differential
- Suspension: Independent front trailing arm and live axle rear suspension
- Shock absorbers: Simple coilover
- Motor: Mabuchi RS-540 (v.1) / RS-540SH (v.2)
- Tires: Semi-pneumatic rubber chevron
- Original Marui catalog number: MT-59-RC-4

== Spare Parts List ==
The following Marui RC Parts were used for the Big Bear, as well as other Marui kits:

Part #	Description
#007	GEAR & MOTOR CASE
#010	OILLESS BEARING SET
#014	CONTROLLER SET (the original speed controller for v.1)
#016	CONNECTOR SET
#021	SERVO SAVER SET
#028	DIFFERENTIAL GEAR SET (the original gear set for v.1)
#029	PINION SEAR SET
#030	FRONT ARM SET
#031	REAR ARM SET
#032	REAR AXLE SET
#033	BUSHING SET
#035	FRONT TIRE & WHEEL SET
#036	REAR TIRE & WHEEL SET
#037	BUMPER SET
#038	ADJUSTER
#047	CONTROLLER SET (the new and improved speed controller for v.1)
#048	STRENGTHENED DIFFERENTIAL GEAR SET (the new and improved gear set for v.2)
M060	CHASSIS
M096	WINDSHIELD-BB
M097	ROLL BAR
M098	SEAT-BB
M099	BODY-BB
M132	IDLER GEAR
M133	BODY MOUNT

== Aftermarket Parts ==
Many supporting manufacturers developed products for the Big Bear. Here is a list of known aftermarket parts designed specifically for this kit:

Manufacturer	Part #	Description
BO-LINK		BODY MOUNTING KIT
BO-LINK		FORD VAN BODY FOR BIG BEAR
BRU-LINE	4202	SUPER SYSTEM REAR HUB - BIG BEAR
BRU-LINE	5278	BIG BEAR BODY MOUNTING KIT
IMEX		DAWG TIRES FOR BIG BEAR
MOORE'S IDEAL PRODUCTS (MIP)		BBG HEAVY DUTY GEAR SET FOR BIG BEAR
MOORE'S IDEAL PRODUCTS (MIP)		BIG BEAR BALL DIFFERENTIAL GEAR
MOORE'S IDEAL PRODUCTS (MIP)		CASE SAVER
MOORE'S IDEAL PRODUCTS (MIP)		IDLER SHAFT
MOORE'S IDEAL PRODUCTS (MIP)		TEFLON AXLE BUSHINGS
PRO-LINE	2512	CHROME HUBS (FRONT)
PRO-LINE	2513	CHROME HUBS (REAR)
RACE MASTER	701	BIG BEAR WHEELIE BAR
