= Tokyo Marui =

Japanese manufacturing company

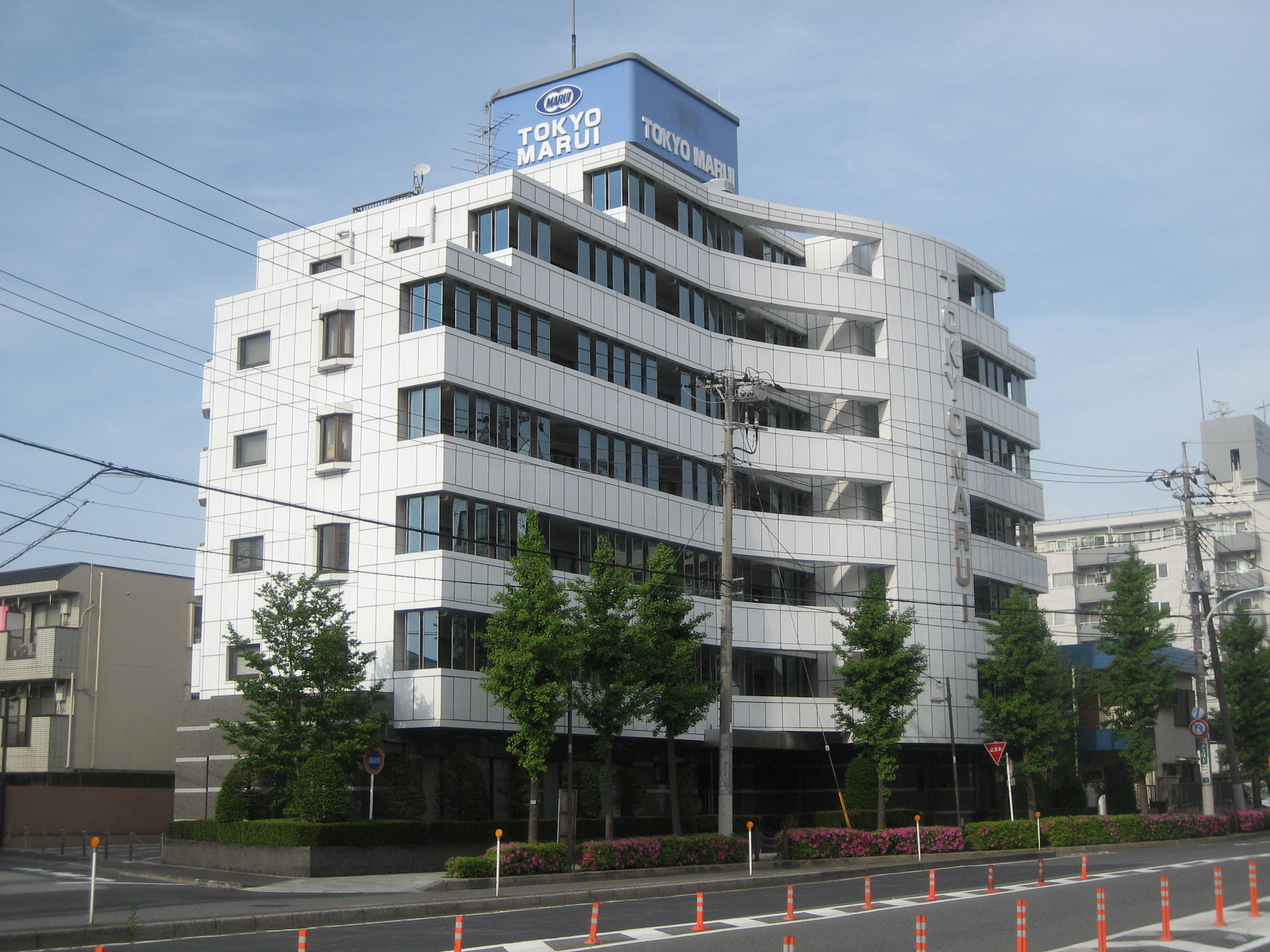
- Tokyo Marui head office located in Adachi-ku, Tokyo
- Type: Private
- Founded: 1965
- Headquarters: Adachi, Tokyo, Japan
- Products: Airsoft guns and rail transport modelling
- Website: www.tokyo-marui.co.jp

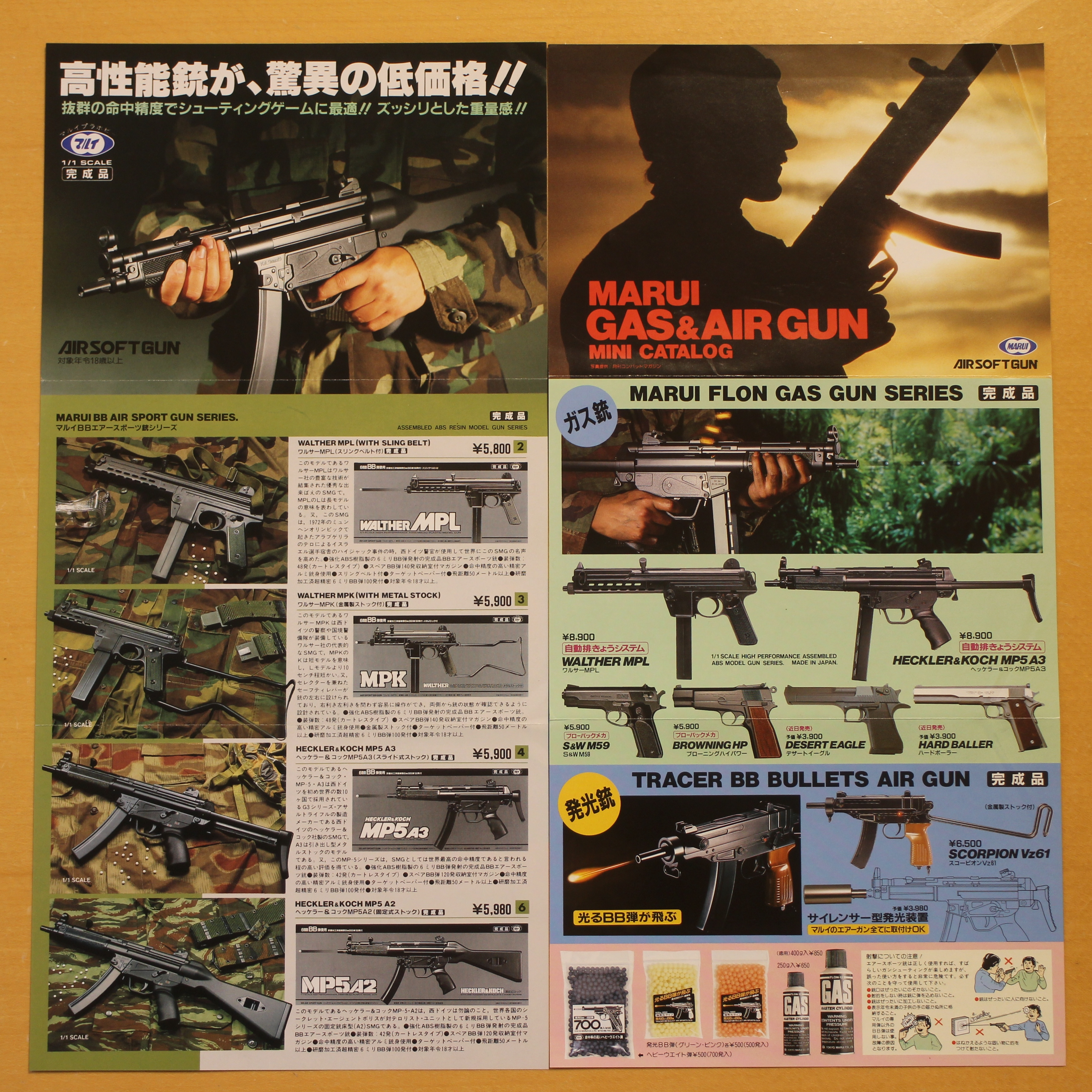
Early Tokyo Marui airsoft lineup

Tokyo Marui Co. Ltd (株式会社東京マルイ, Kabushiki-gaisha Tōkyō Marui) is a Japanese toy company located in Adachi, Tokyo, famous for manufacturing toy cars and pioneering the design of battery-powered airsoft guns. Their products are principally sold in Japan, but are also exported worldwide.

The company had its own center for airsoft sport called Tokyo Marui BB Sports Field which was operated during 2009 and 2010. Their guns have appeared in numerous movies and it has merchandising arrangements with many games.

== Automatic electric guns ==
Tokyo Marui was the first company to introduce airsoft guns powered solely by electric motor gearbox-driven spring-piston assembly in 1992, which they called "automatic electric gun" (AEG). This compact air pump system was implemented in their first battery-powered automatic firing replica, the FAMAS F1. Other airsoft guns were then introduced. The 3-gear AEG design developed by Tokyo Marui is still in use today, and has been copied numerous times through the years by many other airsoft manufacturers.

Tokyo Marui's airsoft replicas were made primarily from ABS plastic bodies, but also used metal parts where needed. Their more recent models, such as the Type 89 and AK-74M rifles have had full metal externals. The internal gearboxes of these guns are primarily powered by rechargeable batteries. A standard, unmodified Tokyo Marui gearbox will fire 0.20 g airsoft pellets at 240 to 300 feet per second (73 to 91 m/s) — around 0.8 to 0.9 joules (0.59 to 0.66 ft⋅lb) of muzzle energy – depending on the model. These gearboxes may be modified for higher performance with aftermarket parts, but Japanese law limits their power output to 0.98 joules (0.72 ft⋅lb).

Tokyo Marui makes the following AEGs:

- M14 series
  - M14 SOCOM
  - M14 (fiber-type stock)
  - M14 (wood-type stock)
- M16 & M4 series
  - Colt M16A1
  - Colt M16A1 Vietnam version
  - Colt M16A2
  - Colt M16 Golgo 13 (Limited edition)
  - Colt M733 Commando
  - Colt M4A1 R.I.S.
  - Colt M4A1 carbine New-type
  - Colt M4 SOPMOD (Electric Blow Back)
  - Colt M4 S-System
  - Colt M4 P.M.C
  - Colt M4A1 SOCOM Carbine (Electric Blow Back)
  - Colt M4 CQB-R Black (Electric Blow Back)
  - Colt M4 CQB-R Dark earth (Electric Blow Back)
  - H&K 416 (Electric Blow Back)
  - H&K 416 DEVGRU Custom (Electric Blow Back)
  - H&K 416 Delta Custom (Electric Blow Back)
  - H&K 416C (Electric Blow Back)
  - H&K 416D (Electric Blow Back)
  - Knight's M4 SR-16
  - Colt M4A1
  - Colt M993 Tan (limited edition)
  - Colt XM177E2 (discontinued)
  - Colt CAR-15 (discontinued)
  - Colt M653 Barnes version (limited edition)
  - RECCE Rifle (Electric Blow Back)
- MP5 and G36 series
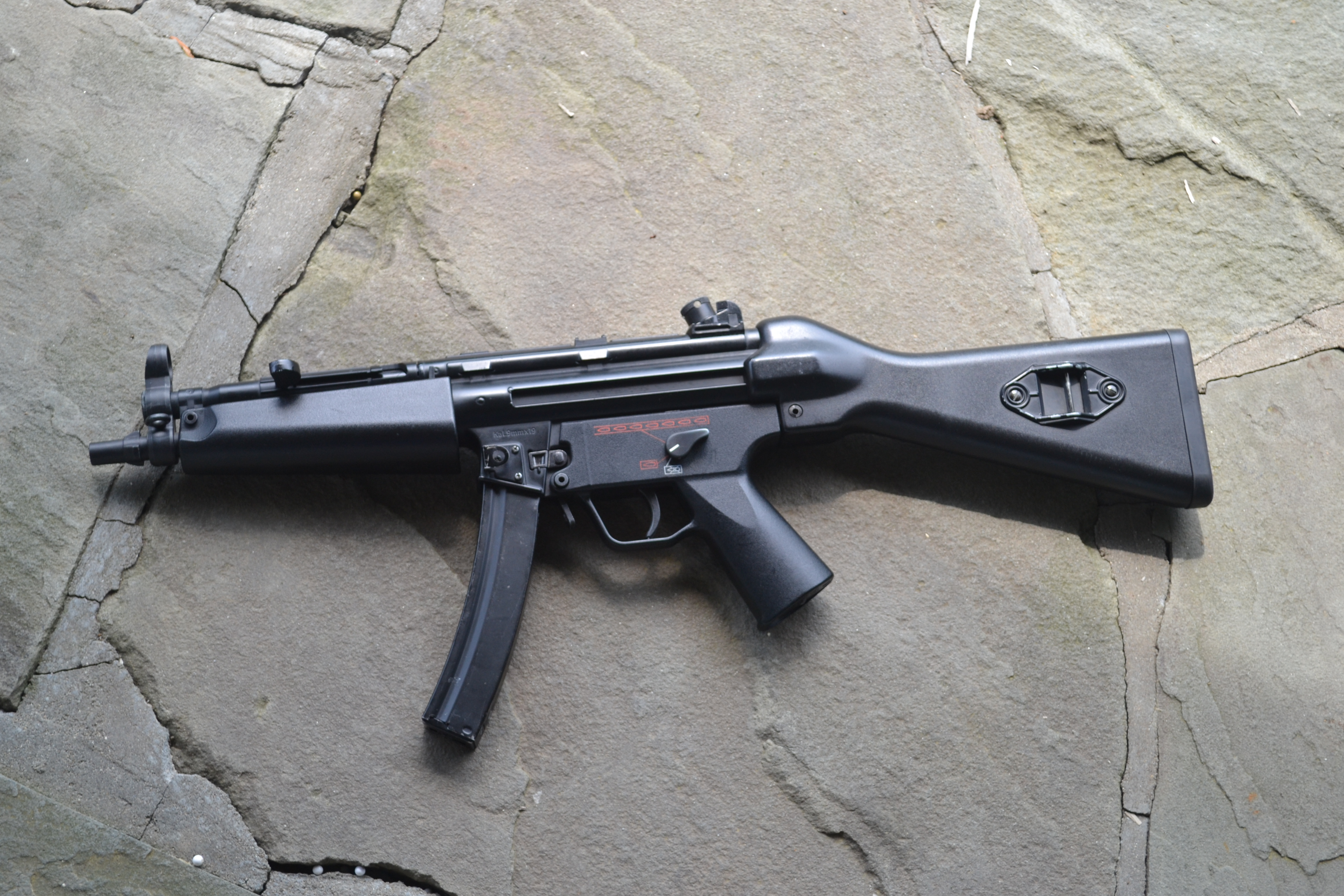
  A Tokyo Marui MP5A4 AEG
  - H&K G36C
  - H&K G36K (Electric Blow-Back)
  - H&K MP5A5 High-Cycle
  - MP5-J
  - MP5-K
  - MP5-K High Cycle
  - MP5-K PDW
  - H&K MP5SD5
  - H&K MP5SD6
  - H&K MP5KA4 PDW
  - H&K MP5A4 High Grade
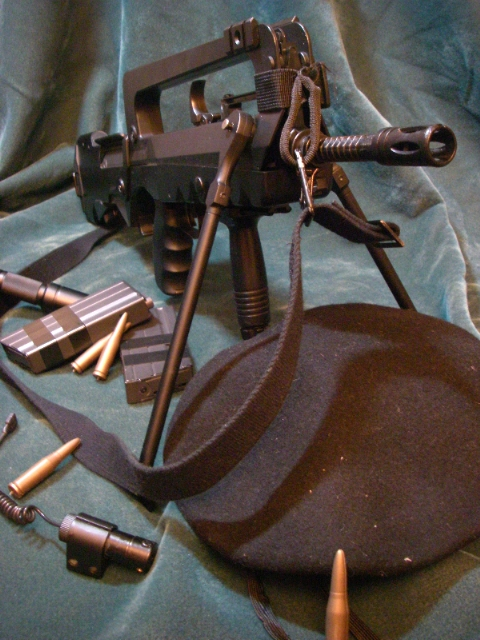
    The FAMAS F1 was Tokyo Marui's first AEG.
  - H&K MP5A5 High Grade
  - H&K MP5 R.A.S.
  - H&K MP5KA4
  - H&K MP5 Navy (Limited Edition)
- P90 series
  - P90
  - P90 Triple Rail
  - PS90 High-Cycle
- FAMAS & Steyr series
  - Steyr AUG Special Receiver
  - Steyr AUG Military-type (discontinued)
  - Steyr AUG High-Cycle
  - FA-MAS Special Version (Discontinued)
  - FA-MAS 5.56-F1 (First AEG ever made) (Discontinued)
- SIG series
  - SIG SG 550 (discontinued, due to burst fire microchip malfunctions)
  - SIG SG 551 (discontinued, due to burst fire microchip malfunctions)
  - SIG SG 552-2 SEALS

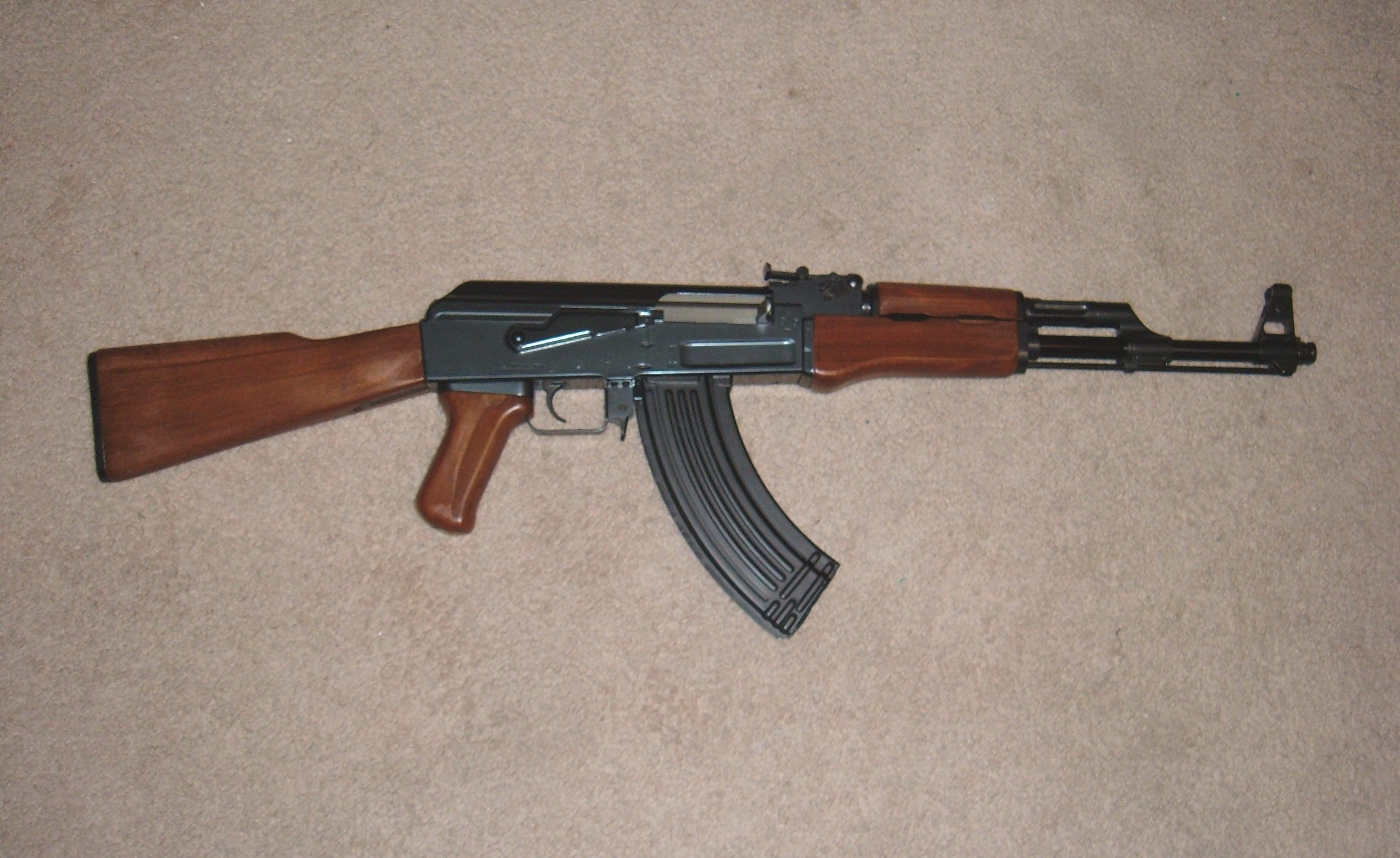
Tokyo Marui airsoft AK-47 AEG

- AK series
  - AK-47
  - AK-47S
  - AK-47 Spetsnaz (limited edition)
  - AK-47 Beta Spetsnaz
  - AK-47 High-Cycle
  - AK-74MN (Electric Blow Back)
  - AKS-74U (Electric Blow Back)
  - AK-102 (Electric Blow Back)

AK-47 Type 3 (Electric Blow Back)

- G3 series
  - H&K G3A3 (discontinued)
  - H&K G3A4 (discontinued)
  - H&K MC51
  - H&K G3 SAS
  - H&K G3 SAS High-Cycle
  - H&K PSG-1
  - H&K G3/SG1
  - HK51 (limited edition)
- Howa Type 89 series
  - Howa Type 89 (the government-issued supplies model for Japanese army as JGSDF; it is used by soldiers when training for CQB)
  - Howa Type 89 (the hobby model for private citizens)
  - Howa Type 89-F (AEG based on folding stock variant of standard Type 89 rifle for airborne/special forces, both civilian hobby and JSDF training models available)
- Other
  - Heckler & Koch MP7A1
  - Uzi submachine gun (Discontinued)
  - Thompson M1A1
  - FN SCAR H
  - FN SCAR L
- Automatic Electric Shotguns
  - AA-12
  - SGR-12
  - "Thor's Hammer" (Longer SGR-12)

== Automatic electric pistols ==
Automatic electric pistols (AEP) run on 7.2V rechargeable batteries. These pistols and compact submachine guns are often more reliable than gas-powered replicas in cold weather. However, due to their lower voltage supplies and miniature gearboxes, they usually generate lower muzzle speeds (about 0.25 - .5J per BB, 25–50 m/s for 0.2g BB) and slightly slower rates of fire than replicas using a full-sized gearbox system.

Tokyo Marui makes the following automatic electric pistols:

- H&K USP
- M93R
- Glock 18C
- MP7A1
- Škorpion vz. 61
- Beretta M9A1
- Ruger KP85
- Steyr Mannlicher TMP (cancelled)
- MAC-10
- MAC-11
- H&K P30
- Škorpion vz. 61

== AEG Boys series ==
Tokyo Marui makes LPAEG replicas scaled down for use by children from the age of 10. They are powered by 6 AA batteries and have lower power than their 1:1 scale counterparts.

- H&K MP5A5
- Colt M4A1 carbine
- H&K G36C
- Colt M4 SOPMOD
- AK-47

== Electric blowback pistols ==
Tokyo Marui's electric blowback pistols (commonly referred to as EBBs) are powered by four AAA batteries and typically fire at 160 ft/s (49 m/s) with a 0.12 gram BB. Some models may be select fire, and most models have an additional grip safety that must be held in order for the pistol to fire, with the exception of the Combat Delta models that use the gun's usual grip safety. The pistols feature a very weak blowback, and the slide usually only moves a third of the distance that it would on a typical GBB or real firearm.

- SIG Pro SP2340
- Combat Delta (Colt Delta Elite 10mm)
- Combat Delta Silver Model
- M92F Military
- M92F Silver Model
- Desert Eagle .50AE
- Desert Eagle .50AE Silver
- KP85
- Centimeter Master
- Glock 18C
- H&K P30
- Ingram MAC-11 (New)
- Beretta M9A1
- Beretta M9A1 Silver

== Gas blowback pistols ==
Tokyo Marui Gas blowback pistols are designed to use HFC134A refrigerant to fire BBs and also to blow back the slide, mimicking the recoil of automatic hand guns. Refrigerant is sold in canisters similar to small propane canisters used in portable gas range. Propane based "Green" gas can be used, but could damage the replica due to higher pressure it exerts to mostly plastic parts used in gas blowback replicas, but many replicas have proven safe to use with propane or green gas.

Desert Eagle Series:

- Desert Eagle .50AE Non-Hard-Kick
- Desert Eagle .50AE Hard-Kick
- Desert Eagle .50AE 10"
- Desert Eagle .50AE Chrome Stainless
- Desert Eagle .50AE Biohazard 2 (1998 Limited Edition)
- Desert Eagle .50AE Biohazard 2 10" Custom Ver. 98' Two-Tone (Limited Edition)
- Desert Eagle .50AE Biohazard 2 10" Custom Ver. 2007 Chrome (Limited Edition)
- Desert Eagle .50AE Hard-Kick Full Metal (Limited Edition)

Detonics .45 Series:

- Detonics .45 Combat Master
- Detonics .45 Combat Master Enviro Hard Chrome
- Detonics .45 Combat Master Chrome Frame
- Detonics .45 Combat Master Chrome Slide

Glock Series:

- Glock 17
- Glock 17 Custom Dark Earth
- Glock 17 Custom Foliage Green
- Glock 18c
- Glock 19
- Glock 22
- Glock 26
- Glock 26 Advance (Tokyo Marui custom)
- Glock 34

Hi-Capa/ M1911 Series:

- Hi-Capa 4.3 (Tokyo Marui custom)
- Hi-Capa 4.3 Dual Stainless Custom (Tokyo Marui custom)
- Hi-Capa 5.1 (Tokyo Marui custom)
- Hi-Capa 5.1 Stainless (Tokyo Marui custom)
- Hi-Capa 5.1 R-Series Silver (Tokyo Marui custom)
- Hi-Capa 5.1 R-Series Black (Tokyo Marui custom)
- Hi-Capa 5.1 Match Custom (Tokyo Marui custom)
- Hi-Capa D.O.R
- Hi-Capa Xtreme .45 (Fully Automatic) (Tokyo Marui custom)
- M.E.U (Marine Expeditionary Unit)
- M1911A1 Colt Government
- Desert Warrior 4.3 (Tokyo Marui custom)
- Foliage Warrior 4.3 (Tokyo Marui custom)
- Night Warrior (Tokyo Marui custom)
- Strike Warrior (Tokyo Marui custom)
- 1911 Series 70
- 1911 Series 70 Nickel Plated version
- M45A1 CQB

Beretta M92 Series:

- M9 Tactical Master (Tokyo Marui custom)
- M9
- M92F Chrome Stainless
- M92F Military Model
- M92F Duo-Tone (Black slide with silver frame)
- M92F Duo-Tone (Black frame with silver slide)
- M92F Biohazard Samurai Edge Standard Model
- M92F Biohazard Samurai Edge Jill Model 1999-2000 (Limited Edition)
- M92F Biohazard Samurai Edge Chris Model 2000 (Limited Edition)
- M92F Biohazard Samurai Edge Barry Model C/S.E-03 2001 (Limited Edition)
- M9A1
- M9A1 silver version

SIG Sauer Series:

- SIG Sauer P226
- SIG Sauer P226 Stainless
- SIG Sauer P226 Silver Frame
- SIG Sauer P226 Silver Slide
- SIG Sauer P226E2

Others:

- FN Five-Seven
- Beretta PX4 Storm
- Springfield XDM .40
- Heckler & Koch USP Compact
- Heckler & Koch USP
- HK45 Tactical
- S&W M&P9
- S&W 4506 (Discontinued)
- Browning Hi-Power (Discontinued)

== Fixed slide gas pistols ==
Also known as "Non-Blowback" pistols.

- AMT Hardballer
- Centimeter Master
- Desert Eagle
- Mk23 SOCOM (High grade, Movable slide)
- Steyr M-GB (Movable slide)
- Wilson Super Grade

== Gas revolvers ==
- Colt Python 2.5-inch (64 mm)
- Colt Python 2.5-inch (64 mm) Chrome Stainless
- Colt Python 4-inch (100 mm)
- Colt Python 4-inch (100 mm) Chrome Stainless
- Colt Python 6-inch (150 mm)
- Colt Python 6-inch (150 mm) Chrome Stainless
- M19 Combat Magnum 2.5-inch (64 mm) (Relaunched)
- M19 Combat Magnum 4-inch (100 mm) (Relaunched)
- M19 Combat Magnum 6-inch (150 mm) (Relaunched)
- Smith & Wesson M66 2.5-inch (64 mm)
- Smith & Wesson M66 4-inch (100 mm)
- Smith & Wesson M66 6-inch (150 mm)

== Gas Blowback Machine Guns ==
Recently, Tokyo Marui has delved into the world of Gas Blowback Machine Guns. These replicas work very similarly to Tokyo Marui's Gas Blowback Pistols, in that they use HFC134A refrigerant to blowback the bolt assembly to mimic the recoil of an automatic rifle or sub-machine gun when shooting the BBs.

Tokyo Marui has made gas powered replicas of these machine guns:

- Heckler & Koch MP7|MP7A1
- Colt M4A1 MWS (Released in 2015)
- MTR16
- Howa Type 89 (released in 2017)
- Walther MPL (Discontinued shell-ejecting gas blowback sub-machine gun.)
- Heckler & Koch MP5A3 (Discontinued shell-ejecting gas blowback sub-machine gun.)

== Bolt action air rifles ==
These are bolt-action "sniper" rifles. Before each shot is fired, the shooter has to pull the bolt, cock the piston and load a BB into the chamber. All three versions of the VSR-10 share the same stock, same internals and same air chamber. The Pro-sniper version has a black stock, 430 mm long inner barrel and is the most accurate of the three versions. The Real Shock version has a metal weight in the piston to simulate recoil. Real Shock has a simulated wooden stock and the same 430 mm long inner barrel. However, due to the vibration caused by the heavier piston's impact, Real Shock is the least accurate of the three, albeit only by less than an inch difference at 20 m distance. G-spec is shortened version with a silencer attached. Inner barrel is 303 mm long, but has a slightly tighter bore. Due to short inner barrel its accuracy is close to Real Shock, but a couple mm more accurate. A needle-like contraption called air brake protrudes from the piston. The air brake plugs the cylinder before piston impacts, trapping a small amount of air between the piston and cylinder. This reduces impact vibration and adds to VSR series' unique accuracy.

- VSR-10 Pro-sniper version
- VSR-10 Pro-sniper version Tan
- VSR-10 Pro-hunter version
- VSR-10 Pro-hunter version Black
- VSR-10 Real Stock Version Wood
- VSR-10 G-Spec
- VSR-10 G-Spec OD
- L96 AWS Black
- L96 AWS OD
- M40A5 Black
- M40A5 OD

== Air shotgun and air rifles ==
Tokyo Marui makes several replicas that are powered by compressing a spring. For the shotgun and grenade launcher models, each shot fires three BBs at a time.

- M3 Super 90
- M3 Shorty
- SPAS-12
- SPAS-12 (Discontinued) Metal Stock version
- M203 grenade launcher for M16A1 and M16A2
- M203 grenade launcher for M4A1, M4A1 RIS, and Knight's SR-16
- Tactical launcher, an M203 with stock and pistol grip for standalone use
- XM177E2
- M16A1
- MP5A3
- Uzi SMG
- Heckler & Koch G3A3
- Walther MPL (Discontinued)
- Kel-Tec KSG
- Walther MPK (Discontinued)

== Spring Pistols ==
The spring is compressed by racking the slide. Some have hop-up and some do not.

- HP Browning Competition (Discontinued)
- Nambu Type 14 (Discontinued)
- Walther P38
- (AMC) .44 Auto Mag
- (Springfield Armory) Omega 10mm Auto
- Colt M1911A1 Government
- (Smith & Wesson) M645
- Desert Eagle (.44)
- SIG P228 High Grade
- Glock 17L High Grade
- Glock 17 High Grade
- (Ruger) KP85 High Grade
- H&K P7M13
- (AMT/IAI) Auto Mag III High Grade
- S&W PC356
- (Beretta) M8000 Cougar G
- (Colt Mk IV Series 80) Centimeter Master
- (H&K) SOCOM Mk 23 High Grade (Named one of the best spring pistols ever made.)
- H&K USP High Grade
- CZ 75 High Grade
- Colt Double Eagle
- (Beretta) M92F Military Model High Grade
- Biohazard Ashford Luger Model (Limited Edition)
- AMT Hardballer
- Browning Hi-Power Competition (Discontinued)
- Colt Python (Black or Silver)
- P08 Luger (Discontinued)
- Colt Single Action Army (Black or Silver)

== Gindan Pistols ==
Tokyo Marui makes a small series of semi-automatic guns that fire by compressing the spring and releasing it as the trigger is pulled. These are mostly marketed at children in various colors, but Tokyo Marui has released black and silver editions which come in more professional looking boxes. The barrels create a short range hop-up effect. Tokyo Marui only recommends that a special .12 g silver projectile of theirs be used, and that it be loaded with a proprietary speedloader which holds 90 projectiles.

- Glock 26
- Walther PPK

== Radio controlled models ==
Tokyo Marui was also at the forefront of the developing radio control hobby in the mid-1980s with a line of high-quality 1/10-scale electric buggies, monster trucks and even an unusual NASCAR Winston Cup stocker, all in kit form. This kit of Bill Elliott's Coors Melling Ford Thunderbird was built on a four-wheel drive buggy chassis; despite that full-scale NASCAR racers are rear-wheel drive. The body could be raised or lowered for either onroad or offroad use and two full sets of wheels and tires were included, pre-mounted sponge slick tires for onroad and knobby spiked rubber tires for offroad. The Big Bear Datsun, a 1/12-scale monster truck topped with a Datsun pickup truck body, powered by a Mabuchi RS-380 motor and initially sold via mail order, was one of the best-selling radio controlled models of the period and contributed greatly to the hobby's growth.

Scale variations on the simple and strong Big Bear chassis included both regular and "Super Wheelie" versions of the Jeep CJ-7 Golden Eagle and Toyota FJ40 Land Cruiser, each lacking the oversized wheels and tires of the Big Bear and equipped instead with more scale-looking Goodyear offroad tires. A proposed third version which would have been Marui's ninth release was that of a Mitsubishi Pajero, shelved due to licensing problems. Twelve models were released in all, numbered 1 through 13 since the aforementioned ninth model never made it to market.

Strong competition by the end of the decade, especially from Tamiya and Kyosho, caused Marui to pull out of the hobby-grade R/C market. They returned to the R/C market in 2000 with a still-popular line of ready-to-run, 1/24-scale military tanks (see below).

The company released and sold the following models:

- Hunter 2WD entry-level sport buggy
- Galaxy 2WD sport/mild competition buggy
- Galaxy RS 2WD sport buggy
- Shogun 4WD sport/mild competition buggy
- Samurai 4WD competition buggy
- Ninja 4WD competition buggy
- Coors Melling Ford Thunderbird 4WD NASCAR stock car
- Big Bear Datsun 2WD sport monster truck
- CJ-7 Golden Eagle 2WD sport offroad, available in regular and "Super Wheelie"
- Toyota Land Cruiser 2WD sport offroad, available in regular and "Super Wheelie"

== Radio controlled battle tanks ==
Tokyo Marui has combined remote control and airsoft by making a series of 1/24 scale remote controlled tanks that fire BBs. By remote control, a user may move the tank forwards and backwards, turn in place, rotate the turret, elevate the barrel, and fire. The range is only 25 m for 0.2g BBs. The tanks run on eight AA batteries.

- Leopard 2 A6
- Tiger I
- Tiger I Camouflage
- M1A2 Abrams
- Type 90 Tank JGSDF 71st Regiment

== Others ==
Tokyo Marui has also in an attempt to compete with Tamiya manufactured 1:24 scale model cars, Mini 4WD of their own RC cars as well as licensed by other companies including Kyosho and educational models. The early nineties recession would force the company to scale back production to airsoft guns. Tokyo Marui has since returned to the RC car market, albeit the lucrative mini RC market with its 1:24 cars and also since 1994, builds remote driven Godzilla models. In 2007, Tokyo Marui released Z- scale model trains under the Pro-Z title including fully developed rail dioramas with several different trainsets. Recently, Tokyo Marui has entered the electric scooter market.

== See also ==
- Airsoft guns
