= Muzzle energy =

Kinetic energy of a bullet

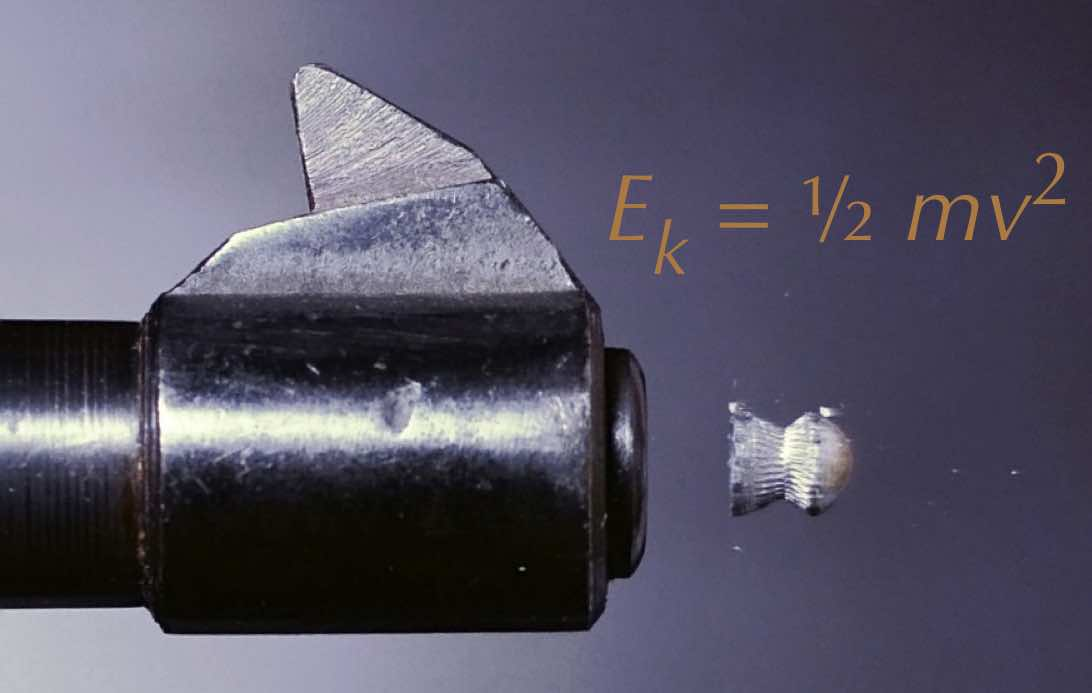
Pellet exiting muzzle, with formula for energy overlaid.

Muzzle energy is the kinetic energy of a bullet as it is expelled from the muzzle of a firearm. Without consideration of factors such as aerodynamics and gravity for the sake of comparison, muzzle energy is used as a rough indication of the destructive potential of a given firearm or cartridge. The heavier the bullet and especially the faster it moves, the higher its muzzle energy and the more damage it will do.

== Kinetic energy ==
The general formula for the kinetic energy is $E_\mathrm{k} = \frac{1}{2} mv^2,$ where v is the velocity of the bullet and m is the mass of the bullet.

Although both mass and velocity contribute to the muzzle energy, the muzzle energy is proportional to the mass while proportional to the square of the velocity. The velocity of the bullet is a more important determinant of muzzle energy. For a constant velocity, if the mass is doubled, the energy is doubled; however, for a constant mass, if the velocity is doubled, the muzzle energy increases four times. In the SI system the above E_{k} will be in unit joules if the mass, m, is in kilograms, and the speed, v, is in metres per second.

== Typical muzzle energies of common firearms and cartridges ==
Muzzle energy is dependent upon the factors previously listed, and velocity is highly variable depending upon the length of the barrel a projectile is fired from. Also the muzzle energy is only an upper limit for how much energy is transmitted to the target, and the effects of a ballistic trauma depend on several other factors as well. There is wide variation in commercial ammunition. A 180 gr (12 g) bullet fired from .357 Magnum handgun can achieve a muzzle energy of 580 ft⋅lbf (790 J). A 110 gr (7.1 g) bullet fired from the same gun might only achieve 400 ft⋅lbf (540 J) of muzzle energy, depending upon the manufacturer of the cartridge. Some .45 Colt +P ammunition can produce 1,200 ft⋅lbf (1,600 J) of muzzle energy.

== Legal requirements on muzzle energy ==
Many parts of the world use muzzle energy to classify guns into categories that require different categories of licence. In general guns that have the potential to be more dangerous have tighter controls, while those of minimal energy, such as small air pistols or air rifles, require little more than user registration, or in some countries have no restrictions at all. Overview of gun laws by nation indicates the various approaches taken. Firearms regulation in the United Kingdom is a complicated example, but is demarked by muzzle energy as well as barrel length and ammunition diameter.

Some jurisdictions also stipulate minimum muzzle energies for safe hunting. For example, in Denmark rifle ammunition used for hunting the largest types of game there such as red deer must have a kinetic energy E_{100} (i.e.: at 100 m (110 yd) range) of at least 2,700 J (2,000 ft⋅lbf) and a bullet mass of at least 9 g (140 gr) or alternatively an E_{100} of at least 2,000 J (1,500 ft⋅lbf) and a bullet mass of at least 10 g (150 gr). Namibia specifies three levels of minimum muzzle energy for hunting depending on the size of the game, 1,350 J (1,000 ft⋅lbf) for game such as springbok, 2,700 J (2,000 ft⋅lbf) for game such as hartebeest, and 5,400 J (4,000 ft⋅lbf) for Big Five game, together with a minimum caliber of 7 mm (0.28 in).

In Germany, airsoft guns with a muzzle energy of no more than 0.5 J (0.37 ft⋅lbf) are exempt from the gun law, while air guns with a muzzle energy of no more than 7.5 J (5.5 ft⋅lbf) may be acquired without a firearms license.

Mainland China uses a varied concept of "muzzle ratio kinetic energy" (Chinese: 枪口比动能), which is the quotient (ratio) of the muzzle energy divided by the bore cross sectional area, to distinguish genuine guns from "imitation" replicas like toy guns. The Ministry of Public Security unilaterally introduced the concept in 2008 leading up to the Beijing Olympic Games, dictating that anything over 1.8 J/cm^{2} to be defined as real firearms. This caused many existing toy gun products on the Chinese market (particularly airsoft) to become illegal overnight, as almost all airsoft guns shooting a standard 0.20 g (3.1 gr) 6 mm (0.24 in) pellet have a muzzle velocity over 76 m/s (250 ft/s), which translates to more than 0.58 J (0.43 ft⋅lbf) of muzzle energy, or 2.0536 J/cm^{2} of "ratio energy". For comparison a standard baseball changeup thrown at 34 m/s (110 ft/s) has 1.951 J/cm^{2} of "ratio energy" which also exceeds the 1.8 J/cm^{2} of a real firearm while a fastball can reach over 3.5 J/cm^{2} or nearly double the level of a real firearm. The subsequent crackdowns by local law enforcement led to many seizures, arrests and prosecutions of individual owners for "trafficking and possession of illegal weapons" over the years for weapons that were previously permitted.

== See also ==
- Free recoil
- Muzzle velocity
- Power factor (shooting sports)

== Resources ==
- Edward F. Obert, Thermodynamics, McGraw-Hill Book Co., 1948.
- Mc Graw-Hill encyclopedia of Science and Technology, volume ebe-eye and ice-lev, 9th Edition, Mc Graw-Hill, 2002.
