= Airsoft gun =

Special type of air gun used in airsoft

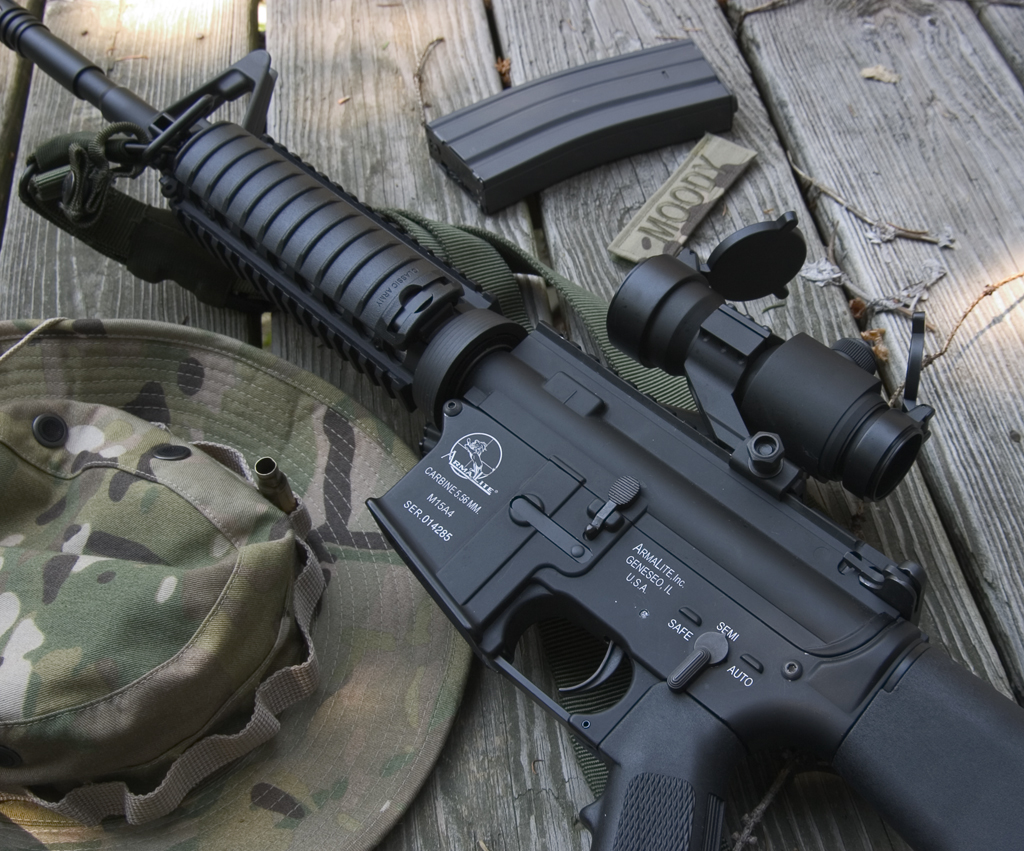
Classic Army M4 AEG with a replica Aimpoint CompM2 red dot sight

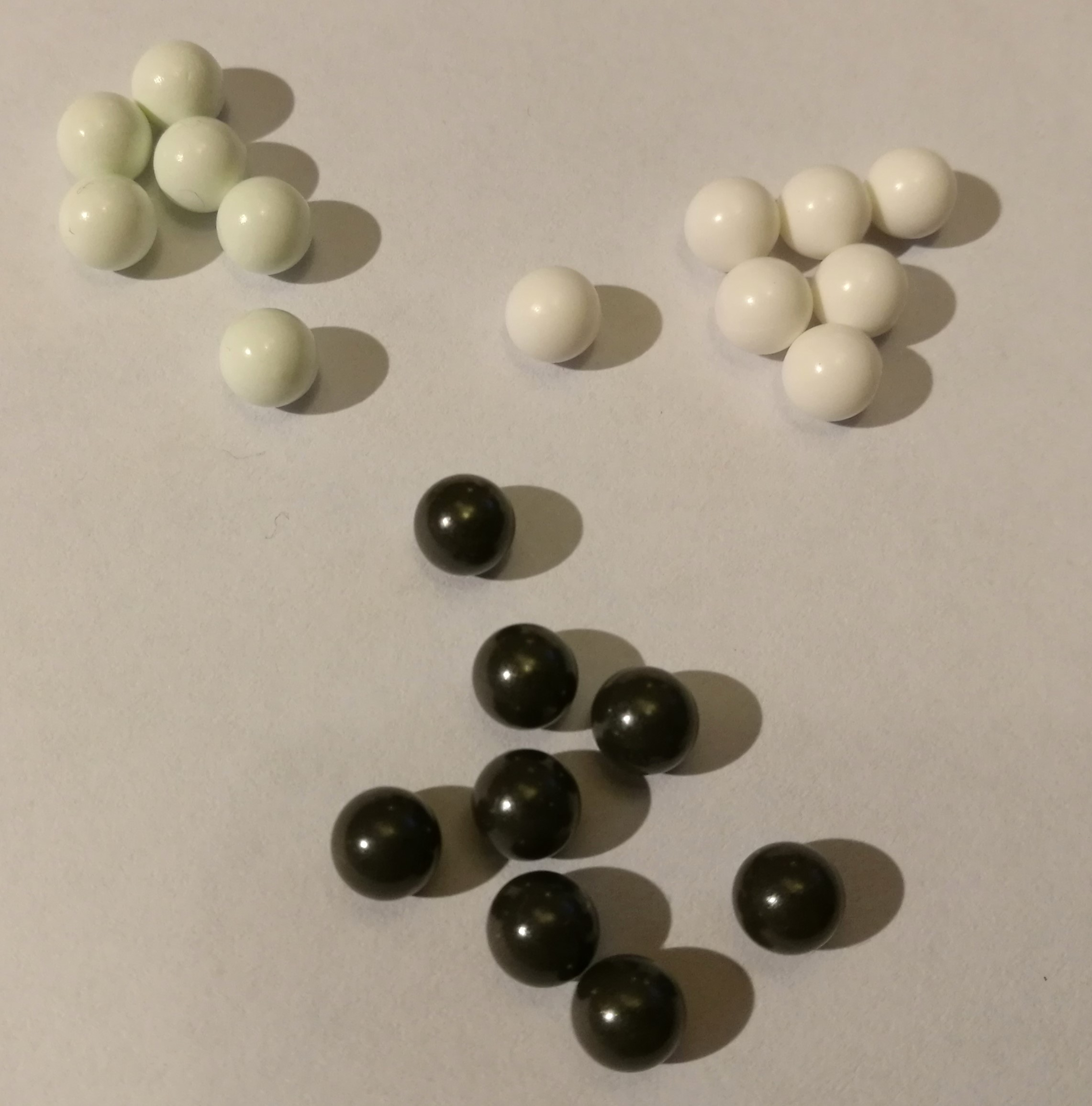
Airsoft pellets

Airsoft guns (ASG or AEG) are air guns used in airsoft sports. They are a special type of low-power smoothbore guns designed to shoot non-metallic spherical projectiles (airsoft pellets) often colloquially (but incorrectly) referred to as "BBs", which are typically made of (but not limited to) plastic or biodegradable resin materials. Airsoft gun powerplants are designed to have low muzzle energy ratings (generally between 1.0 to 2.5 joules or 0.74–1.84 ft⋅lb_{f}) and the pellet balls have significantly less effective range, penetrative and stopping power than conventional airgun pellets and shots, and these characteristics make airsoft guns generally safe as toy guns for competitive sporting and recreational purposes as long as adequate protective gear (e.g. protective eyewear, face shield, firm clothing) are worn over the more vulnerable exposed parts of the body.

Depending on the mechanism for pellet propulsion, airsoft guns fall into two broad groups just like conventional airguns. One group is spring-piston guns, which utilize elastic energy of a coil spring to propel piston air pump that is either manually cocked (i.e. "spring guns", commonly referred to as "springers", and are the simplest, cheapest and generally of low quality); or automatically cycled by a battery-powered electric motor gearbox (i.e. "automatic electric guns" or AEGs). The other group is pneumatic guns (i.e. "gas guns"), which operate by bash valve-controlled pressure release of prefilled bottled gas such as compressed propane mixed with silicone oil (commonly known as "Green Gas") or CO_{2} canisters (Powerlets.). Pneumatic guns can be cycled either manually by hand-pulling back the bolt or slide, which loads the subsequent shot; or automatically by having the released propellant gas also pushing back the action (i.e. "gas blowback guns" or GBBs).

Airsoft guns are often designed to aesthetically resemble real firearms, which provides more realism but also makes it difficult to distinguish them from actual lethal weapons. Despite some jurisdictions issuing a mandate of bright orange-colored muzzle tips for better identification, the strong aesthetic resemblance has led to incidents of police misidentifying airsoft gun handlers as active shooters with real firearms and subsequently shooting them under the probable cause and plausible deniability of thinking they thus pose a deadly threat.

== Usage ==
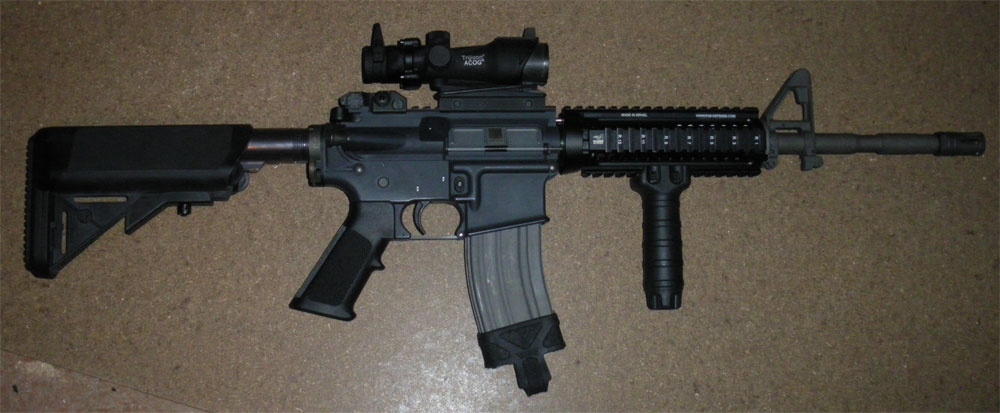
Systema Professional Training Weapon System M4A1 MAX

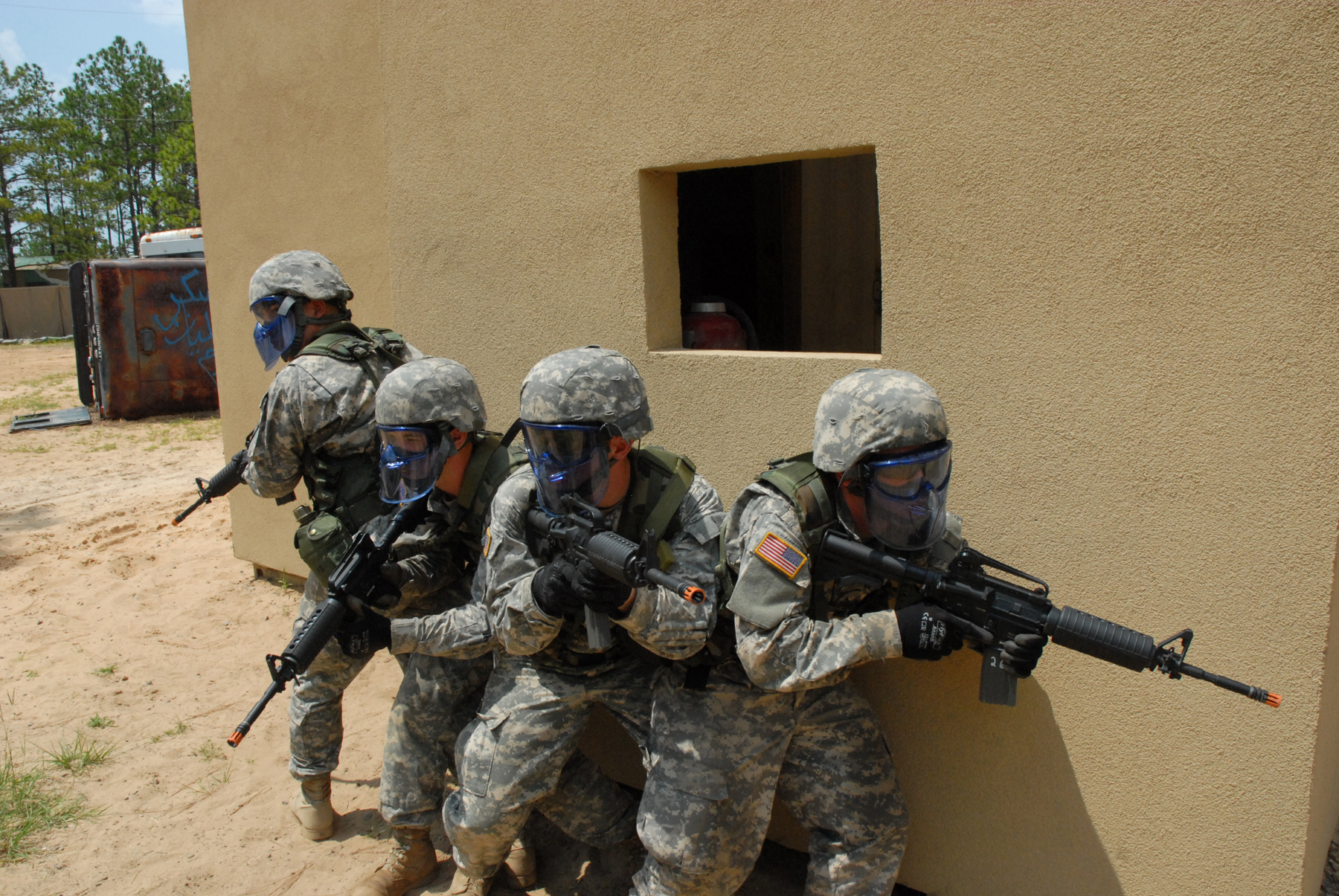
Soldiers with the US Army 187th Ordnance Battalion prepared to clear a room during urban combat training at the battalion's Field Training Exercise site. The soldiers were armed with airsoft weapons as part of a pilot program in 2009.

Airsoft in the past was used almost solely for recreational purposes, but in 2012, gas blowback (GBB) airsoft technology became adopted by US federal and state institutions as an affordable and reliable tactical training tool for close quarters battles. In 2018, the United States Coast Guard officially adopted SIG-branded P229 airsoft pistol for training. The GBB guns allow for correct weapon manipulation drills, muscle memory training, stress inoculation and force-on-force simulations for a fraction of the cost of conventional bolt conversion kits that use marking cartridges with wax bullets from training ammunition manufacturers such as UTM and Simunition. Airsoft guns also allow basic and advanced shooter training in a safer environment by reducing the risks of accidental injury or death from a negligent discharge.

There are clubs, teams, and even athletic associations devoted to airsoft events around the world. Europe is home to some of the largest events, with skirmishes of over 2,000 people participating. In North America, in 2012 alone, Fulda Gap Airsoft Game in Taylorsville, North Carolina had over 1,100 participants, and Operation Lion Claws Military Simulation Series (OLCMSS) had 800 people attend at George Air Force Base in Victorville, California. American Mil-sim, Black Sheep, and Ballahack also host large games.

In many countries, every airsoft gun owner and active enthusiast must be affiliated with an accredited airsoft association or federation. Most airsoft players host games at a registered field where combat situations are simulated using airsoft weaponry like replica pistols, submachine guns, carbines/assault rifles, DMRs/sniper rifles, light machine guns, grenades and landmines. Great variety and profusion of militaria is usually used. Historical reenactment of famous war situations is another favorite of many airsoft players and clubs, such as the Midwest Airsoft Reenactment Society. In addition, a number of companies such as Systema Engineering and Celsius Technology manufacture ultra-realistic high-velocity airsoft rifles designed specifically for the police and military for non-lethal training purposes. People today may also use airsoft guns as props for film making, particularly after the Rust shooting incident.

An Airsoft Two-Tone Gun is an Airsoft replica which has been sprayed over 51% a bright, non military colour, so that it complies with the Violent Crimes Reduction Act (VCRA, 2006), allowing anyone to buy a replica without having to prove that they have a legitimate use for it.

== Types ==
=== Spring-powered ===
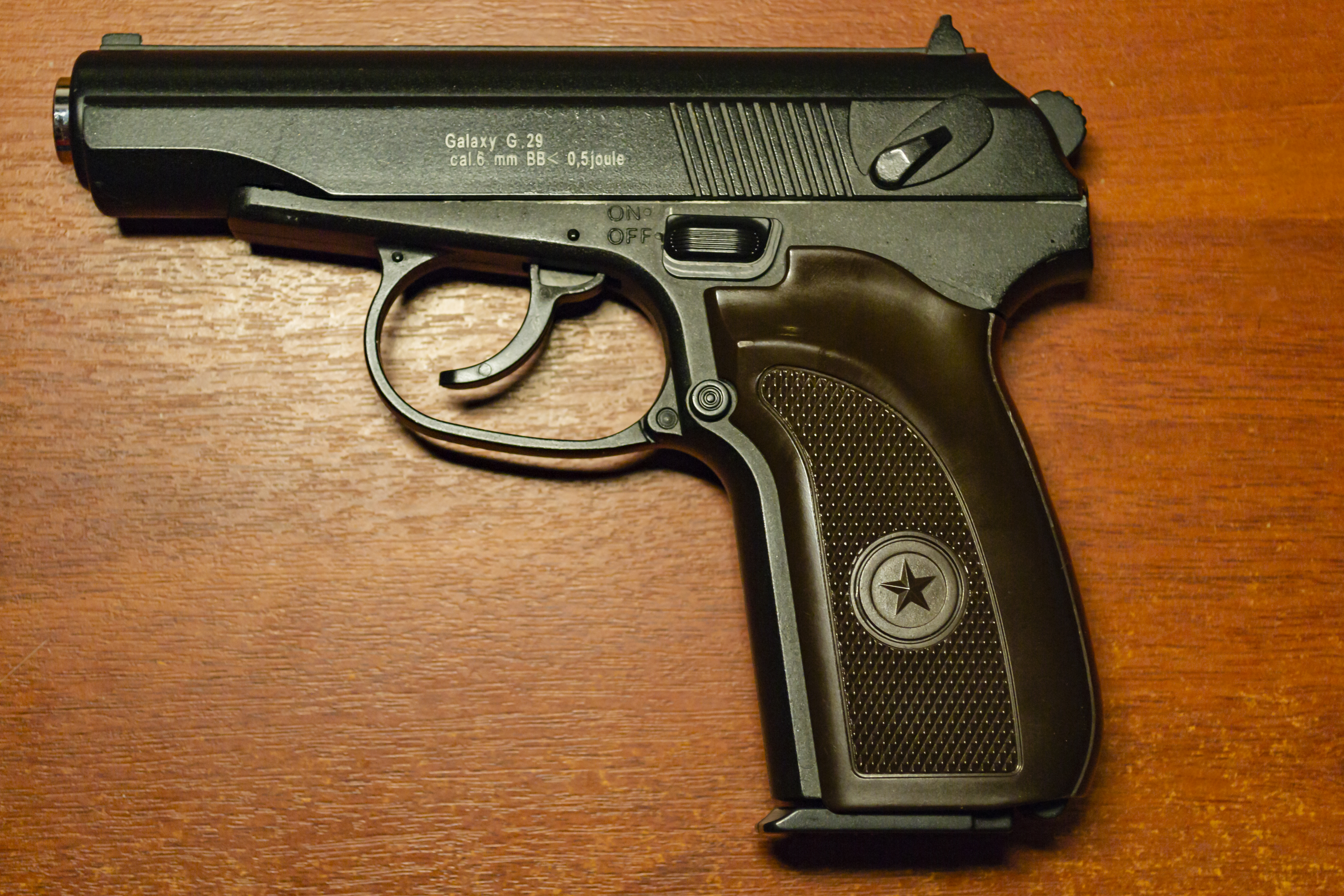
Airsoft Makarov pistol spring system

Spring-powered airsoft guns (or "air-cocking guns" as called by Tokyo Marui) are single-shot devices that use the elastic potential energy stored within a compressed coil spring to drive a piston air pump, which is released upon trigger-pull and rapidly pressurizes the air within the pump cylinder to in turn "blow" pellets down the gun barrel. These guns are almost identical (though simplified and underpowered) in design to spring-piston air guns and have the same operating principles. The user must manually recompress the spring under stress prior to each shot, typically by pulling back the slide (pistols), bolt handle (rifles) or forend pump (shotguns) on the weapon, which cocks and readies the gun. Because of this, spring guns are incapable of automatic or semi-automatic firing by design.

Spring-powered airsoft guns are generally not as powerful as gas-powered ones, but are more powerful than electric airsoft guns because stiffer springs can often be used without the worry of overloading any motor-gearbox, although some spring shotguns and bolt-action rifles can be very powerful with muzzle velocities up to 400–700 ft/s (120–210 m/s). Spring guns are generally inexpensive (except the high-power sniper rifles and shotguns), and may not last long (depending on the build quality) due to the tension exerted on the gun parts by the recoiling of a powerful spring. However, many spring guns can be modified and upgraded to last longer and shoot more powerfully.

Low-end spring guns tend to be much cheaper than their electric equivalents due to their lack of electrical components (electric motor/actuator, spring-gearbox assembly, battery and battery charger). These guns are less common in competitions because their rate-of-fire is a disadvantage against automatic guns in close combat, and they do not provide enough accuracy and power for long-range use. There are some exceptions, however, as higher-end spring-powered airsoft rifles can be quite expensive; these guns are typically suited for "marksman" applications in airsoft matches and provide competitive muzzle velocities. Additionally, pump shotguns are sometimes used for both short and long range engagements.

In colder weather, spring pistols are more reliable than gas-powered pistols and even the batteries on automatic electric pistols (AEPs) both of which can be adversely affected by extremely low temperatures. This represents one of the major advantages of spring airsoft gun, as it can be fired in practically any situation without relying on batteries or bottled gas. This independence from external power sources causes some players to favor spring-powered guns. Spring guns are also less susceptible to the effects of water, where a battery-powered gun could short-circuit and malfunction when wet.

Because of their low price, availability, and simplicity, spring guns tend to act as training guns for new players. In the UK, they are affectionately known as "springers" and were often a player's introduction to the sport due to the entry-level cost in comparison to AEG and GBB weapons. Some veteran airsoft players still rely on sniper rifle and shotgun-type spring guns as a primary weapon due to reliability, high power, accuracy, low noise, and ease of repair compared to AEGs and GBB guns.

=== Battery-powered ===
==== Automatic electric guns (AEGs) ====
An illustration of the working of a Version 2 electric motor gearbox

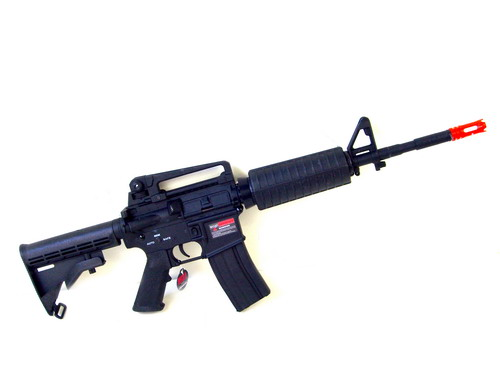
A Dboys M4A1 AEG

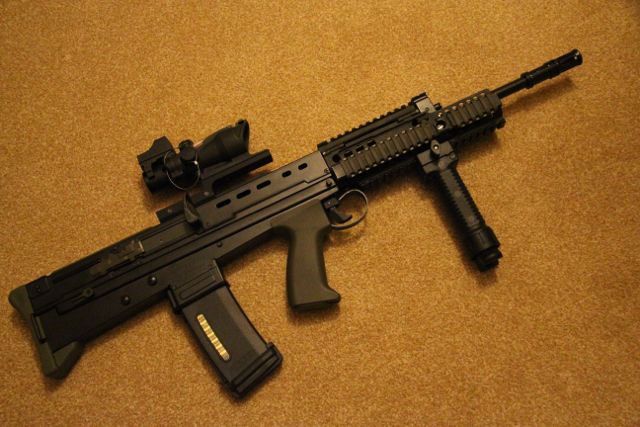
An ARES L85 AEG customized with a Daniel Defense rail interface system, replica ACOG sight, Grip Pod and Magpul PTS EMAG.

Electrically powered airsoft guns use a spring-loaded piston pump just like spring guns, but instead of manual operation they typically use portable rechargeable battery packs to power an internal electric motor, which powers a gearbox, which in turn compresses the pump spring, propels the pellets via the compression of air, and loads the next pellet in cyclic fashion. Selective fire options among automatic, 3-round burst and semi-automatic operations are all possible, which gives these guns the popular name "automatic electric guns", or AEGs. They are the most commonly used and widely available type of airsoft gun.

AEGs were developed in Japan and the Japanese company Tokyo Marui is credited with creating the original gearbox system. In a Tokyo Marui AEG, the motor drives a train of three gears mounted inside a gearbox, which then loads a pump piston against a spring. Once the spring is released, it pushes the piston plunger forward through the pump cylinder to propel a pellet resting within the chamber forward through the barrel and out of the muzzle. Many manufacturers have now more or less replicated this basic model, adding reinforced parts or minor improvements.

The electric airsoft guns were powered primarily by nickel-metal hydride (NiMH) batteries with varying voltages and milliampere-hour ratings. The most common battery is an 8.4 V large battery pack, with a capacity between 2200 and 5000 mAh. Also available are "mini" and "stick" batteries, which generally have 900 ~ 1600 mAh capacities. Voltages for NiMH batteries range from 7.2 V to 12 V. The usual rule of thumb is that the higher the mAh rating, the longer the battery lasts; the higher the voltage, the higher the rate of fire.

Recently, however, the more energy-dense lithium polymer (Li-Po) batteries have become more popular in the airsoft world because they store more energy in a smaller, lighter package. Li-Po batteries though have a shorter lifespan and require more careful management to avoid safety risks.

Recently, however, the more energy-dense lithium polymer (Li-Po) batteries are becoming more popular in the airsoft world, since they last longer, have higher mAh and voltages, and can be charged more frequently without concerns for voltage depression, while at the same time being small and lightweight.

The most common AEGs are the AR-15 series (such as M16 rifle and M4 carbine, sometimes referred to as the ArmaLite or Colt series), the H&K MP5 series, and the AK or Kalashnikov series. Also increasingly popular is the H&K G36 and, more recently, the FN P90 and H&K MP7. Subsequently, numerous parts for repairs and modifications are commonly available for these rifles.

==== Low-powered electric guns (LPEGs) ====
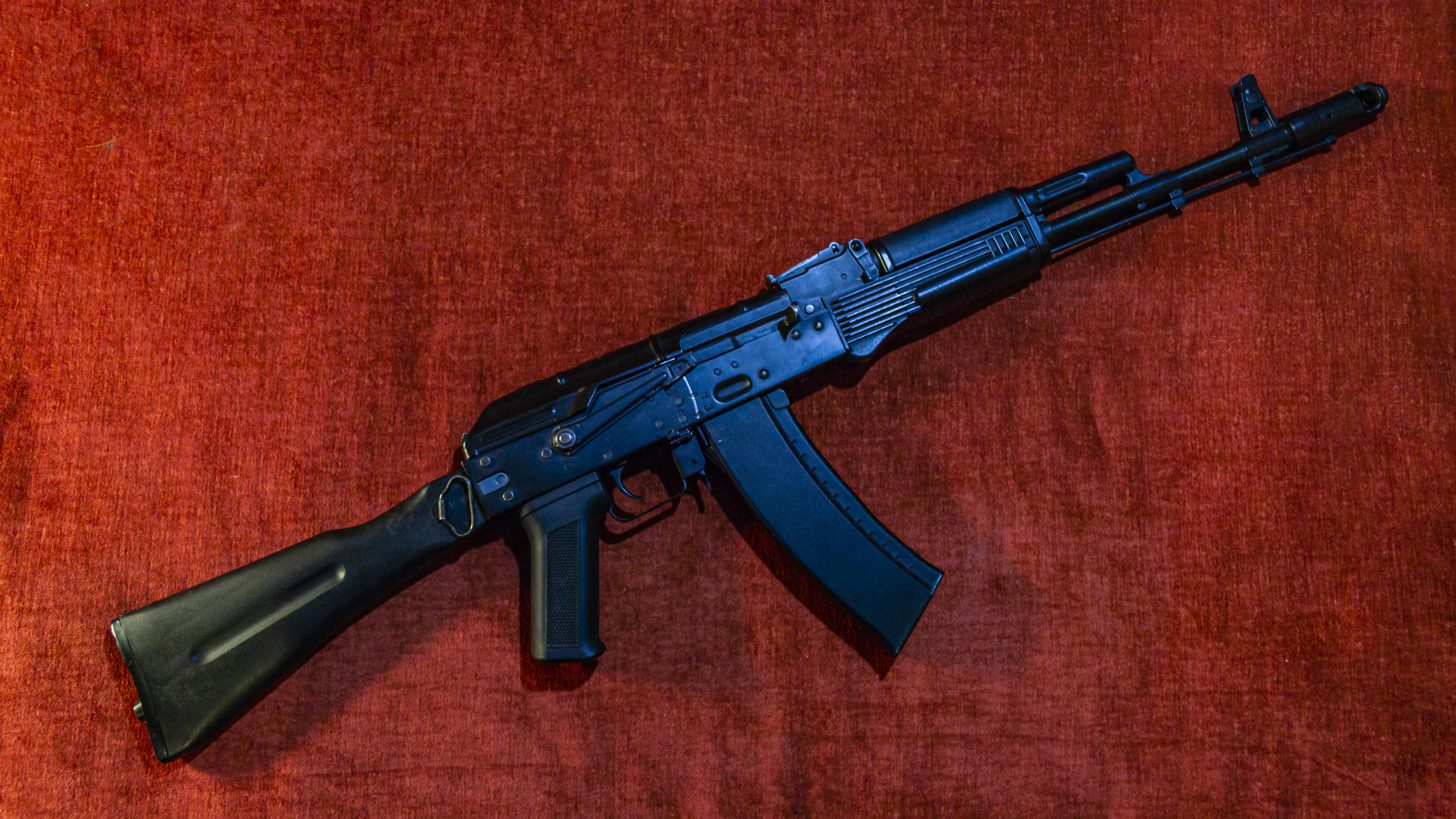
(LPEG) Assault rifle AK-74M replica by CYMA

Some airsoft guns are called low-powered electric guns (LPEGs) to distinguish them from the original, more expensive and more powerful AEGs even though their mechanical/electrical design and operation is similar.

Some companies, like UTG with their popular MP5 and AK-47 models, have improved their quality to such an extent that some models are now considered more affordable AEGs.

==== Electric blowbacks ====
Electric blowbacks, also known as EBBs, are typically available at lower prices than their battery-powered counterparts. They generally run on AAA or AA batteries. Most models utilizing this system are rifles. EBBs simulate the blowback action of a real pistol or rifle. Essentially an AEG in design, EBBs are just as powerful. However, a drawback to having the realistic recoil feature is the tendency of the battery to quickly deplete. Additionally, blowbacks can cause extra stress on the gear box which may result in a shorter life span.

==== Automatic electric pistols ====
Automatic electric pistols, abbreviated AEPs, were first introduced by Tokyo Marui in 2005 with their Glock 18C (followed later by a Beretta 93R model). They were the first handguns to incorporate an electrically powered system that is capable of fully automatic operation.

In cold weather, AEPs are often considered better sidearms than gas powered pistols, because batteries are not as badly affected by frigid weather. Gases like CO_{2} and green gas are stored in liquid form and require heat in order to vaporize. A gas pistol at 10 °F (−12 °C) will usually only get one to two usable shots from a full magazine, and even will be at reduced power because of the lowered pressure of the gas.

Because the AEP gearbox and battery are smaller, the velocity of AEP BBs (usually between 200 and 280 ft/s (85.3 m/s)) is relatively slow by the standards of airsoft simulations, rendering them useful only for close-range simulation. However, the advanced hop up units on these new guns tend to compensate for the low power and can produce an effective range comparable to those of an AEG. CYMA has made a clone Glock 18C, which is a lower priced alternative.

An AEP differs from electric blow-backs because the AEP has a fixed slide (in which there is no external movement of the slide during operation), while an EBB simulates the "blow back" action in the slide experienced in a real pistol or Gas Blow Back (GBB). An AEP, however, has much more power and accuracy.

One of the newer AEP-styled guns is the Marui replica of the Heckler & Koch MP7. It is considerably larger than either of the other guns, and can be upgraded to a much higher power through the use of an external battery, but uses the same system as the AEP, so the classification is ambiguous. It is slightly more powerful than the others and is a suitable choice for CQB (Close Quarter Battle) games due to its small size and decent barrel- to gun-length ratio.

Some semi-automatic pistols can be modified to be automatic pistols. To make them more effective, they use rechargeable batteries supplied with the gun, which can be replaced with a larger battery to increase their ROF.

Due to restrictions on size, either the electric motor or batteries have to occupy space in the hand grip, reducing the available space for a magazine. Because of this, most AEPs do not use a full size magazine found in most gas powered pistols. They are typically constructed almost entirely of plastic and have a light, toy-like feeling to them.

=== Gas-powered ===
==== Gas blowback ====
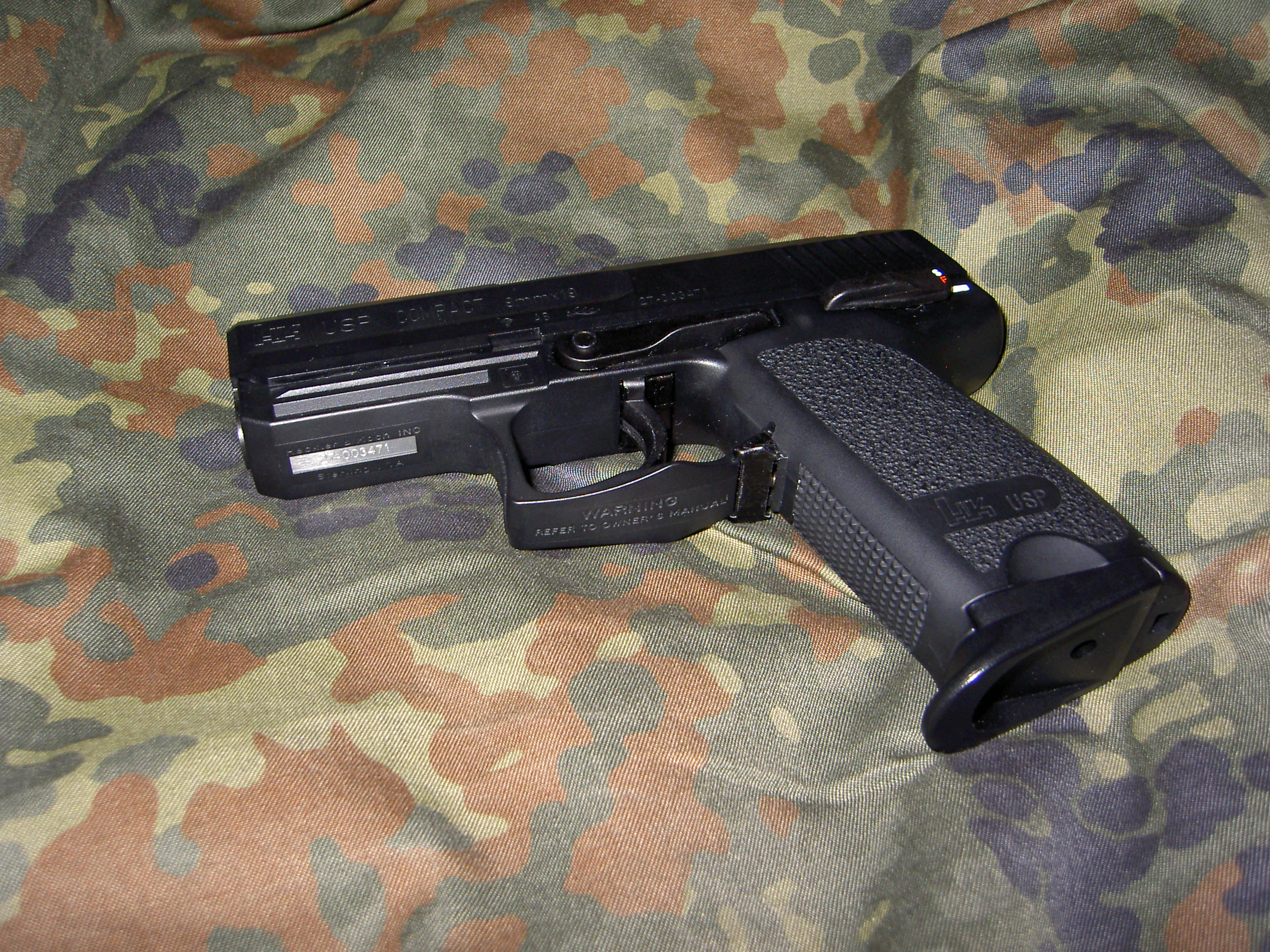
A gas blowback Heckler & Koch USP Compact replica made by KSC

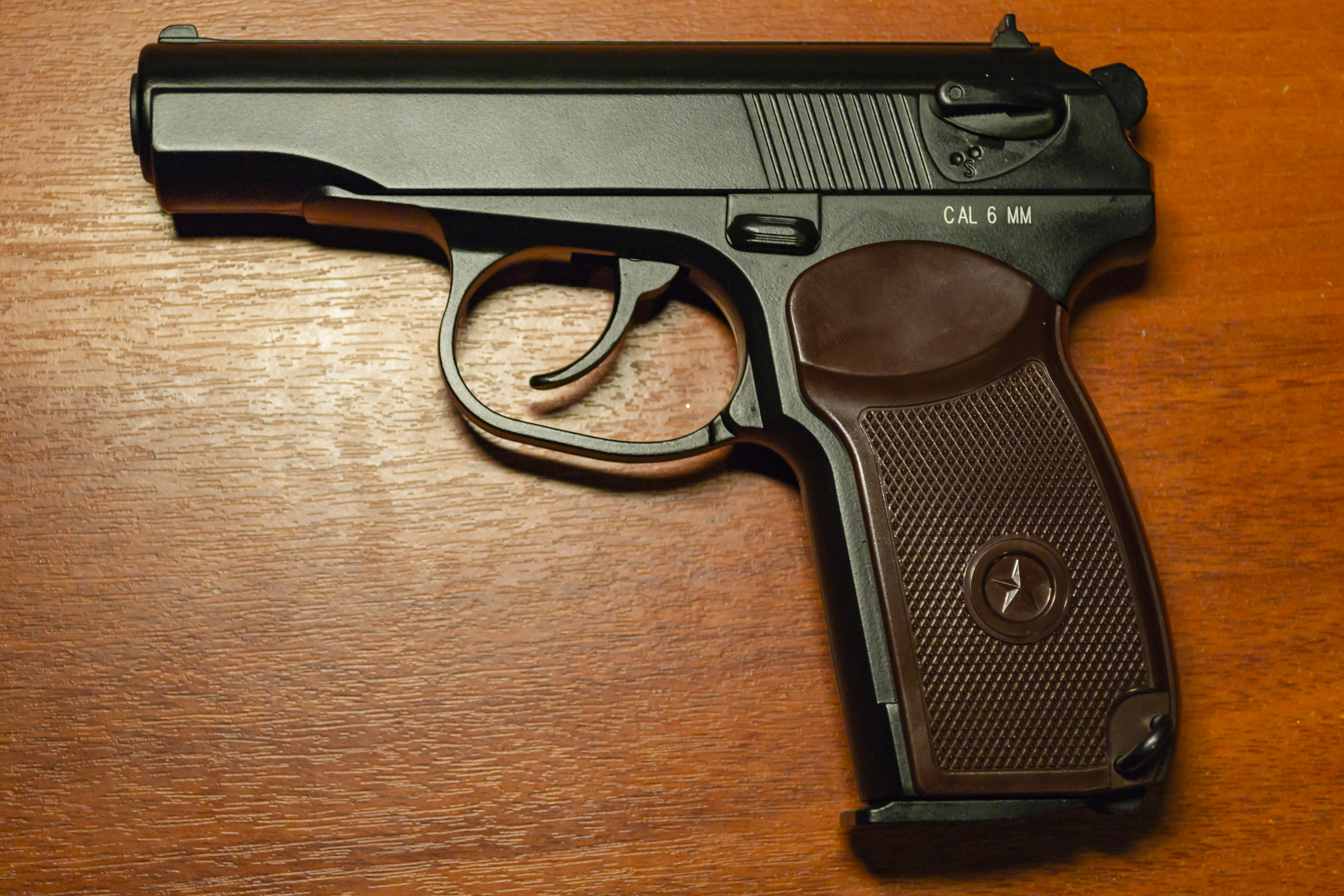
A gas non-blowback Makarov pistol replica by KWC

Gas-powered airsoft guns use the pneumatic potential energy stored within compressed gas to drive the shooting mechanism, and thus operate according to an entirely different design principle to spring- or electrically powered airsoft guns. The most common type seen is the gas blowback (GBB) guns. These gas guns use an internal canister (usually within the magazine) that upon trigger-pull releases the prefilled bottled gas via a series of valves to propel the pellet and generate a blowback, which simulates recoil and cyclically loads the next shot. They are capable of both automatic and semi-automatic operation.

The most common gases used are "green gas" and propane which requires an adaptor. HFC-134a is also commonly used, particularly with pistols which have plastic sliders due to the lower pressure giving a smaller chance of damage to the weaker slide. Less commonly used gases include "red gas" (which is actually HCFC-22), CO_{2} and nitrogen/high-pressure air. However, it is unlawful to use HCFC-22 as a propellant in the US, as it is a Class II ozone-depleting substance and its use as an aerosol propellant has been banned since January 1994 under section 610(d) of Clean Air Act. Red gas is usually avoided unless the airsoft gun has undergone modification, as its relatively high critical pressure can cause damage to the airsoft gun, such as breakage of the slide or bolt. CO_{2}, nitrogen, and high pressure air are less common because they need to be stored at higher pressures than "green gas" or HFC-134a.

The first ever gas powered airsoft guns were commonly referred to as "classic" guns, owing to their age. These guns were most commonly powered by liquid propellants such as R-12 (which was marketed by the Japanese as FLON-12 or DuPont tradename Freon 12) CFC feeding system with a majority of the configurations containing two tanks, one containing the R-12 and one used as an expansion tank, and the gun itself. R-12 was a commonly used refrigerant for car air conditioning and refrigerators, and is considered a highly potent ozone-depleting substance and listed as a Class I Ozone Depleting Substance by the US EPA. Its use as a general purpose aerosol propellant has been banned by the US EPA since March 1978 under 43 FR 11301 for use in aerosol use with a very few exceptions. Its use is also banned in many countries under United Nations treaties. On December 31, 2008, the use of CFCs for medical inhalers was banned.

Later users modified these old guns to be powered by regulated CO_{2} canisters or nitrogen/high pressure air bottles to increase power and consistency. However, these guns have largely been superseded by the newer and more versatile AEGs, or automatic electric guns. One of the reasons for this is because the most commonly available propellant, R-12, is costly. Additionally, at high flow rates, liquid propellants tend to cool down, eventually freezing. As cooldown progresses, the rate of fire gradually decreases until the gun ceases operation. The user would then be forced to wait for the propellant to warm up again. CO_{2} is not affected as badly by this tendency, and nitrogen/high pressure air is immune to it. Furthermore, if liquid propellant is introduced into the gun's mechanism, rubber parts can freeze and eventually damage the gun. However, it is unlikely for this to occur since once the gas is released from the containing cylinder it instantly turns back into its gaseous state, and expands rapidly. It is doubtful whether the retained pressure behind the BB before it begins to accelerate down the barrel is enough to keep the gas in a liquid form. Also, any gun that is expected to be exposed to the intense cold of de-pressurizing gas should have materials that can handle it.

Gas power tends to be used in airsoft pistols where size constraints make electric-powered mechanisms impractical. Other instances where gas is favored are where adjustable velocities are required or where a blowback feature is desired. A blowback feature is a mechanism which cycles a slide or bolt to better simulate a real firearm's operation. Because of the mechanical complexities involved with distributing and regulating gas, these guns have largely given way to electric guns for less specialized applications, however, they still remain favorable amongst most airsofters. They are not just limited to pistols; submachine guns, sniper rifles and assault rifles commonly use gas mechanisms. Whilst the submachine gun replicas typically feature a blowback mechanism similar to the pistol replicas, sniper rifle replicas usually omit the blowback mechanism in favor of reduced recoil and increased muzzle velocity.

Along with using gas to power guns, it is also applied for use in replica grenades. These grenades are either projectiles, fired from a grenade launcher such as the M203 or GP-25, or throwable. The shells work on the system of an internal piston, filled with gas. Either a series of BB's or in some cases a rubber or soft foam head is seated in or on top of the shell. When the pressure is released the projectile(s) are shot from the launcher sent downrange.

In the case of the throwable grenades, inside the grenade there is a similar piston to the one used in the shells, but is on a literal "timer" that allows the user to clear the area of effect. BBs or powder acts as the projectile in the case of these grenades. Currently both types of grenades are not very common, mostly because grenade launchers are quite expensive and the throwable grenades are not very reliable.

==== High pressure air systems ====
High pressure air (HPA) systems are a type of pneumatic airsoft weapon that use externally supplied high pressure air instead of internal gas canisters like the majority of gas-operated airsoft guns. They work by using a separate high-pressure air tank that is connected to the airsoft gun with a hose, which is connected with a pneumatic motor inside the gun (called an "engine") where the gearbox would normally be in a standard electric airsoft gun. The engine is powered by a fire control unit that typically can adjust to the desired rates of fire as well as the dwell that determines how much air is released with each individual shot.

=== Hybrid guns ===
- AEG hybrid operation: The magazine is loaded with shell cases, each containing a single plastic pellet. These shell casings can have a small red cap, the same as those found in any child's toy cap gun placed on the top of them. These hybrid guns feature an electrically powered, full blowback system and operate on a "round-per-shell" basis such that for every pellet fired, a shell casing is ejected and the cap is fired providing a realistic sound and smoke effect. Since its debut, the only hybrid guns seen on the market are TOP M4A1, as well as M1 Garand, Kar98, and other rifle models. These guns are the least common type of gun on the market today and are generally used by collectors and re-enactors rather than skirmishers.
- Gas blowback hybrid operation: Hybrid gas blowback airsoft guns are quite similar to hybrid AEGs and their operations are similar to ordinary gas blowback airsoft guns. A single 6 mm pellet is still loaded to a shell casing. Then it is placed into a magazine. The airsoft replica itself also has a tank for compressed gas as propellant (such as green gas). So as the slide/bolt is pulled back, it loads a shell into the chamber. As the trigger is pulled, it releases a small burst of propellant and the pellet is forced out the barrel.

=== Training weapons ===
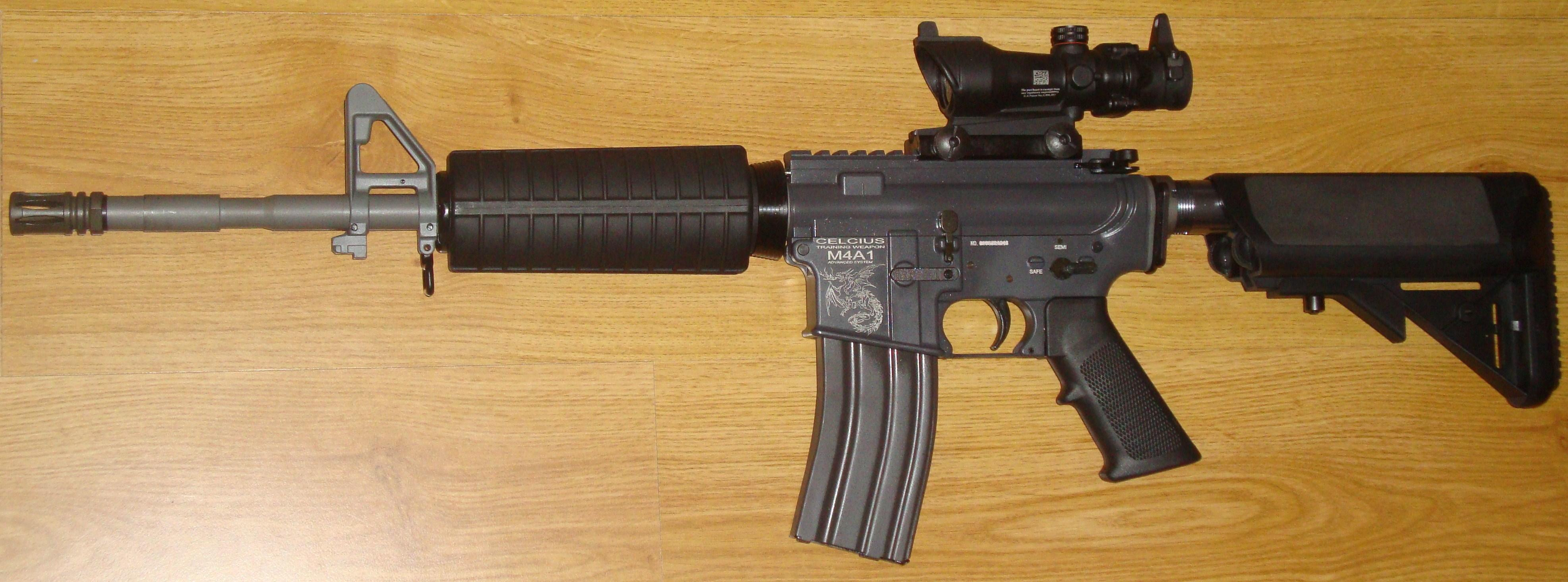
An airsoft gun made by Celcius Technology (Hong Kong). This training weapon model is a replica of the M4A1 and also has a G&G Trijicon ACOG scope replica.

Airsoft gun manufacturer Systema Engineering (PTW) developed a line of airsoft guns and accessories intended for military and law enforcement training. These airsoft guns are made of aircraft-grade aluminium combined with stainless steel parts that gives strength, stability, weather protection, and easy maintenance. These training weapons offer a more realistic display of military weapons. Unfortunately they have been plagued by reliability problems and parts availability. They have also had models banned from the US for being capable of being converted into real firearms. Two manufactures, King Arms and KWA, came out with ATF-approved gas blowback AR-15 replicas that allowed for correct weapons tear down, manipulation and function that were designed for military use, but were also legal for US citizens to own. The King Arms model required upgrade parts out of the parts to give it reliability, though the KWA was plagued by a weak hop-up system, but otherwise reliable.

On November 5, 2018, the United States Coast Guard, which has long used the .40 caliber SIG P229 as its duty sidearm, announced that it will acquire the SIG ProForce P229 CO_{2} airsoft pistol (which was then produced under brand licensing by French airsoft manufacturer CyberGun, before SIG later ceased external licensing and took over the production in early 2019) as its new training pistol to give cadets and guardsmen the ability to practice gun handling, conduct target practice in various environments, and train in realistic force-on-force scenarios.

== Performance ==
Airsoft guns shoot plastic pellets at velocities from 30 m/s (98 ft/s) for a low-end spring pistol, to 200 m/s (660 ft/s) for heavily upgraded customized sniper rifles. Most non-upgraded AEGs are in the middle, producing velocities from 90 m/s (300 ft/s) to 120 m/s (390 ft/s). The internal components of most guns can be upgraded which can increase the pellet velocity significantly. Using heavier pellets (.25 g, .3 g, etc.) will significantly reduce the gun's muzzle velocity, but can increase accuracy at range and reduce susceptibility to wind drift. Lighter pellets have less kinetic energy than their heavier pellets, despite their higher exit velocity. Decreasing the pellet's weight does not generally increase its range.

A common upgrade done by players is in the "hop-up" system, featured in most mid- to high-end AEGs, as well as gas guns and spring sniper rifles. In this system, the wall of a rubber tube, called a bucking, is forced into the upper path of the pellet right before it begins flying down the inner barrel. This contact imparts backspin, which in turn gives the pellet a Magnus lift to maintain a flatter trajectory for a longer period of time. This is adjusted by screws or gears that cause the bucking to only show a small or large presence in the barrel. Different degrees of firmness of the rubber are considered when a hop-up is being upgraded.

== Safety ==
Airsoft is safe when played with proper protective gear. Most airsoft guns on the market are usually below 350 ft/s (110 m/s), but projectiles expelled from any type of airsoft gun can travel as slow as 65 ft/s (20 m/s) to more than 700 ft/s (210 m/s) and are capable of breaking skin at 350–400 ft/s (110–120 m/s). For example, skirmish play in the United Kingdom has a maximum of 350 ft/s, with some airsoft locations having a limit as low as 290 ft/s. If under 300 ft/s (91 m/s), the hit would have to be within a short range. Blood can be drawn, but injuries that do occur are predominantly superficial. Full-seal protective eyewear (goggles or glasses) is widely considered the minimum protection for airsoft players, as the eyes may be injured by any type of impact. The least amount of protection a player should seek will meet or exceed ANSI/ISEA Z87.1 standards, which indicates the eyewear is rated for ballistic strikes. Mesh eyewear has also seen some limited use by players due to low cost and its inability to fog, although it has drawn some criticism for its non-impact rated construction and vulnerability to debris. Some impacts (particularly at close range with powerful guns) are capable of cracking or damaging teeth. Dentists have reported broken teeth that require root canal and crowns to repair damage. A face mask (like that used for paintball) is recommended to protect eyes and teeth. Metallic mesh masks and mouth guards have recently seen popular use.

There are legal issues in airsoft as well as several rules imposed in a game by game basis. Most indoor airsoft fields only allow up to 350 ft/s (110 m/s), and most outdoor fields begin capping near the 410 ft/s (125 m/s) for rifles and 525 ft/s (160 m/s) for long-range guns such as sniper rifles. Most outdoor fields also impose a minimum engagement distance for guns firing over a certain range, normally for squad support weapons and sniper rifles. In order for an airsoft gun to cause any serious injury, it would have to be well over these limits and in close proximity. To even reach such speeds, the gun would have to be highly modified. So it is therefore unlikely to cause permanent or serious damage with any stock airsoft gun. The use of metallic BBs, or any foreign objects, is very dangerous for the user and other people and property in close vicinity, and may damage the airsoft gun as well. However, specially designed and built metallic 6 mm BBs for airsoft guns can be found on the market. These metallic BBs should not be used for airsoft play because they can break through goggles and other safety gear. Plastic BBs can be a mixture of PLA and Plastic causing less damage to persons.

Although airsoft guns in the United States are generally sold with a 6 mm (0.24in.) or longer orange tip on the barrel in order to distinguish them from real firearms, this is not in fact required by federal law. There is some controversy on this topic as Title 15 of the Code of Federal Regulations, on foreign commerce and trade, stipulates that "no person shall manufacture, enter into commerce, ship, transport, or receive any toy, look-alike, or imitation firearm" without approved markings; these may include an orange tip, orange barrel plug, brightly colored exterior of the whole toy, or transparent construction (part 272.2, formerly part 1150.2). However, section 272.1 (formerly 1150.1) clearly indicates that these restrictions shall not apply to "traditional b-b, paint-ball, or pellet-firing air guns that expel a projectile through the force of compressed air, compressed gas or mechanical spring action, or any combination thereof." Local laws may differ by jurisdiction. Full or partial preventive painting of airsoft guns as a legal obligation to avoid confusion of the airsoft replicas with real lethal weapons is in practice in several jurisdictions around the world.

A common controversy referred to as "pumping" or "roping" is the act of purposely firing 20+ airsoft rounds at one player until they run away or submit in pain. Popular videos such as Rip Kid and SC Trip 2015 have both documented the act of pumping.

=== Police and security shootings ===
A CBS News report noted that since from 2014 to 2024, more than 300 people had been shot and killed by police while holding realistic replica guns, of which 19 were minors.

- On January 13, 2006, Christopher Penley, a 15-year-old student with an airsoft gun painted entirely black, was killed by a SWAT team member at Milwee Middle School in Longwood, Florida.
- On October 22, 2013, in Santa Rosa, California, 13-year-old Andy Lopez was shot by a Sonoma County sheriff's deputy Erick Gelhaus. Lopez was walking with other children and carrying an airsoft gun that was designed to resemble an AK-47 assault rifle. Gelhaus opened fire, killing Lopez with seven bullets.
- On August 5, 2014, John Crawford, while handling a BB gun in a Walmart store near Dayton, Ohio, was shot to death by Beavercreek Police.
- On November 22, 2014, in Cleveland, Ohio, Tamir Rice, a 12-year-old boy with an airsoft gun, was shot and killed by police. After a 911 caller reported a juvenile male with a "probably fake" gun on a playground, police arrived on the scene, but had not been told by the dispatcher that the gun may have been fake. Police reported that they asked the boy to show his hands, but he reached for his waistband instead. The police fatally shot him within two seconds of arriving on the scene. Police later said that the orange tip indicating the gun was a toy had been removed.
- On November 25, 2014, police in Vancouver, Washington reported to the scene of a domestic dispute to find 31-year-old Sebastian T. Lewandowski with an airsoft replica of an AR-15. When he refused to put down what appeared to be an AR-15, the officers fired at Lewandowski. He died at the scene.
- On August 30, 2018, 49-year-old actress Vanessa Marquez was fatally injured after threatening police officers with an airsoft gun. During a wellness check, conducted at her apartment, she first refused to accompany the officers to hospital, despite her poor health and then threatened them with a gun, that turned out to be a replica later on. She was shot several times and died on her way to hospital.
- On January 15, 2019, police in Tempe, Arizona shot and killed a 14-year-old boy, Antonio Arce, who was carrying a replica 1911 airsoft gun. The officer's body camera picked up the officer, after the shooting, saying, "Fuck man, he's just a fucking kid. It's a fucking toy gun,"
- On April 13, 2021, Maryland State Police, responding to 911 calls of a suspicious gunman, fatally shot a 16-year-old boy, Peyton Ham, in Leonardtown, Maryland, after he pointed an airsoft gun at a state trooper.
- On December 15, 2021, San Pablo police shot and killed a man who was carrying an airsoft gun they thought was a real gun.
- On June 5, 2024, an off-duty security guard fatally shot a 17-year-old boy in Renton, Washington who was trying to exchange an airsoft gun at a sporting goods store.
- On June 28, 2024, police in Utica, New York shot and killed a 13-year-old Southeast Asian refugee named Nyah Mway, who was holding a replica Glock.

== Trademark problems ==
Some airsoft guns can be such accurate replicas that they violate intellectual property laws (specifically those regarding trademarks), most notably some models from Tokyo Marui bearing Colt or Heckler & Koch trademarks that may not be imported into the United States. Certain companies such as Classic Army or ICS avoid this problem by licensing their replicas from the original manufacturers, such as ArmaLite by license from ActionSportGames or Olympic Arms. The airsoft company ActionSportGames has licensed trademark rights from many well-known firearm manufacturers, such as Armalite, Dan Wesson, CZ, Steyr, STI, B&T and Franchi.

Another company who licence the designs of gun companies is Evolution International. It has a portfolio of exclusive licenses from ADC Armi Dallera Custom, TangoDown, Z-M Weapons, DSR precision, Lone Star Tactical, and SAR. In addition, there have been reports of companies taking action in defense of their intellectual property rights. Some end users have made attempts to sell their guns, some in the style of Glock pistols, only to find Glock blocking the sale and threatening legal action. In addition to these actions, Glock, as well as Heckler & Koch, have blocked the sale, trade and distribution of replicas bearing resemblance to their products. Recently, Glock gave the licensing to the Glock name and likeness to Elite Force/Umarex to produce replica models of the real Glock series of firearms.

The United States Coast Guard, which has long used the .40 caliber SIG P229 as its duty sidearm, announced on November 5, 2018, that it would acquire the SIG Air ProForce P229 airsoft pistol (then produced under brand licensing by French airsoft manufacturer CyberGun) as a training pistol for cadets and guardsmen. In response, SIG Air, SIG Sauer's airgun division, announced on January 17, 2019, that it was introducing its own in-house ProForce airsoft line for professional training, with the initial offerings include the M17 and P229 airsoft pistol. SIG Air also announced that "we are rapidly expanding the SIG AIR business, and it is important to us to assume full control to ensure all SIG Air products are of the highest quality", and it would no longer be licensing the "SIG" brand or trademarks for sale by commercial airsoft manufacturers.

== See also ==
- Air gun
- Airsoft pellets
- BB gun
- Entertech
- Gel ball shooter
- Hop-up (airsoft)
- Legal issues in airsoft
- Paintball
- Toy gun
- Xploderz
