= Airsoft =

Type of shooting sport and hobby activity

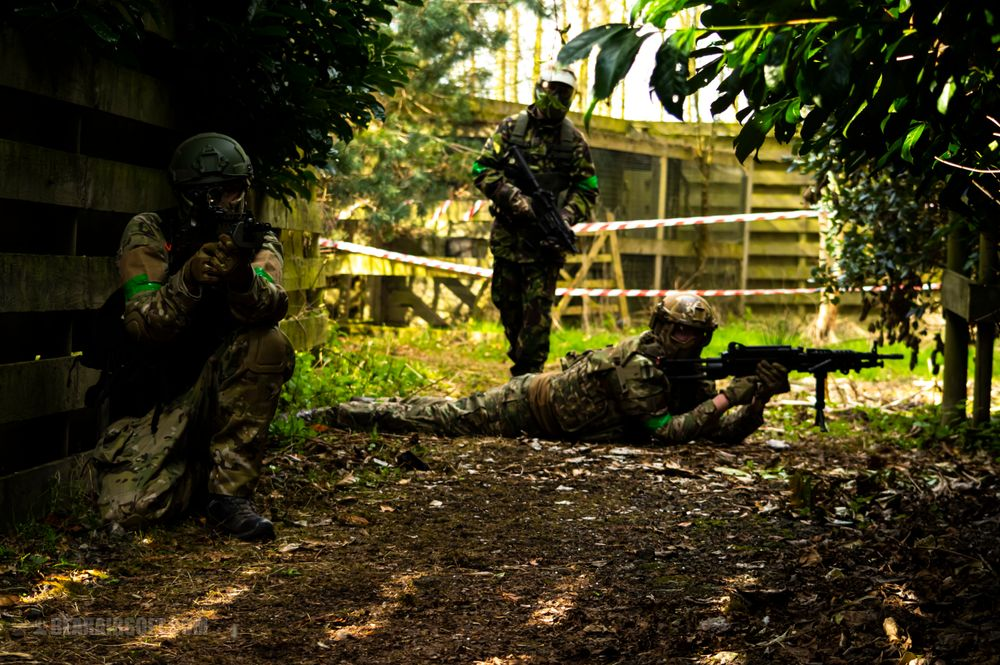
- Airsoft players defending an objective.
- First played: Early 1970s in Japan

Characteristics
- Contact: Dependent on ruleset
- Mixed-sex: Yes
- Type: MilSim, Live action role-playing game, team sport, outdoor and indoor sports
- Equipment: Airsoft guns, airsoft pellets, goggles
- Venue: Varies between outdoor (fields or woods) and indoor

Presence
- Country or region: Worldwide

Airsoft, (Note: Also known worldwide by the acronym ASG for Airsoft gun) also known as survival game (Note: (Japanese: サバイバルゲーム, romanized: sabaibaru gēmu)) in Japan, is a shooting sport in which players use airsoft guns to tag opponents with plastic airsoft pellets. Airsoft originated in Japan in the early 1970s from realistic model guns originally developed for target shooting. It spread to Europe and North America in the late 1980s and early 1990s and is now played worldwide.

Unlike paintball, airsoft pellets do not leave visible marks, so the sport relies heavily on an honor system in which players acknowledge being hit. Airsoft is played in a variety of formats, including skirmishes, close quarters battle games, military simulations, and historical reenactments, on indoor and outdoor fields.

Airsoft guns resemble real firearms and are used for military simulation and historical reenactment; they have also been adopted for military and law enforcement training.

== History ==
Airsoft originated in postwar Japan during the early 1970s, when photographer Ichiro Nagata, an avid shooting enthusiast himself, thought about making modelguns that shoot real projectiles that could not kill or wound. Early airsoft guns use a manual spring-piston design and are essentially single-shot, tailoring to the needs of shooting enthusiasts while conforming to Japan's strict weapons control laws. Originally designed for target shooting, the plastic balls used in these "guns" can be shot at humans without causing injury due to the low muzzle energy.

In 1986, toy car manufacturer Tokyo Marui introduced a gas blowback replica of the Smith & Wesson Model 59 designed by modelgun inventor Tanio Kobayashi, which used compressed 1,1,1,2-tetrafluoroethane (Freon) refrigerant in a lubricant mixture with silicone oil (later replaced by a propane-silicone oil mixture known as "Green Gas") as the propellant gas. These new-generation replica guns were trademarked as soft air guns because the refrigerant propellant used was significantly weaker ("soft") than the canistered CO_{2} used in proper airguns (pellet guns and BB guns). Tokyo Marui later in 1992 released the first model of its revolutionary "automatic electric gun" (AEG) design, which was a FAMAS F1 replica that used an electric motor-gear box drivetrain to cycle the reciprocating motion of a spring-piston powerplant, allowing sustainable rapid-fire using only rechargeable batteries instead of needing periodic gas replenishment. This practical convenience of AEGs led soft air guns to quickly become popular for casual MilSim games, which the Japanese call survival games (サバイバルゲーム, sabaibaru gēmu). Asahi Firearms was also a model company from Japan who operated in the 1980s and 90s and was one of the early pioneers of the airsoft hobby.

Airsoft guns spread to the United Kingdom in the late 1980s and early 1990s via a company called LS. They were sold in separate pieces and had to be assembled out-of-box before they were capable of shooting. These then became available to the rest of Europe and North America and rapidly gained popularity worldwide. Since the mid-1980s, airsoft has been adapted with a purely recreational application in mind, and the sport is enjoyed by all ages. Airsoft replicas are produced globally, with the majority being manufactured in East Asia. Many law enforcement agencies and military units within the United States now start using airsoft for force-on-force tactical training drills.

== Equipment ==
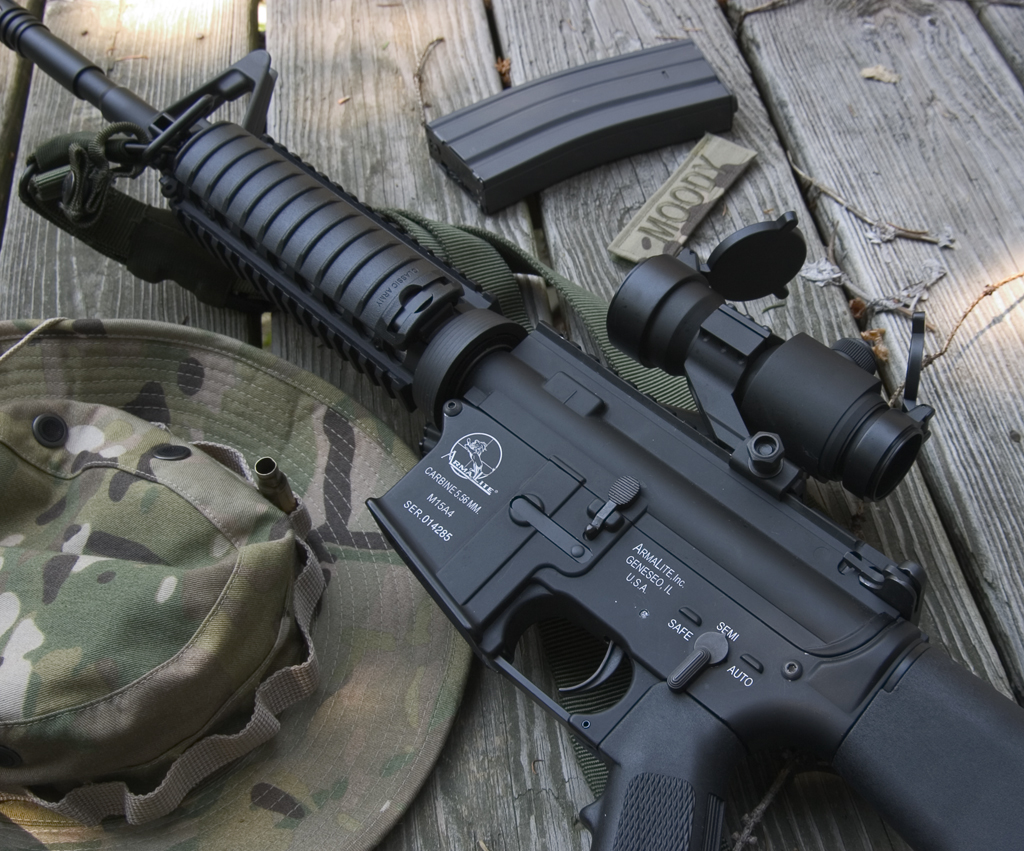
Classic Army M4A1 Carbine AEG with Aimpoint Comp M2 Replica Red dot sight

The guns used in airsoft are typically classified as imitation firearms. They have a mechanism for shooting projectiles 6 mm, 6.4 mm, or 8 mm in diameter.

Airsoft guns are classified according to their operating principle, which can be spring-loaded, electric (battery-powered Automatic Electric Guns, Airsoft Electric Guns or "AEGs"), gas-powered, which may be referred to as Gas Blowback (GBB) if including blowback features or alternatively Non-blowback (NBB) if they do not. Some companies produce full replicas of counterpart grenade launchers which fire a projectile spray of 6 millimetres (0.24 in) pellets by use of a high-powered spring mechanism or a compressed gas propellant (i.e. green gas, propane, compressed air, or CO_{2}). There is also a type of airsoft gun that is powered by a single (HPA) high-pressure air tank and a battery pack to power the internal FCU "Fire Control Unit" computer board. These guns are often known for their high and adjustable RPS or "Rounds Per Second" and durability. These HPA replicas are most often referred to as "PolarStars", although this refers to a popular brand of HPA engines and accessories.

A typical airsoft gun is noticeably lighter than its "real steel" counterpart due to the use of aluminum alloy and plastic materials, though some have added weights in them for a more realistic feel. Japan has specific rules about producing airsoft guns with metal parts, while newer guns, especially those made in Taiwan and Mainland China, have both internal and external parts that are metallic. Smoke caps, as well as noise amplifiers, are available for certain airsoft guns to add realism.

Gas handgun magazines usually contain 10 to 30 pellets in a standard-capacity magazine; however, some are high-capacity magazines and can hold 50 rounds or more. In the case of AEG rifles, magazines come in either real-capacity (equivalent to the 30-round capacity of its real steel counterpart), low-capacity (10–50 rounds), mid-capacity (75–250 rounds), or high-capacity (250+ rounds). These magazines have spring followers like in BB guns. The high-cap magazines often have a ratchet wheel that can be wound up periodically to force pellets up from the holding chamber of the magazine to the feeding chute. Due to loose pellets in the reservoir, they often make a rattling noise when running or walking. Some airsoft guns have a battery-powered box or drum magazine that holds thousands of pellets, but these are usually only used and allowed on LMGs (light machine gun) type replicas.

It is common for owners to "tech" (modify) their guns. The majority of gearboxes are made to Tokyo Marui specifications and have aftermarket upgrade parts available commercially. Some gearboxes are proprietary in design. It is also possible to perform DIY modifications.

=== Hop-up ===
The "hop-up" system, which is installed in most stock airsoft rifles and pistols, is used to increase effective ranges by putting backspin on the pellets. The Magnus effect causes the pellets to experience more lift as they are shot, counteracting against gravity. A small rubber nub protrudes into the top of the barrel through a small hole, applies pressure on a rubber bucking, and catches the top of the pellet as it moves past. Adjusting the hop-up makes the nub more or less protrude into the bucking, so that backspin is increased or reduced. Ideally, the hop-up should be adjusted so that the pellets fly as far as possible in a straight line without curving upward too far or dropping too quickly. Hop-Up does decrease the muzzle velocity (a gun firing 340 ft/s (100 m/s) with the hop fully unwound can drop to as low as 300 ft/s (91 m/s)). Ease and location of adjustment vary by gun design; some equipment provides a control that can be adjusted quickly during gameplay, while others may require partial disassembly. For example, a common location for Hop-Up adjustment is where the ejection port would be on a real firearm, which allows the machine to be covered while still allowing quick access to adjust the Hop-Up.

=== Customization ===
Some players customize their airsoft guns, either to improve performance or for purely aesthetic reasons. Additions include scopes, fore-grips, and flashlights, red dot sights being the most commonly used. Red dot sights are used to help aim, fore-grips are used to get a better grip on the airsoft gun, and flashlights (whether mounted or held in another hand) are used to illuminate dark areas and/or to blind opponents.

Even though in certain countries lasers are illegal, they are popular attachments in the U.S. and Europe. Laser sights are more for their appearance than any practical effect, largely because they must be weak enough not to carry a risk of damaging another player's eyesight, which rules out using any laser powerful enough to produce a visible dot on the target in sunlight (although lasers can be useful for night games).

Also available are "mock suppressors/silencers". These resemble the actual firearm accessory that dampens sound. Since Airsoft does not use combustibles for propulsion these usually serve no function. Although there are models that function to "light up" a glow-in-the-dark BB using UV light similar to a tracer round.

== Projectile ==
Most airsoft guns fire round plastic pellets, usually white, but Tracers are common as well. The pellets mostly range from 0.12 to 0.48 g. However, the most popular weights for AEGs (automatic electric guns) and GBB* (Gas Blow-Back guns) are 0.20 g to 0.32 g (whose muzzle velocity ranges from approximately 250 ft/s (76 m/s) to 400 ft/s (120 m/s)). Heavier rounds (0.36–0.40 g) are typically used in long-range and sniper applications since they are more stable in flight and less easily deflected by wind.

The pellets, which are called BBs (ball bearings), are usually bought in bags or bottles of 2,000 to 5,000, but other sizes are available, such as a 250,000 round (65 kg) package of tournament grade BBs. Biodegradable BBs are a fraction more expensive than non-bio counterparts, but many fields require them. BBs are typically 5.95mm ±0.01 mm in diameter.

=== Ballistics ===
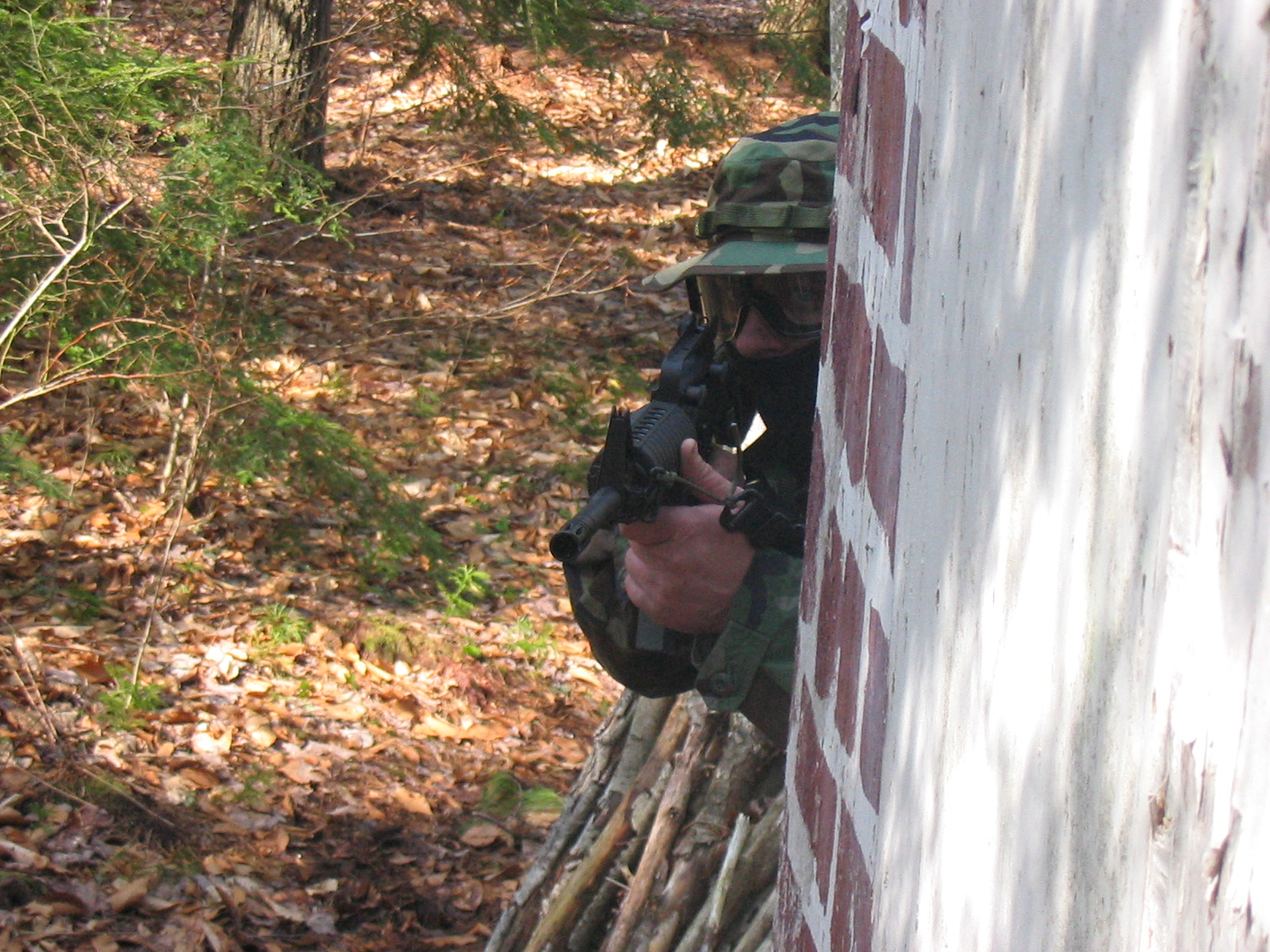
An airsoft player shooting from behind cover, wearing goggles to fully seal the area around the eyes and a balaclava to protect the face

Kinetic energy calculator
BB mass	0.2 g
Muzzle velocity	350 ft/s
Energy	1.138 J

Due to the low muzzle energy (less than 1.5 J or 1.1 ft⋅lb even for high-power models) and poor sectional density, the pain an airsoft pellet causes on skin impact is about the same as getting pinched. As a reference value, a standard 0.20 gram 6 mm pellet, which is the most common size and weight, traveling at 100 m/s (330 ft/s) has 1 J (0.74 ft⋅lb) of kinetic energy.

Calculating the kinetic energy of an airsoft projectile is important for ensuring player safety. While a projectile’s ability to cause injury or penetrate a surface technically depends on energy density—that is, the kinetic energy divided by the impact area—this variable is nearly constant in airsoft, as most BBs have standardized diameters of 6 mm or 8 mm. As a result, the primary factor affecting the potential for injury or penetration is simply the kinetic energy of the BB. Despite this, safety limits in airsoft are often expressed solely in FPS, which fails to account for variations in BB mass. Heavier BBs, even at the same FPS, can carry more kinetic energy, a situation sometimes referred to in airsoft as "joule creep."

The kinetic energy formula is:

$E_k=\frac{1}{2}mv^2$

where $m$ is the mass in kilograms and $v$ is the speed in meters per second.

Different regions vary in the velocity airsoft guns are allowed to shoot at. In the United States, velocity differs from the type of gameplay field. Close Quarter Battle arenas typically regulate velocity on airsoft guns at around 110 m/s (350 ft/s). For outdoor fields, velocity is usually regulated by the type of gun. With a standard 0.20 grams (3.1 gr) pellet, fully automatic Airsoft Electric Guns (AEGs) are often set at less than 120 m/s (400 ft/s), semi-automatic DMR-style AEGs at 120–140 m/s (400–450 ft/s), and bolt-action (manually cocked spring-piston) sniper rifles at 140–150 m/s (450–500 ft/s).

The maximum effective range of field-legal airsoft guns is around 100 m (110 yd) with a highly upgraded sniper rifle replica. Most airsoft guns used for field play will have an effective range of around 43–67 m (47–73 yd), depending on the intended gameplay role. Most Airsoft guns are capable of shooting from 60 to 125 m/s (200 to 410 ft/s), although it is also possible to purchase upgraded internals that will enable the gun to shoot up to 170 m/s (550 ft/s) or higher. In California, a common limit for CQB is 110 m/s (350 ft/s). In Ireland, Italy and Japan the muzzle energy limit for airsoft guns is 1 joule no matter what the type of gameplay. In the UK, the law allows weapons locked to semi-automatic and bolt-action rifles to fire up to 2.5 joules (at muzzle velocity up to 158 m/s or 518 ft/s). Any weapon "which is capable of discharging two or more missiles successively without repeated pressure on the trigger" is limited, by law, at 1.3 joules (velocity up to 114 m/s or 374 ft/s). Northern Ireland has a maximum velocity of 100 m/s (330 ft/s) with 0.20 g pellets, without regard to the type of equipment. In Sweden, the legal limitations of airsoft guns caps the energy limit at 10 joules for manual guns, and 3 joules for semi- and fully automatic guns.

The ballistics of spring- or electrically powered airsoft guns differ from real firearms in that a longer barrel will not always result in better accuracy. The "sweet spot" for barrel length in a spring/electric powered airsoft gun is around 450 mm (18 in), beyond which added barrel length will not improve accuracy. In any case, barrel quality, velocity consistency, and hopup quality/design are more important factors with regard to accuracy. Added barrel length will result in slightly increased velocity if the cylinder size and compression are appropriate for the barrel length. For example, a gun with a large cylinder and a long barrel will shoot slightly harder than a gun with a small cylinder and a short barrel (ceteris paribus). This rule will apply even for barrels longer than 500 mm (20 in), if there is enough cylinder volume and air compression to propel the pellet through the barrel. However, the resulting velocity increase will be hardly noticeable. The only considerable advantage of using a longer inner barrel in an AEG or spring-powered gun is that it generally will make the gun quieter due to the weakened muzzle pop.

In gas-powered guns, added barrel length (to an appropriate extent) can result in increased velocity and accuracy to a degree. Tighter-bore barrels will increase velocity because there will be less space between the pellet and the barrel for the air to escape through. Most stock airsoft guns have 6.03–6.05 mm (0.237–0.238 in) bore barrels, but best performance is usually seen with "tightbore" barrels, which are 6.01–6.05 mm (0.237–0.238 in) in diameter. However, the tighter the bore, the more likely the chance of a pellet jam, and subsequently, tightbores need to be cleaned and lubricated regularly. It is generally agreed upon that a high-quality 6.01-6.02 mm barrel will provide the highest muzzle velocity, while a good-quality 6.03 mm or 6.05 mm barrel will provide the best compromise between power, accuracy and ease of maintenance. The actual accuracy difference between tightbore sizes is debatable and usually outweighed by bore consistency. Although, with the newfound popularity with HPA guns, the debate has been opened that barrels with a larger diameter (up to 6.13 mm or 0.241 in) could provide a more accurate shot. Due to the higher volume of air surrounding the pellet it negates the chance of the pellet coming into contact with the barrel, throwing the pellet's trajectory off, similar to a musket, in how the bullet slams about before leaving the barrel.

== Safety ==
Players in the 'offgame' or 'safe zone' between games

Airsoft guns are not to be confused with BB guns, which are airguns that shoot 4.5 mm (.177 in) metallic spherical pellets, unlike the plastic pellets shot by airsoft guns.

Many manufacturers and retailers suggest treating an airsoft gun like a real gun at all times. This will help alleviate safety issues resulting in an accidental/negligent discharge, or prevent a public panic due to a carelessly displayed airsoft gun being mistaken for a real firearm. Most manufacturers include an orange tip on the muzzle of the airsoft gun for signaling and safety purposes, and most retailers urge consumers not to remove the orange tip as it is used to help distinguish them from a real firearm. The orange tip serves many purposes, one of them being for law enforcement to help discern airsoft guns from real firearms and thus prevent unnecessary excessive forces.

The minimum safe level of gear required to participate in most games includes a pair of ANSI Z87.1 eye protection, preferably a fully sealed APEL-rated ballistic eyewear. Traditional prescription glasses and sunglasses, or goggles not rated sufficiently for impact-resistance, may shatter and/or be perforated upon being struck when used for airsoft or paintball, causing injury to the eye. Masks, face shields and other types of full-face coverings such as balaclavas are recommended at most airsoft fields.

=== Community safety precautions ===
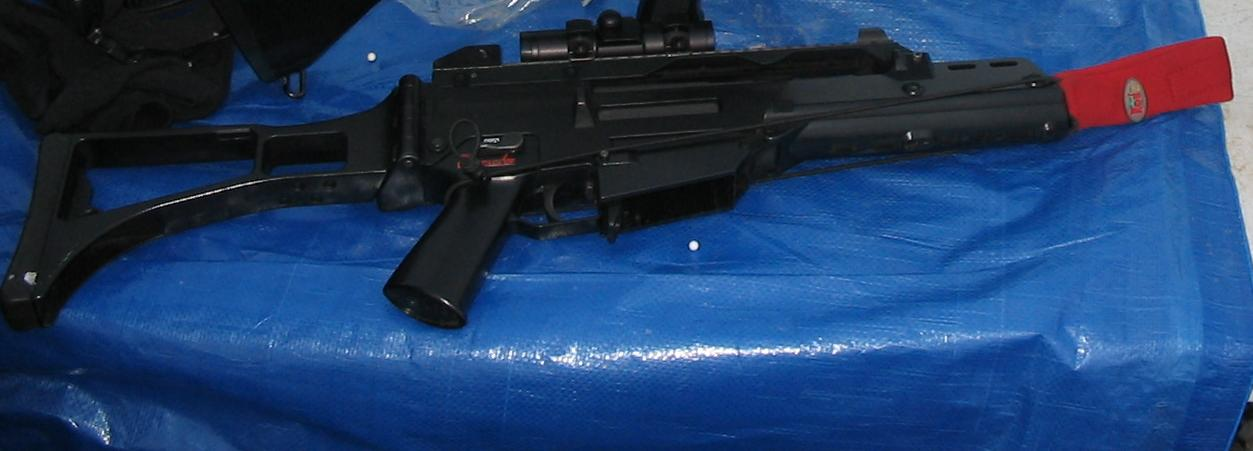
Airsoft replica of an H&K G36C. This replica is not in use on a field, and has the magazine removed, the chamber cleared, and a barrel bag placed over the muzzle.

Rules such as a maximum muzzle velocity and engagement distance guidelines are used by different groups. Some organizations have created common safety rules and guidelines. Most minimum engagement distances are 10 feet (3.0 m).

When not actively playing, some fields require "barrel bags", also known as barrel socks, barrel condoms, barrel blockers, or barrel sleeves, to be placed over the muzzle of the gun. The magazine is usually removed as well, and the gun fired to clear the chamber. Most fields also require players to leave their guns set to the safety position when they are not shooting, a practice common when using real firearms. In certain countries, such as the Philippines, additional special rules have been adopted.

Airsoft is also recommended to young adults or individuals who can use an airsoft gun responsibly. Some countries have legal age requirements for young shooters but these are mostly self-regulated than legally enforced. For example there is no legal age limit in the United States, but in contrast Sweden and Norway do not allow those below 18 years of age to purchase an airsoft gun. If you are a parent to a child who wants to start airsoft, check your local laws first.

== Legal restrictions ==
Airsoft is legal in most parts of the world. Some countries have specific restrictions, such as maximum muzzle velocity and "unrealistic" coloring to distinguish them from actual firearms. They are legal throughout the United States, but restrictions do exist in cities like Chicago and Detroit. The states of New Mexico, New York and New Jersey, however, do not allow airsoft guns to be used or handled publicly because of the resemblance to real firearms. They may be used on private property with the consent of the owner. The U.S. Customs and Border Protection FAQ page states that Airsoft guns are considered look-alike firearms which require the special blaze orange marking.

=== Ireland ===
In Ireland, Airsoft guns are classified as Realistic Imitation Firearms but not restricted as much as in the United Kingdom. Under the Criminal Justice Act of 2006, Airsoft guns are legal in the Republic. One can buy, sell and import Airsoft guns without notifying relevant law enforcement authorities. They do not need to be painted in fluorescent colours, they do not need to have an orange tip, but they cannot launch the projectile with a kinetic energy exceeding 1 joule. However, carrying an imitation firearm in public is prohibited, and a gun carry case is required, as for real firearms. Airsoft shops are spread over the country, and buyers must be aged 18 or over to purchase an airsoft gun. There is no age limit on Airsoft, as long as a minor has an adult's permission.

=== United Kingdom ===
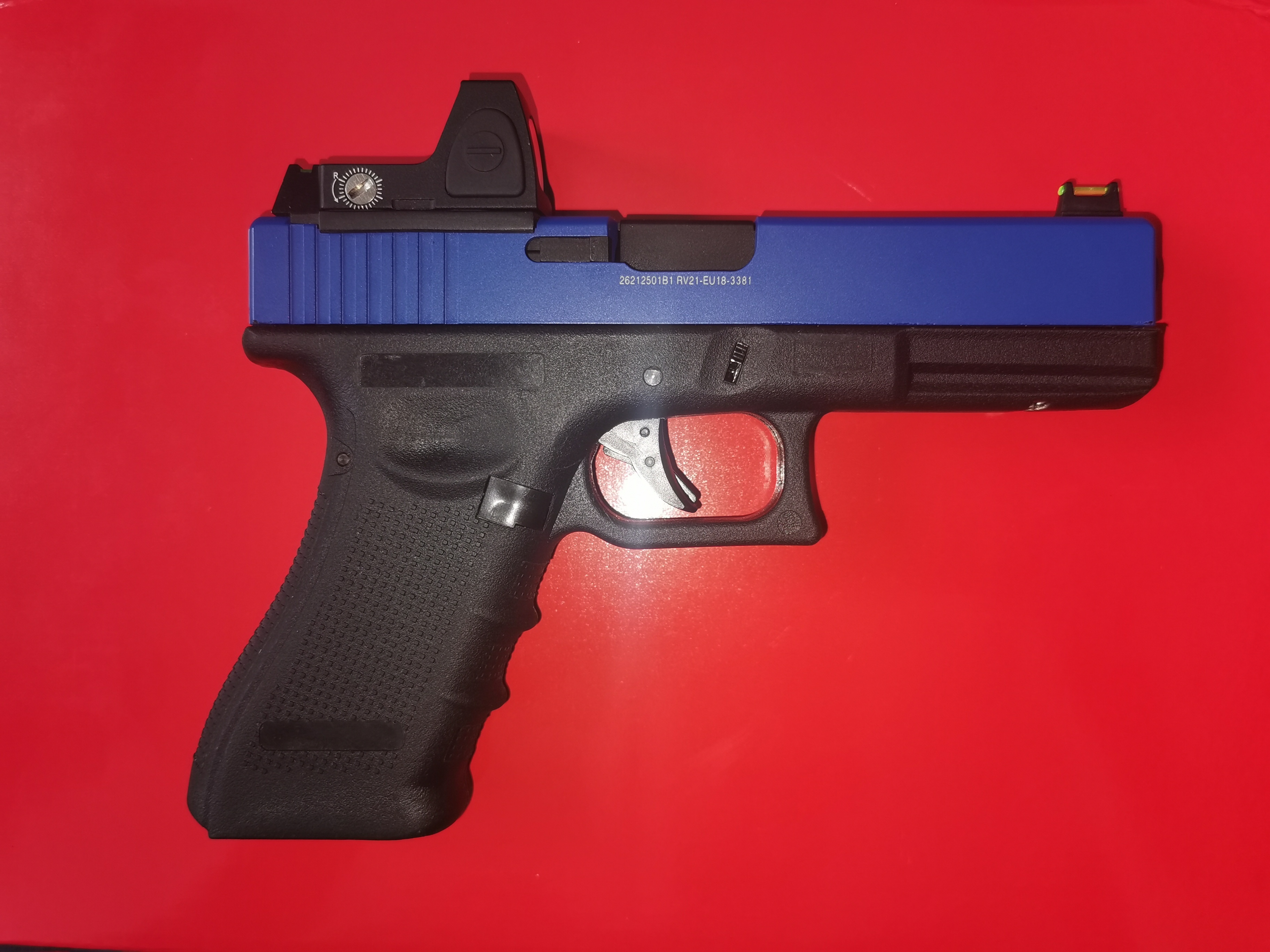
An example of an IF (Imitation Firearm) replica of the Glock 18c

In the United Kingdom, most Airsoft guns are classified as realistic imitation firearms or RIFs. The sale, manufacture, or importation (but not gifting) of these is illegal under the Violent Crime Reduction Act 2006. A defence is allowed for selling for specific purposes including airsoft skirmishing.

The minimum age for buying any imitation firearm in the UK is 18. It is an offence to possess an imitation firearm in a public place without a reasonable excuse, for example traveling to, or from, or being at an airsoft skirmish site.

Most UK airsoft sites and retailers participate in the United Kingdom Airsoft Retailer Association Ltd (UKARA) registration scheme. A player who has participated in at least 3 skirmishes over a period of at least 56 days at the same skirmish site can be registered by that site. Retailers have access to the database to verify that the purchaser can provide them with a defence. The Border Agency also has access to check legality of imports.

As an alternative to RIFs, IFs (Imitation Firearms, including 'two tones') are available in the UK. These are RIFs which have been painted a bright colour (excluding white/silver/gold) over at least 51% of the item. No specific defence is required for selling an IF, although the minimum age for purchasing remains 18.

=== Hong Kong & Japan ===
Hong Kong and Japan have strict laws governing the power and materials of airsoft guns. While many airsoft products are made in these jurisdictions and exported around the world, brands must ensure that products comply with local laws regardless of what the laws are like in the final destination. For airsoft guns manufactured and sold from Hong Kong, they must have total shooting energy below 2 joules, while Japanese regulations require airsoft guns to have total shooting energy below 0.98 joules. While there are not restrictions on materials used on airsoft guns in Hong Kong, Japan adds a further restriction that prohibits pistols from being constructed of full metal, though a metal slide combined with a plastic frame or vice versa is acceptable. Full metal rifles, however, are legal.

=== Canada ===
In Canada, there are laws pertaining to airsoft importing. All airsoft guns that are bought in Canada are legal, but when importing it, the gun has to have between 366FPS and 500FPS to pass inspection at customs, otherwise the gun will be shipped back or destroyed.

=== United States ===
Airsoft guns in the United States are sold with a federally mandated orange tip which must be 1/4 inch or longer covering the muzzle of the replica. Manufacturers and importers may cite Title 15 of the Code of Federal Regulations, which stipulates that "no person shall manufacture, enter into commerce, ship, transport, or receive any toy, look-alike, or imitation firearm" without approved markings; these may include an orange tip, orange barrel plug, brightly colored exterior of the whole toy, or transparent construction (part 272.2, formerly part 1150.2). However, section 272.1 (formerly 1150.1) clearly indicates that these restrictions shall not apply to "traditional B-B, paint-ball, or pellet-firing air guns that expel a projectile through the force of compressed air, compressed gas or mechanical spring action, or any combination thereof." This exempts airsoft guns from these requirements, placing them in the same category as BB-guns, pellet, air, and paintball, none of which are conventionally sold or used with an orange tip, and many of which bear as much resemblance to real firearms as airsoft guns do.

== Military and police training ==
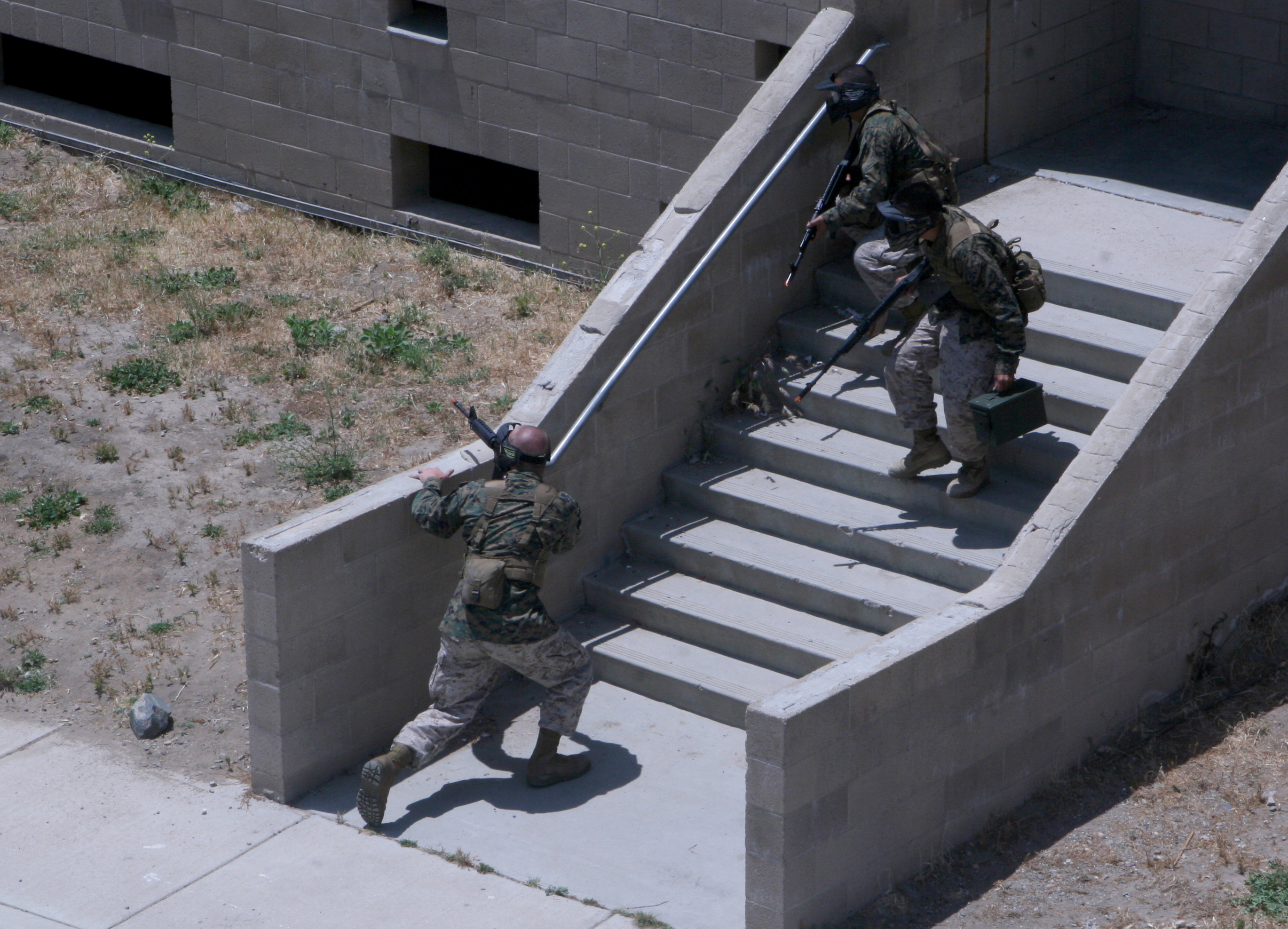
U.S. Marines during an airsoft match conducted for training at Marine Corps Base Camp Pendleton in 2009

Airsoft technology is used in military training and law enforcement training. Due to airsoft's realism, relatively safe projectiles, and economical ammunition, it is well-suited to war games and force-on-force scenarios to train and improve troop's tactical proficiency via associative learning and stress inoculation. Multiple airsoft inventions were developed originally for military and law enforcement use.

Marking rounds were invented by Kerry T. Bowden to allow trainees to see where each projectile landed. Much like paintball and simunitions, these marking pellets would break upon impact, marking the target with luminescent liquid. Unlike traditional plastic pellets, marking rounds are heavier to ensure breakage of the shell on impact. The weight can be adjusted by adding heavier liquid. Marking rounds are critical for trainees because they allow the shooter to see exactly where they hit the target. This allows them to extrapolate their mistakes and improve their aim.

Reusable grenades were improved by Scott Frank to emulate the fragmentation of a real grenade in war games and scenarios. The grenade can be loaded with paint or pellets. It uses a quick release of highly pressurized gas to break the shell and quickly disperse pellets or paint in all directions. Frank's grenade, although not the first, aimed to be as realistic and predictable as an actual grenade. He developed a more accurate timing mechanism and secondary safety mechanisms to prevent accidental discharge. Both marking rounds and reusable grenades gave airsoft the edge it needed to enter into military and law enforcement training grounds.

The airsoft guns used for training differ from civilian models. Guns manufactured for professional training are made to replicate the weight, feel and the sound of its real steel counterpart. In general, professional training airsoft guns are GBB models and enhanced with a weighted blowback mechanism to increase the force of the kick. Some are AEGs and are built with a blowback mechanism. They are also outfitted with muzzle protectors that amplify the sound to a decibel level comparable to that of a real firearm. The average FPS for professional training airsoft guns is higher than civilian models. Economically, airsoft is cheaper than simulation training. Benjamin Kratz, Fort Jackson's battalion executive officer, said that one blank M16 round can cost as much as 32 airsoft rounds. Airsoft can also be used in military simulations such as in malls or prisons to add to the immersion. There are different event producers like MiR Tactical holding these events.

== See also ==
- Airsoft gun
- Airsoft pellets
- BB gun
- Gel blaster
- IPSC Action Air
- Legal issues in airsoft
- Thunder-B (Airsoft grenade)
