= Project Reality =

Project Reality is a series of military tactical first-person shooter video game modifications that aim to create a realistic teamwork-based shooter centered around modern warfare and combined arms. The original version, Project Reality: BF2, was released in 2005 for Battlefield 2; this version is still being updated on a regular basis and became a stand-alone game in 2015. Project Reality: ARMA 2, a version developed for Arma 2, was released as a beta in 2011; development was later moved to Arma 3 in 2013, with the project being renamed to Project Reality: ARMA 3. In September 2015 it was announced that the Arma project had been suspended.

The team was founded by Noel Tock, aka Requiem, in 2004. In 2005, After launching a very basic initial 0.1 release known as Project Reality Mini Mod (PRMM), the team struggled to gain traction due to Electronic Arts adopting policies towards BF2 modifications that deterred players from engaging with mods. Later that year, Eamonn Glass, aka eggman51, took over day-to-day leadership of the team, driving all aspects of design, production and community engagement. By 2009, Project Reality received several awards, amassed a community of over 100,000 active players, and was the most played BF2 modification under Eamonn's leadership, introducing innovations in tactical team play gaming that helped to redefine the genre.

Squad is a spiritual successor to Project Reality.

== Project Reality: BF2 ==
Project Reality: BF2
- Developer: The Project Reality Team
- Publisher: The Project Reality Team
- Series: Battlefield
- Engine: Refractor 2
- Platform: Windows
- Release: PR Mini-mod: WW: July 8, 2005; PR 1.0: WW: August 2, 2013; PR 1.3 Stand-alone: WW: May 30, 2015; PR 1.9.0.0 Latest Update: WW: February 27, 2026
- Genre: Tactical first-person shooter
- Modes: Single-player, multiplayer

=== Gameplay ===
Project Reality features five game modes. Two of the most popular game modes are Advance and Secure, and Insurgency.

Advance and Secure involves capturing and holding control points, similar to the Conquest mode of Battlefield 2. However, in Advance and Secure, control points typically must be captured in a certain order, with both teams attacking and defending control points, though some Advance and Secure maps have one team attack and the other defend.

The second most popular game mode, Insurgency, is intended to simulate asymmetrical warfare. The Insurgency game mode involves a conventional forces team searching for and destroying hidden weapon caches while the other team, the insurgents, try to defend them.

The other game modes are Vehicle Warfare and Command and Control. The Vehicle Warfare mode differs by putting full emphasis on heavy vehicles and assets, and restricting the player to one kit role (crewman or pilot). The play style for Vehicle Warfare is otherwise identical to Advance and Secure where players must capture objective points in order. The Command and Control mode removes all control points. The objective instead is focused around player-built fortifications and their single Forward Operating Base (FOB). Players must build and defend their hidden FOB while also searching for the opposing forces' FOB. The mod also features a co-op mode, where human players may play alongside or against computer controlled players. Co-op can also serve as a single-player mode (with bots standing in for teammates).

In contrast to the original system of Battlefield 2, players may not spawn at their squad leader when they die, but must instead spawn at permanent spawn points such as main bases, or at temporary rally points created by the squad leader. Players may also spawn at FOBs which can be constructed if supply crates are delivered to the desired location. When constructed, other fixed defences such as stationary machine guns and various defensive constructs such as barbed wire or foxholes can be placed after the delivery of additional supplies.

The Insurgency game mode diverts slightly from these rules, limiting the insurgent side to spawn at their weapons caches which they must defend, or they lose the ability to spawn. The opposing team can discover the location of these caches by acquiring intelligence about the insurgents, after which an enemy cache will be marked on the conventional forces' map, indicating its position. However, insurgents can still deploy and construct destructible "hideouts" to spawn at, which act in a similar way to the FOBs in conventional game modes. The conventional forces are also able to construct their own FOBs for forward deployment.

Project Reality currently features 29 factions and over 70 maps, with more of each in development. Factions and maps depict multiple time periods, namely World War II (European eastern and western fronts), the Vietnam War, the Falklands War, the war on terror, Syrian Civil War and the present day.

== Project Reality: ARMA 2 ==
Project Reality: ARMA 2
- Developer: The Project Reality Team
- Publisher: The Project Reality Team
- Series: ARMA
- Engine: Real Virtuality 3
- Platform: Windows
- Release: Windows: WW: September 2, 2011
- Genre: Tactical first-person shooter
- Mode: Multiplayer

Project Reality: ARMA 2 exists as a standalone modification requiring both Arma 2 and Arma 2: Operation Arrowhead. It remains self-contained, self developing and does not rely on or use externally held add-ons from other sources where at all possible. What that means to the player is that it is a 'one stop shop' as an installation package, with no requirement for additional multiple add on packs.

Project Reality: ARMA 2 v0.1 BETA was released on September 2 which was shortly followed by the release of Project Reality: ARMA 2 v0.15 beta on March 16, 2012. A year later on March 1, 2013 0.16 version was released including two new terrains (maps). With the release came the news of a cease in development with the Arma 2 mod and a movement of efforts towards Arma 3.

== Successors ==
In early 2009 it was revealed through the official Project Reality forums that a standalone successor Project Reality 2 was in pre-production. A license for the C4 Engine has been purchased as of 2010.

An entry for a game called "Project Reality 2 - The Beaten Zone" has been posted to the official Crytek developers community crytek.net, stating that the game would be using the CryEngine 3. Project Reality staff have dismissed the supposed engine change as rumor, and did not acknowledge any connection to the crydev.net posting.

However, new announcements from the Dev Team, made sure that PR2 will be in fact using the CryEngine 3, since most of the people involved in the development of the game on the C4 Engine thought it wasn't so good to work with, and they have chosen the CryEngine 3 as their new engine to work on. There is no set release date for the game. Since 2014 there has been no more word from the team behind the standalone. One of the main developers also mentioned that the game's production had stopped.

On October 10, 2014 a team consisting of current and former Project Reality: BF2 developers announced a new commercial game based on the Project Reality gameplay formula. The new game is named Squad and is built on Unreal Engine 5. The game, as of December 2015, was available on Steam Early Access, and officially released on September 23, 2020. The game was initially funded through a crowdfunding campaign on Kickstarter.

== Reception ==
IGN and GameSpy have both reviewed Project Reality. IGN's review praised the mod, stating "all BF2 players should download this mod." GameSpy said that "the mother of all realism mods [has] arrive[d] for BF2". PC Zone also reviewed Project Reality, saying that "not only does it make the virtual warfare harsher, Project Reality also adds fantastic new maps, vehicles and weapons to the fray".

== See also ==
- Squad
- Forgotten Hope 2
