= Gun control in China =

Gun laws in China

In the People's Republic of China, access by the general public to firearms is subject to some of the strictest gun control measures in the world. With the exception of individuals with hunting permits and some ethnic minorities, civilian firearm ownership is restricted to non-individual entities.

Law enforcement, military, paramilitary, and security personnel are allowed to use firearms. Police are to use issued pistols only to stop serious or dangerous crimes.

Airsoft guns are practically prohibited in China, as muzzle energy limits classify them as real firearms.

== History ==
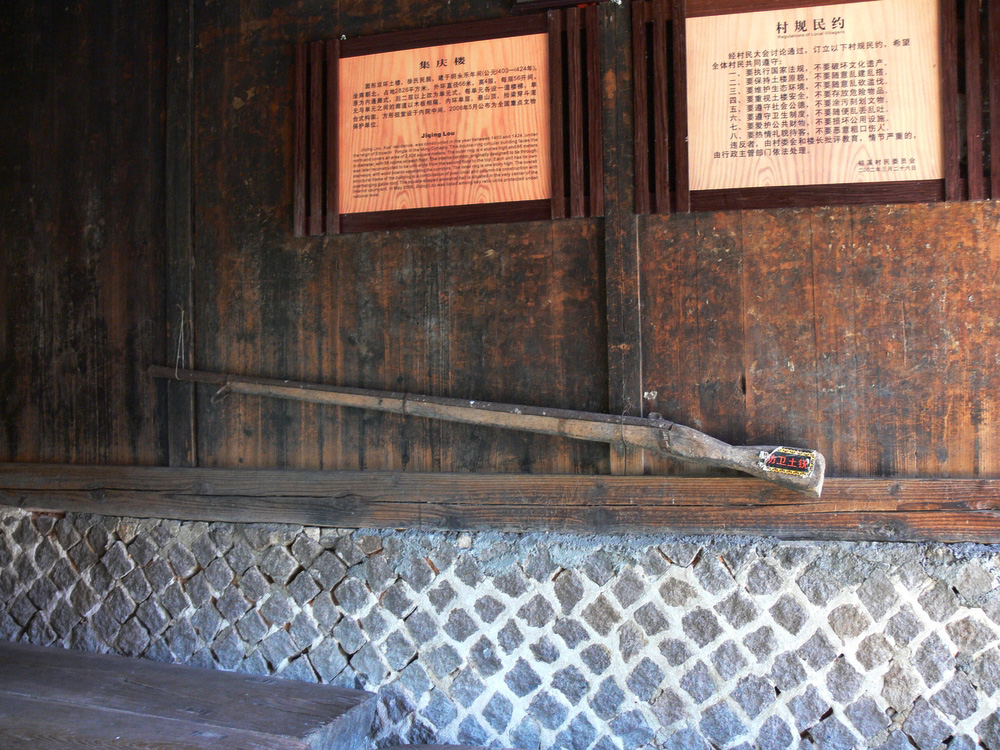
Rusted musket for defense against enemies inside a Hakka Fujian Tulou.

Gunpowder was invented in China more than a thousand years ago, with the first definitive written record of chemical formulae found in the mid-11th century Song dynasty military compendium Wujing Zongyao, and the very earliest possible reference dating to the Eastern Han dynasty. During the Ming and Qing dynasties, matchlock muskets were used in China, and the Chinese used the term "bird-gun" (Chinese: 鳥銃) to refer to muskets.

From the founding of the People's Republic of China in 1949, until the death of Mao Zedong in 1976, policy towards firearm possession was often class-specific, with rural peasants and urban proletarians being allowed to own firearms and form militias, while those considered class-enemies, such as landlords, were disarmed entirely. During the cultural revolution, PLA soldiers were tasked with training militiamen with a variety of weapons, including anti-tank guns. One of the first formal regulations on firearms was introduced in 1957 by The Security Administration Punishment Act, which established government permission as a prerequisite for the purchase, production, and possession of firearms. After the end of the cultural revolution, a new, formalized legal system was established as part of Deng Xiaoping's Opening Up and Reform policy; in 1979, The Criminal Law of the PRC, which included further regulations on firearms, was first promulgated. It wasn't until 1996, that civilian firearm possession and usage was further restricted to specific professions — hunters and competitive sport shooters in particular and only in their intended areas of use. According to the Chinese police, up until 2006, an underground gun-trading triangle in Southwest China fed the Chinese gun market, with guns being manufactured in Songtao and trafficked into Xiushan and Huayuan before reaching a national distribution scale.

According to official figures, from June to September 2006 (six-month crackdown) the Chinese authorities confiscated 178,000 illegal guns, 3,900 tons of explosives, 7.77 million detonators and 4.75 million bullets. In 2007, a study released by the Geneva-based Graduate Institute of International and Development Studies estimated that around 40 million guns were owned by Chinese civilians, a gross over-estimation according to Chinese analysts. Throughout the 2000s, The Wall Street Journal noted a rise of gun popularity in China.

== Specifications ==
In China, firearms can be used by law enforcement, the military and paramilitary, or security personnel protecting property of state importance (including the arms industry, financial institutions, storage of resources, and scientific research institutions).

Civilian ownership of firearms is largely restricted to non-individual entities such as sporting organizations, hunting reserves, and wildlife protection, management and research organizations. The chief exception to the general ban for individual gun ownership is for the purpose of hunting. Individuals who hold hunting permits can apply to purchase and hold firearms for the purpose of hunting. Illegal possession or sale of firearms may result in a minimum punishment of 3 years in prison, and the penalty for a gun crime is death penalty.

Airsoft guns are also practically prohibited due to the Ministry of Public Security dictating very restrictive new criteria that rendered most such toy guns being defined as real firearms, and violation may lead to a criminal conviction for illegal possession of firearms. Official media has discussed potential dangers of imitation guns (Chinese: 仿真枪).

== Special regions ==
=== Miao people ===
The possession of traditional smoothbore blackpowder muskets is allowed to some Miao hill people, the so-called Miao gun tribes, as an essential element of traditional dress and culture; however, possession of gunpowder is regulated.

The Biasha (Basha) Miao people (Chinese: 岜沙苗寨) living in Bingmei, Guizhou, claim they can legally possess guns, since they use them for their annual traditional performance.

=== Hong Kong and Macau ===
Firearm ownership in the special administrative regions of Hong Kong and Macau is tightly controlled and possession is mainly in the hands of law enforcement, military, or private security firms (providing protection for jewelers and banks). Still, possessing, manufacturing, importing, or exporting airsoft guns with a muzzle energy not above 2 joules (1.5 ft⋅lbf) is legal to citizens in China's SARs.

Firearms control was inherited during British and Portuguese rule and more or less retained today. Under the Section 13 of Cap 238 Firearms and Ammunition Ordinance of the Hong Kong law, unrestricted firearms and ammunition requires a license. Those found in possession without a license could be fined HKD$100,000 and imprisonment for up to 14 years.

== See also ==
- Estimated number of civilian guns per capita by country
- List of countries by firearm-related death rate
- Overview of gun laws by nation
