= Legal issues in airsoft =

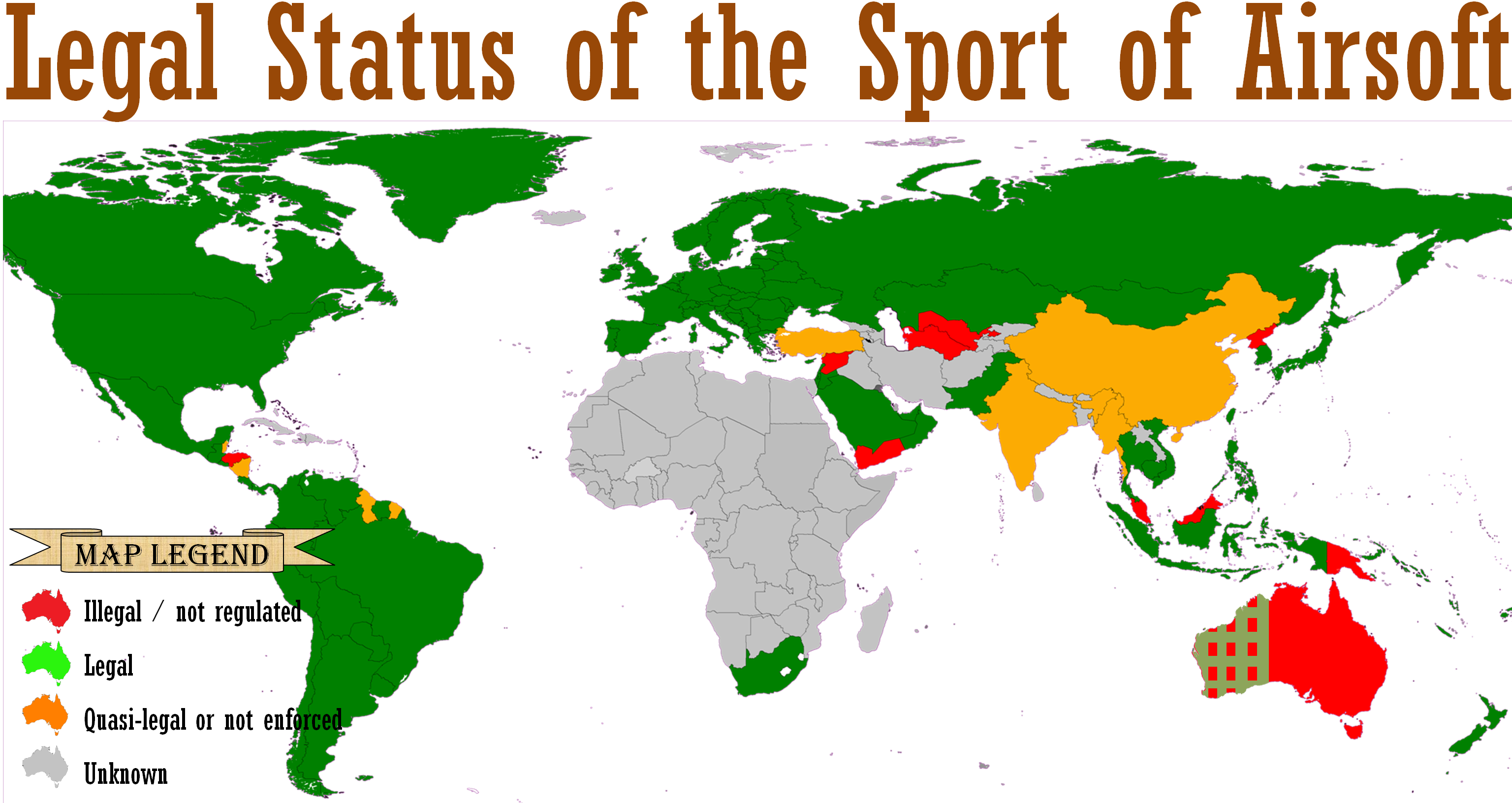
Legal status of airsoft by country

Airsoft is a sport in which players use airsoft guns to fire plastic projectiles at other players in order to eliminate them. Due to the often-realistic appearance of airsoft guns and their ability to fire projectiles at relatively high speeds, laws have been put in place in many countries to regulate both the sport of airsoft and the guns themselves. Safety regulations in many areas require an orange or red tip on the end of the barrel in order to distinguish the airsoft gun from a working firearm. They are officially classed as "soft air devices" or "air compressed toys", depending on the jurisdiction.

A handful of countries including Australia, Malaysia, Singapore and Vietnam have laws that are deemed to be airsoft-unfriendly.

== Australia ==
Importation of airsoft guns (referred officially as toy models by the Department of Immigration and Border Protection), regardless of their legal status by state, requires an Australian Customs B709 Importation of Firearms – Police Confirmation and Certification Form. These forms can be obtained from the relevant state's police department, however some states may require operators hold a valid license for the class of firearm wished to import before the forms will be issued. Due to the strict regulation of airsoft guns, gel blasters have become a popular alternative.

Possession and importation of airsoft weapons are banned outright in the states of Victoria, Queensland, South Australia, and Tasmania. Tasmania has also banned the game of airsoft, as well as paintball, stating that they are wargames.

=== Northern Territory ===
Airsoft firearms are legal to buy in the Northern Territory, provided one has the necessary licenses.

=== Australian Capital Territory ===
The Registrar of the Australian Capital Territory has a list of approved replica weapons and airsoft guns. Outside of the approved list, all airsoft guns that resemble semiautomatic or automatic military rifles or shotguns adapted for military purposes are considered prohibited weapons, as are imitations or replicas of any firearm.

== Austria ==
In Austria, airsofts are neither covered by the relevant weapons legislation nor are they considered toys and are therefore not subject to any technical restrictions. According to commercial regulations, the sale and distribution of airsofts is only permitted for persons over the age of 18. In 4 of the 9 federal states, airsofts resembling real weapons are classified as objects harmful to minors, meaning there minors are prohibited from operating them.

== Argentina ==
In Argentina, airsoft guns can be bought and used by anyone over the age of 18, however the import, sale and manufacture of replica guns requires a permit by federal law 26.216.

== Armenia ==
Airsoft guns with muzzle energy below three joules (a muzzle velocity of 173.2 m/s or 568 fps for a 0.20 g projectile) are legal. They are not considered weapons and do not require any licenses or permissions to buy.

== Belgium ==
In Belgium, weapons that launch a projectile without the use of gunpowder are unrestricted for people over the age of 18 as long as the weapon is longer than 60 cm, has a barrel longer than 30 cm, and a muzzle energy less than 7.5 joules (J).

Commercial sales, imports, and exports may be done only by licensed firearms dealers. Non-commercial sales or owner transfers can be done by anyone aged 18 years or older.

All events must take place in private locations with the prior notification and permission of the local governing body and law enforcement. Airsoft organizations are prohibited from maintaining affiliation with ideological or religious agendas. In the Flemish region, when organizing more than two times per year, an environment permit must be acquired. When organizing in a designated forest area, permission from the regional forest agency is needed. In the Walloon area in general it is sufficient to inform the local authorities.

Strict environmental laws mandate the exclusive use of bio-degradable BBs.

== Brazil ==
Airsoft is a very recent shooting sport in Brazil. In the past, due to lack of regulation, airsoft was usually misinterpreted as a firearm clone or replica. Nowadays, airsoft is legal but there are strong restrictions. Based on the current minutes that have gone public, airsoft guns are not considered firearms, but they are still considered controlled items. To import them, it is necessary to pay import taxes of 60% of the value of the product including freight, plus about 150 reais (around 50 US dollars) in administrative fees. It is also necessary before importing any weapon or weapon accessory to submit an application for a CII (International Import Certificate) to the Brazilian Army, containing the data of the equipment being imported, the location of the airport or port of departure in the country of foreign and in the national arrival, store and buyer data and product values. A response to the application can take up to three months, and the response must be sent to the seller to attach to the outside of the merchandise. If it does not have a CII when the merchandise arrives in the country it will be confiscated. This bureaucracy causes a delay in the domestic market with the international market, it also causes the lack of use of low prices abroad and as Brazil has high-interest rates (along with import taxes) the product often comes to triple the price. No guns need transportation permits after import.

People under 9 are not allowed to buy airsoft guns and commercial entities and importers are obliged to retain documentation of airsoft buyers for five years. An orange or red tip is required in order to differentiate them from firearms. There are still strong restrictions on importing accessories such as holographic sights, red dot sights, and magazines, which require a CII and are subject to administrative taxes.

Airsoft is expensive in Brazil, as it costs almost as much as a real firearm in the US. However, the sport has grown quite large due to YouTubers and is estimated to have almost 100,000 participants as of 14 November 2017. Due to high import rates, the Brazilian market is loaded with cheap weapons of entry-level brands like CYMA, JG, King Arms, Cybergun, and Umarex. The airsoft community adopts projectile speed limits but there is no law that requires them. The typical limits are:

- Assault rifles: 400 feet per second (fps)
- Semi-automatic sniper rifles (M110 SASS, PSG-1, etc.): 500 fps and no shooting within 15 m, mandatory secondary up to 400 fps
- Sniper rifles: 550 fps and no shooting within 15 m, mandatory secondary up to 400 fps
- Designated marksman rifles (DMR): 450 fps and no shooting within 15 m, mandatory secondary up to 400 fps

== Bulgaria ==
Airsoft is a legal sport in Bulgaria and there are no restrictions placed on the guns apart from parents' permission for people under 18. As airsoft guns are considered air guns by Bulgarian law, no documents or licenses are needed to possess them. There are no restrictions about lasers or flashlights. Moreover, there is no need for the end of the barrel to be painted in orange (like in the United States). There are neither restrictions on the power of air and airsoft guns (although there are official rules enforced by individual airsoft fields or by Airsoft Sofia in games that they organize) nor on carrying them in public areas, although it is highly inadvisable to carry replica firearms in public places outside of a carrying case or appropriate backpack. This rule is unofficially enforced by the Airsoft Sofia organisation and is punishable by a temporary or permanent ban from official games, as it creates unwanted friction between players and the authorities and public.

Shooting in protected areas, which include schools, administrative buildings, public property, and public areas is forbidden. Private regulated land must obtain an urban planning application or consent to make it public land before starting a paintball field with an internal boundary of 3 m. Many airsoft participants in Bulgaria have their own field rules which usually include being 18 years of age, but there are some exceptions.

== Canada ==
Airsoft guns that are not replicas of real weapons are neither illegal nor heavily restricted in Canada. Under the Canadian Firearms Program, airsoft guns resembling with near precision an existing make and model of an arm, other than an antique arm, and with a muzzle velocity below 152.4 m/s (500 ft/s), are considered replica arms and therefore are prohibited devices. Models resembling antique arms may be allowed. Generally, antique arms are those manufactured before 1898. Individuals may keep replica guns they owned on 1 December 1998 and no license is required, however the import or acquisition of replica firearms is prohibited. If the replica firearm is taken out of Canada it will not be allowed back in.

Non-replica air guns with a muzzle velocity between 111.6 m/s (366 ft/s) and 152.4 m/s (500 ft/s) or a maximum muzzle energy of 5.7 J (4.2 ft⋅lb) are exempt from licensing, registration, and other requirements; and from penalties for possessing an arm without a valid license or registration certificate. All replicas regardless of muzzle velocity are considered firearms under the Criminal Code if used to commit a crime. Airsoft guns that exceed both the maximum velocity and maximum muzzle energy are subject to the same licence, registration, and safe handling requirements that apply to conventional firearms. An airsoft gun may be imported if it meets the required markings. An airsoft gun that is obviously a child's toy (e.g. made out of clear plastic or at a drastically different scale) and fires only very light pellets (less than 2 g) no faster than 152.4 m/s (500 ft/s) would not be classified as a firearm under the Canadian Firearms Act. A brightly coloured tip (or the absence of such) has no bearing on the legality of an airsoft firearm.

In Manitoba, Saskatchewan, Ontario, British Columbia, and Quebec, the minimum age to purchase an airsoft gun is 18. Regardless, most (if not all) airsoft stores will refuse to sell airsoft guns to anyone who is underage. Children under that age are still able to use airsoft guns but only if supervised by someone over 18.

International retailers may sell Canadian-ready guns, or offer services to make them meet Canada's import requirements. Depending on the type of airsoft gun, this involves installing an extended inner barrel or a stiffer spring.

=== Bill C-21 ===
Over the course of 2021 and 2023, there was a failed attempt to ban airsoft replicas in Canada.

On February 16, 2021, Bill C-21 was introduced. Among other things, the bill also proposed to change the Criminal Code to prohibit airsoft guns (known as uncontrolled firearms or "mid velocity replicas"). Under Bill C-21, any device which fired under 500 ft/s (150 m/s) and exactly resembled a regulated firearm would automatically be classed as a "replica" and would therefore be prohibited. As a result, virtually all airsoft guns would be considered illegal under this proposal and could not be imported, sold or transferred without special authorization. Current owners would have been able to keep their replicas but could not transfer them to anyone else. The prohibition was tabled in response to a request from the Canadian Association of Chiefs of Police with claims that unregulated mid-velocity replicas are used in crime and that they complicate police work due to them being indistinguishable from a real firearm.

The proposed airsoft ban received widespread disapproval from all parties, including some low-ranking members of the governing Liberal Party itself. The Conservative Party of Canada and the New Democratic Party, along with at least 2 Liberals shortly after the bill was announced, expressed opposition to this section of the bill, recognizing airsoft as a safe recreational activity. They were also critical of the bill's hardline approach, claiming a total ban was excessive and would not have any impact on lowering actual gun crime. Jack Harris of the NDP has stated "Banning of airsoft rifles is putting them in the same category as prohibited weapons and that is wrong." Shannon Stubbs stated "The Liberals are actually imposing a ban on airsoft and a partial ban on paintball. Any rational common sense person can see that toy guns are not responsible for shootings causing deaths in Canadian cities."

The provision banning replicas firing under at a velocity of under 500 ft/s (150 m/s) was eventually removed in committee.

== Chile ==
Chile recognized airsoft as a legal sport activity under Exempt Resolution No. 245 of 20 January 2011 by the National Institute of Sports.

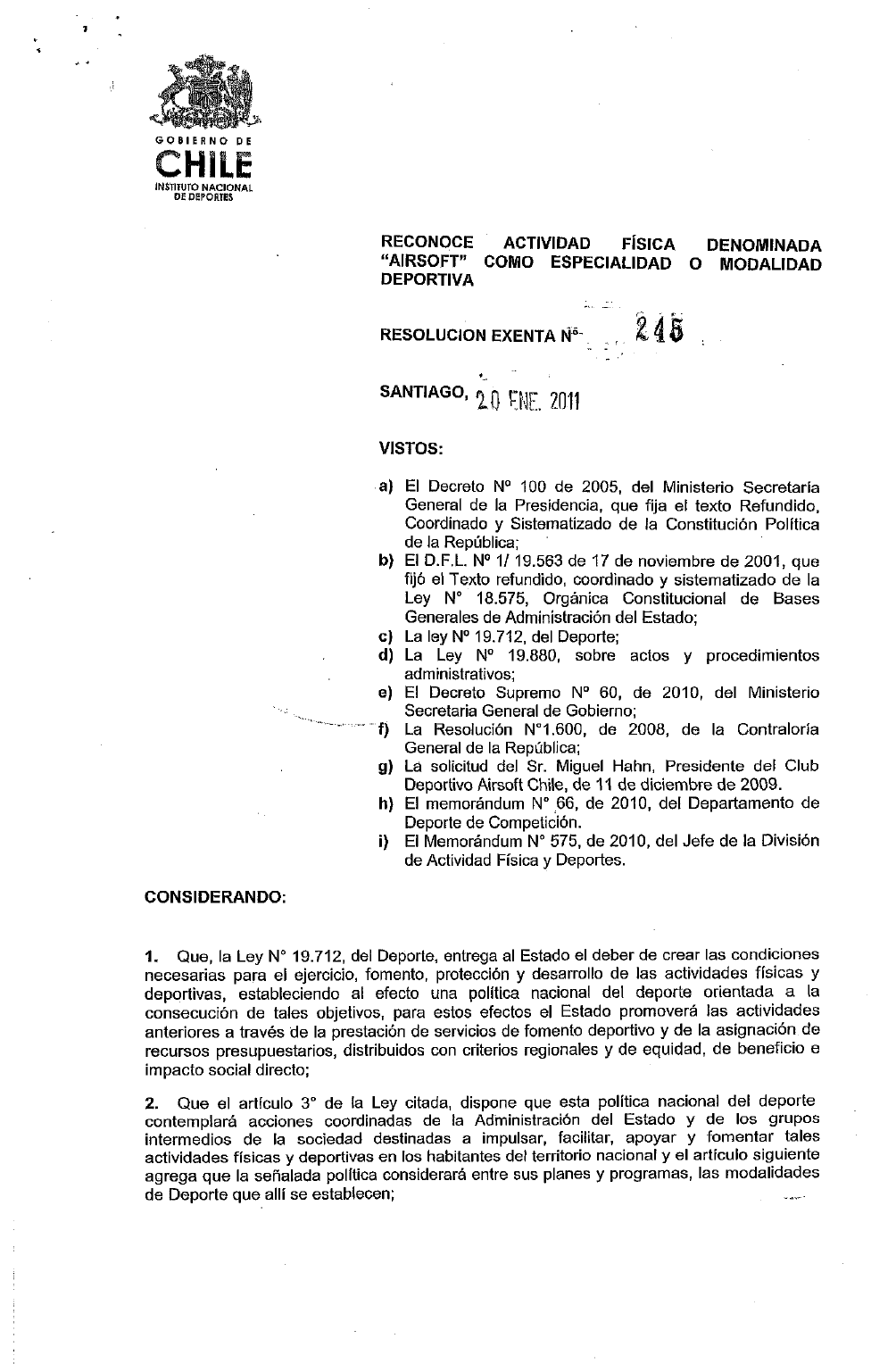
Exempt Resolution No. 245. IND. Page 1.

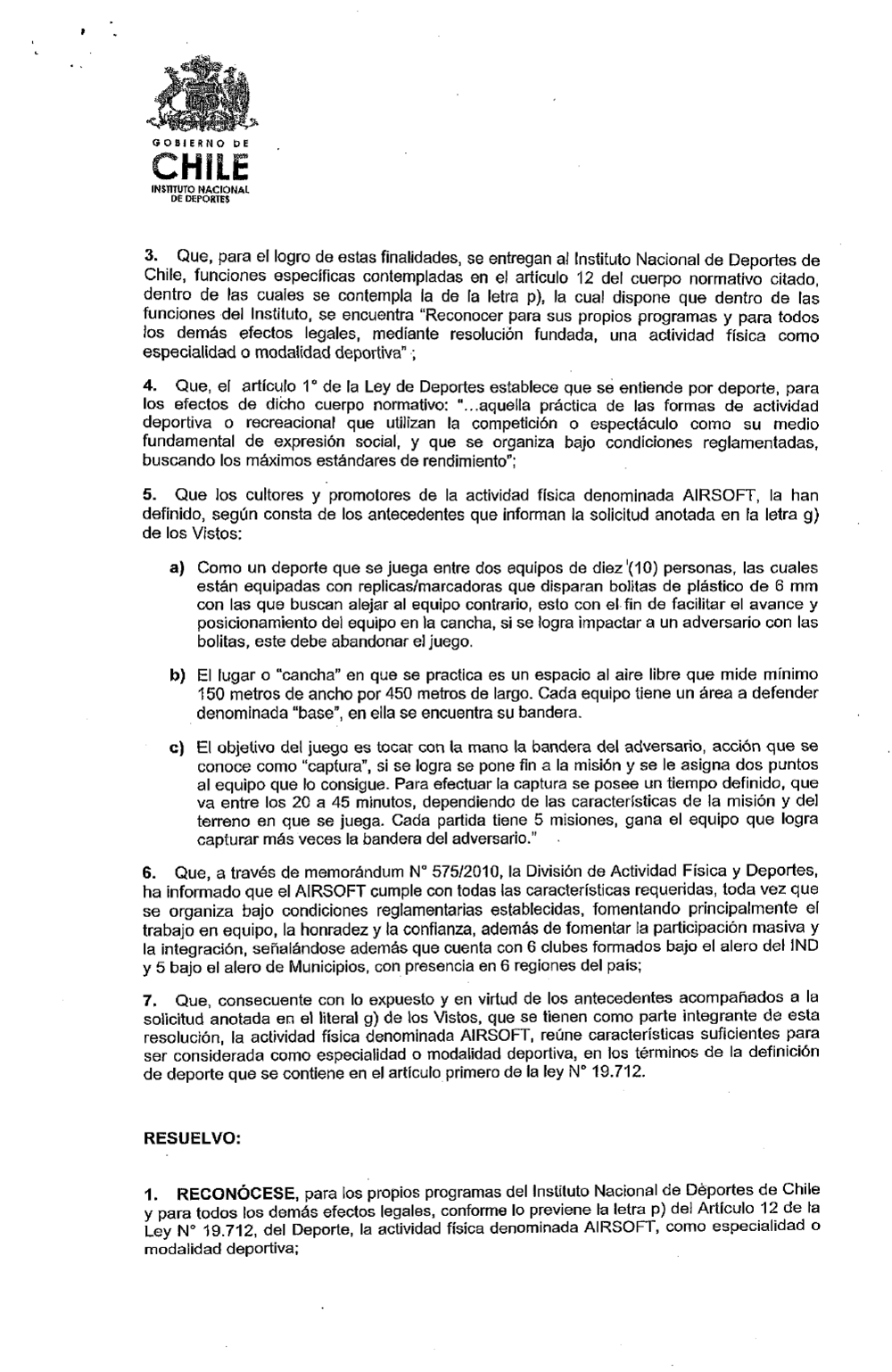
Exempt Resolution No. 245. IND. Page 2.

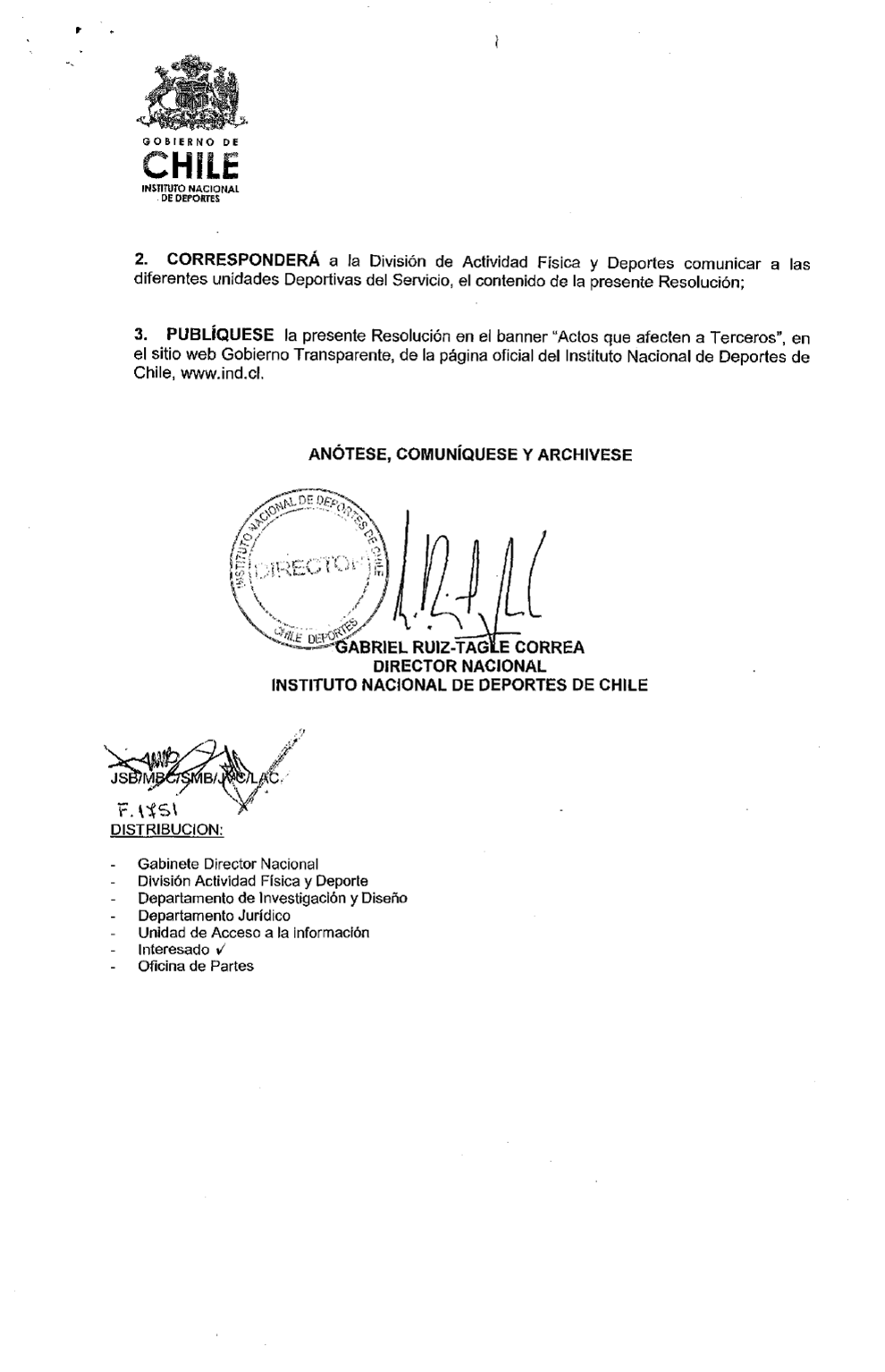
Exempt Resolution No. 245. IND. Page 3.

Although airsoft replicas are not clearly regulated under Chilean gun law, modifying toy guns to use real ammunition and carrying an unconcealed weapon in a public area is illegal and punishable by law. There is currently no law that restricts who may acquire or use an airsoft gun. However, stores and sport clubs usually only permit their use or acquisition by individuals that are 18 years old or older.

== China ==
In the People's Republic of China, despite the common belief that airsoft is outright banned, the official stance on airsoft is that it is technically just "tightly controlled". However, the control standards are so strict and the punishments are so heavy-handed, that involvement in the sport (regarded as a wargame or "live action CS") is considered too impractical for common individuals in mainland China.

According to the "Identification Standards of Imitation Guns" (仿真枪认定标准) dictated by the Ministry of Public Security (the central coordinating agency of the Chinese police system) in 2008, a replica (imitation) gun is recognized according to any one of the following criteria:

1. Fulfills the firearm component parts stipulated by the Law of the People's Republic of China on Control of Guns, and shoots pellets of metal or other materials with a muzzle-ratio kinetic energy (MRKE; Chinese: 枪口比动能, the muzzle energy of a projectile divided by the internal cross sectional area of the barrel that fired it) between 0.16 and 1.8 J/cm^{2} (equivalent to a single 0.20 g, 6 mm airsoft pellet shot at a muzzle velocity of 21.3 to 71.3 m/s or 70 to 234 fps, or 0.045 to 0.51 J);
2. Has external features of a firearm, as well as barrel, trigger, receiver or action mechanisms that are either materially or functionally similar to a service firearm;
3. Has the same or similar shape and color, and a size between 50 and 100% (later amended to "50 and 200%" in 2011) of the corresponding real service firearm.

If a replica exceeds any single criterion, it will no longer be categorized as a replica or toy gun, but rather considered a real weapon, and therefore illegal to purchase and possess. Offenders may be judged as arms traffickers and subjected to penalties as severe as capital punishment and life imprisonment.

Prior to the Beijing Olympics, airsoft was an increasingly popular sport among Chinese military enthusiasts. However, since the 2008 standards came out, there have been thousands of arrests and seizures made on toy gun merchants and consumers for arms trafficking and illegal possession of firearms, because people are often unaware that their hobbies are illegal under the new standards, and the Ministry of Public Security or police never actively informed the public about the change. Law enforcement is also highly arbitrary, and many of the items confiscated are actually either non-functional props or well below the replica limit. This is also compounded by moral panics from the mass media and parent groups who exaggerate the safety threat posed by these toys. Such examples include confusing the definition of airsoft guns with far more powerful air guns, arguments that airsoft weapons can be easily modified to shoot more lethal projectiles or even converted into real firearms, or citing demonstrations of airsoft guns penetrating paper targets at point-blank range, all appealing for a blanket ban on replica toys out of concerns for child safety.

Despite the restrictions against the sport, many people (even police officers) still take risks to acquire airsoft replicas (often bought from Hong Kong, then smuggled back into the Mainland via Shenzhen). To avoid the government tracing online, various underground airsoft community forums often refer the commonly seen battery-powered automatic airsoft guns as "electric dogs" (Chinese: 电狗; pinyin: Diàn Gǒu, playing a joking near-homophone on the English word "gun") or "pets" (宠物; Chǒng Wù). Alternative MilSim activities using gel ball shooters (similar to Xploderz) or foam dart shooters (similar to Hasbro's Nerf Blaster) as replacements have also become increasingly popular.

There have also been debates in the blogosphere against the official 1.8 J/cm^{2} definition, since the pre-2008 Chinese criteria defined that a minimal MRKE of 16 J/cm^{2} was needed to breach human skin at close range and hence qualifiable as a real firearm – nine times higher than the current standards. In comparison, the maximum MRKE allowed for replica guns is 7.077 J/cm^{2} in Hong Kong, 20 J/cm^{2} in Taiwan, and 3.2 J/cm^{2} in Japan, while most other countries like Germany and the US have a limit of up to 78.5 J/cm^{2} (though with restrictions on minimal engagement distances). Some netizens even accused legislators and law enforcement of procrastination and corruption, arguing it is much more convenient for police officers to seek commendations and promotions by picking on soft targets such as toy gun owners rather than risking violence to confront threatening criminals. This sentiment was often reinforced by reports of selective enforcement, where offenders of certain backgrounds (foreign nationals, ethnic minorities, political and social elites and associates) were given significantly lighter penalties than other citizens. Some legal academics and lawyers have also pointed out that the Ministry of Public Security, which solely dictated the above-mentioned definitions of real guns and replicas, is a law enforcement body but not a legislative one, and thus has no jurisdiction in defining legal standards, meaning that the current replica gun standard is unconstitutional.

== Croatia ==
Airsoft replicas fall into the D category of weapons, and to buy one users must be at least 14 years old. The maximum muzzle velocities allowed by the Croatian Airsoft Federation for various categories of rifles are:

- Automatic electric gun (AEG): 1.49 J – maximum 1.56 J
- Machine gun: 1.49 J – max 1.56 J
- DMR: 2.32 J – max 2.42 J (the minimum allowed range of action is 20 m)
- Bolt action: 3.34 J – max 3.46 J (the minimum allowed range of action is 30 m)

Shooting replicas in automatic or burst mode in enclosed spaces is allowed if the replicas do not have a kinetic energy greater than 0.84 J, and such replicas are reported to the organizers, and used as directed and at their discretion.

Only replicas which are in reality DMRs can be used, any other conversions are not allowed AK or M4 ff. DMR replicas, which are not mechanically able to switch to automatic fire cannot be used at events.

== Czech Republic ==
Airsoft guns are regulated same as other air guns in the Czech Republic. Anyone older than 18 can acquire, keep and bear airsoft firearms. Carrying in public places is possible only in concealed manner.

== Denmark ==
Airsoft guns are mentioned as exempt in the Danish Våbenlov (arms control legislation). Persons have to be at least 18 years old to buy, transfer, or possess airsoft guns. They may be used on police-approved sites, with a permission slip, at the age of 16. A firearms certificate is not required. All airsoft guns have to be transported in a concealed manner, such as in a bag or in a trunk.

== Egypt ==
Airsoft guns are legal to own and possess in Egypt, and they are sold by some weapon stores. Civilians cannot import or order airsoft weapons; only weapon stores can import them as air guns. Some low-quality, plastic, and unbranded airsoft spring guns may be found in toy stores or gift stores, and are popular during Ramadan, Eid al-Fitr, and Eid al-Adha.

Currently, civilians interested in the sport are appealing to the Egyptian government to allow the import and ownership of airsoft guns.

== Estonia ==
The law does not mention or recognize airsoft guns in detail but sets restrictions on the public carry of firearm replicas. While the current firearm law would classify airsoft guns as air guns, it also sets restrictions for air guns to not exceed 4.5 mm diameter pellets (.177 caliber), making 6 mm BBs de jure illegal. Despite the laws being unclear, the sport is practiced widely without issues. Customs regulations allow import without any limitations, local law enforcement is aware of public sales and organized events, and the military has acquired airsoft guns for urban and close-quarters combat training. Airsoft rules for 2020 have been established by the Estonian Airsoft Association (Estonian: Eesti Airsofti Liit MTÜ). Eye protection must be worn at all times when using airsoft guns. Grenades must have a CE certificate and cannot be self-made. The muzzle energy and minimum engagement distances by gun type are:

- Pistols and shotguns up to 1.2 J; Minimum engagement distance 3 m
- Assault rifles (ARs) and submachine guns up to 1.6 J; Minimum engagement distance 10 m
- Single shot ARs, machine guns, and light machine guns up to 2.5 J; Minimum engagement distance 25 m
- Bolt action sniper rifles up to 3.5 J; Minimum engagement distance 30 m

Minors are allowed in games if they have parent or guardian written permission and contact information. Minors can buy and own airsoft replicas. When purchasing airsoft replicas as a minor, a parent or guardian must be present. People over the age of 18 have no restrictions when buying or owning guns, or participating in games.

== Finland ==
Airsoft guns are not treated as firearms by law, but visible transportation of any replica firearms in public areas is forbidden. All replica firearms must be covered with something, for example, a firearm case, when in public areas. The land owner's permission is needed to play airsoft in any area.

Jokamiehenoikeus (lit. 'everyman's right') rights do not apply to airsoft, and cannot be used as a basis to play in government forests.

Minors (under the age of 18) are able to purchase airsoft guns only with written permission from their legal guardians.

== France ==
Visible transportation of replica firearms in public areas is forbidden. They must be covered with something like a firearm case. The land owner's permission is needed to play airsoft in any area. An orange marking on the tip is unneeded.

Minors (under 18) can only buy airsoft guns that are under 0.08 J in power. Airsoft guns may only have a muzzle energy under 2 J (464 fps with 0.2g BBs), otherwise they are no longer qualified as airsoft replicas but firearms, and owners must follow the French weapons law (dated 2013).

== Germany ==
Airsoft guns under 0,5J are deemed toy guns and can be used by all people above the age of 14. Some shops require a legal guardian to be present and give permission when buying such guns, however most shops sell them to anybody above the age of 14. In addition, they must not be carried in public as they can resemble firearms. Airsoft guns with a muzzle energy between 0.5 and 7.5 J are treated as air rifles, and the minimum age for purchasing or using them is 18 years. These guns need a special marking, the so-called "F in a pentagon", and must be incapable of fully automatic fire, otherwise they are illegal to possess.

The trade and possession of airsoft guns is otherwise mainly unrestricted, but transportation is permitted only in a closed container. Transportation of toys that resemble weapons requires a locked container. The shoot or ready access port is permitted only on closed private property and if this does not disturb other people.

In Germany, the possession of lasers and flashlights mounted on airsoft guns is illegal. The possession of a device that is intended to be mounted on a gun and project light in any form in front of the muzzle is illegal.

== Greece ==
Airsoft is basically an underground sport in Greece because the law is unclear. According to the law, airsoft guns fall into the same general category as air guns, which are not real firearms, and are free to be purchased from specialized shops. It is prohibited to have any replica gun in public. This is treated similarly to illegal possession of real firearms.

== Hong Kong ==
In Hong Kong, airsoft guns are considered toys as long as they have a muzzle energy below 2 J, above which they are considered firearms and need registration; possession of an unregistered firearm is illegal. Under Section 13 of Cap 238 Firearms and Ammunition Ordinance of the Hong Kong Law, unrestricted use of firearms and ammunition requires a license. Those found in possession without a license could be fined HK$100,000 and be imprisoned for up to 14 years.

Airsoft guns in Hong Kong are not required to have an orange tip. However, public possession or exposure of airsoft guns is not recommended by the Hong Kong police, as it is difficult to identify whether it is a real firearm or not. A licence is not required to sell airsoft guns.

== Hungary ==
In Hungary the law classifies airsoft guns as air guns. They can be purchased from the age of 18 without any license, however owning an airsoft gun is legal from the age of 14. Airsoft games require a minimum age of 14 with parental supervision, a minimum age of 16 with parental approval, and can be freely played over the age of 18. Airsoft guns may not be visible while carrying them in public (it is also strongly recommended not to wear any tactical gear in public).

== Indonesia ==
In Indonesia, there are no strict rules about airsoft and there has been no consideration by the government as to whether airsoft guns are treated as toys or are equal to real guns. However, when airsoft was first brought to Indonesia in 1996, the founders of Indonesian airsoft communities put some restrictions on airsoft games. For example, airsoft players are encouraged not to upgrade their guns above 450 fps, or they will be rejected from the community. Moreover, anyone who wants to buy an airsoft gun must be at least 18 years old and know the regulations and rules about airsoft guns.

Some events have occurred that are perceived as endangering the continuity of the hobby, such as some robberies in which airsoft replicas were used. Therefore, in order to control its growth, there is a government-authorized club called Perbakin (Indonesian Shooting Club) which is currently appointed by police to accommodate airsoft as a new sport. Other authorized clubs that exist in Indonesia to accommodate airsoft and its users include the Persatuan Olahraga Airsoft Seluruh Indonesia (PORGASI), the Airsoft Brotherhood Unity (ABU), and the Indonesian Airsoft Federation (FAI).

In the beginning of 2013, the police and people from the airsoft communities exchanged words and were negotiating to legalize the sport provided the players make their guns (AEGs or GBBs) distinctive from real firearms through the use of orange tipped muzzle brakes.

== India ==
Airsoft is an unrecognized sporting activity in India. Officially, mention of this sport does not exist in Indian sports guidelines, laws or documents. Therefore, it does not come under any legal category of sports or recreational activities.

India does not have an airsoft manufacturing sector and all materials for the activity must be obtained through imports. Since the Indian Customs services and the government are not aware of the existence of the sport or the nature of the equipment used, imports may be seized due to their resemblance to firearms. Inclusion of these items under the toy category rarely happens due to lack of awareness. There is also the risk of incorrect classification under a prohibited air gun caliber since a maximum of .177 cal is allowed for conditional civilian import into India. Detained items may be destroyed or sent for lab tests depending on the situation, with long waiting periods to obtain results.

Another aspect of non-recognition is the pseudo-legal nature of the activity. This has resulted in a thriving black market where entry level equipment is sold above premium prices with active support from corrupt authorities.

This does not mean that airsoft as a sport does not happen in India. It is unorganized and at a much smaller scale than in developed countries.

There are also recognized airsoft communities in India such as the Airsoft Sporting Community of India (ASCI).

== Ireland ==
The status of airsoft in Ireland was changed after the 2006 Criminal Justice Act, which amended the previous Firearms Acts. While previously authorisation or a license was required for all devices which fired a projectile from a barrel, the law now defines a firearm as (amongst other things):

an air gun (including an air rifle and air pistol) with a muzzle energy greater than one joule of kinetic energy or any other firearm incorporating a barrel from which any projectile can be discharged with such a muzzle energy.

The aim of this change was to establish a firearms classification that eliminates the legal oddity of suction cup dart guns and similar toys being legally classified as firearms, thus bringing Ireland into line with the rest of the EU. In this case, one joule was used as the limit, as opposed to 7 J in Germany and 16.2 J in the UK. The one-joule limit most likely arose from UK case law where it was found that energies in excess of one joule were required to penetrate an eyeball (thus causing serious injury). As a result, airsoft devices under one joule of power have been declassified and have become legal to possess and use. No airsoft sites allow players to use devices that exceed the limit.

== Israel ==
Airsoft guns are classified as "dangerous toys" in Israel which limits the import, manufacture and sale of airsoft guns to licensed retailers only. Due to the fact that this law is not related to criminal acts, thus not being very well enforced until the year 2010, it was possible to find private retailers who imported MPEG and AEG-level airsoft guns. Currently, purchase of airsoft guns of all levels is possible only through one or two licensed retailers.

Israeli airsoft players have created associations in an attempt to make airsoft legal, such as Girit (Hebrew: גירית: עמותת איירסופט לישראל, lit. 'Girit: Israel Airsoft Association') and the ASI (Hebrew: עמותת סטרייקבול ישראלית, lit. 'Israeli Strikeball Association'). Girit is cooperating with the Israeli Shooting Federation, joining it shortly as a member and cooperating with other governmental authorities to legalize airsoft.

Girit has established cooperation with USPSA, Ukrainian, Slovenian, Swedish, and Czech airsoft players. An Israeli national airsoft tactical shooting competition took place near Beit Berel in March 2007.

In July 2010, the Israeli airsoft associations finished negotiations with the Israeli government. Since then, every association (or Tacticball Club) member can carry airsoft gear, guns, and parts at home. Also transportation and carrying of airsoft guns may only be done if the tip of the barrel is painted red or orange.

== Italy ==
Airsoft guns and pistols are allowed a muzzle energy equal or less than one joule. Under the law, airsoft guns are not classified as firearms, but as toys. One can buy and sell them both from stores and from another private citizen, either domestically or from abroad. Internet purchasing and mail shipping is legal and unrestricted. No license or registration is required. There is no mandatory minimum age to purchase airsoft and use it. The Italian Ministry of Interior only recommends that their sale be restricted to people over the age of 18 or 14 if accompanied by a parent or legal tutor or if the replica is not particularly realistic or powerful (i.e. low-grade airsoft products).

Red tips must be present on the barrel ends of the airsoft gun when they are imported and sold by a store. Once owning the airsoft gun, one may remove the red tip. However, the similarity between genuine firearms and airsoft replicas is close enough to provoke interaction with law enforcement personnel if an airsoft gun is mistaken for its real counterpart. Airsoft used to commit a crime is treated as if using the real gun, assault weapons carry an extra mandatory sentence in addition to the regular punishment for the crime committed.

Usage and open carriage of airsoft guns in public places is forbidden. One can play on private property away from public sight or in a well-delimited private or state property after having asked the local authorities for a limited-time permit (usually from six to 48 hours) and having alerted the local police command to avoid alarmed citizens calling for emergency.

As the law limits the muzzle energy that an airsoft replica can develop before being classified by law as an air gun, modifying an airsoft gun to deliver more power or to shoot anything other than 6 mm BB plastic pellets is a felony.

Airsoft rental is restricted in Italy. A license is required to rent, but not to buy.

== Japan ==
In Japan, airsoft guns are legal, but may not be fired with a muzzle energy above 3.5 J/cm^{2}. This means a maximum of 0.989 J with 6 mm BBs and 1.64 J with 8 mm BBs. For adolescents, the limit is 0.135 J.

Legal requirements are based on airsoft model manufacturers to prevent any possibility of replica firearms being converted into actual firearms. Standards include (but are not limited to) use of low-melting point metals and non-ballistic plastics in structural components and incompatibility of mechanical components with actual firearm components and mechanisms. The overall litmus test used by the Japanese National Police is whether the replica firearm can be made to chamber and fire an actual round of ammunition. These standards have proven successful within Japan, as it has been found that criminal elements discovered that it is significantly easier to purchase an actual illegal firearm in comparison to modifying a comparatively fragile replica into a functional firearm. Due to this reality, most crimes involving a threat of physical violence are perpetrated with edged weapons, however, firearms seen in public are still (by default) seen as real by the public at large.

== Kuwait ==
In Kuwait, airsoft guns are illegal. Air guns have a different classification.

== Latvia ==
As of 2020, 1.5 J is the maximum muzzle energy allowed in airsoft games. Airsoft guns are now considered low-energy air guns and as such are only sold to people over the age of 18.

== Lithuania ==
Registration is not required for airsoft guns. Guns with less than 2.5 J of energy are not considered weapons and only those over 18 years of age can purchase them.

== Macau ==
Airsoft guns with under 2 J of muzzle energy are legal.

== Malaysia ==
The possession and importation of airsoft guns without a valid license is illegal in Malaysia. Illegal possession or importation of airsoft guns is punishable under Section 36(1) of the Arms Act 1960, with imprisonment for a term not exceeding 1 year, or to a fine not exceeding RM5,000, or to both.

== Malta ==
Airsoft guns were legally introduced in 1985. They have been classified under the category of air guns. This classification includes air rifles (any power limit), airsoft guns, and paintball guns. At that time, owning and purchasing air guns required a Target Shooter B license and membership in a registered and licensed club.

Now, there is an amendment to the current regulation which came into effect in 2013 for airsoft and paintball guns, which are non-lethal guns.

It is no longer required to have a Target shooter license B to purchase, use, and own airsoft or paintball devices.

== Mexico ==
Airsoft is not currently regulated in Mexico and replicas are not governed by the Federal Law on Firearms and Explosives nor its regulations. Accordingly, the practice of airsoft as well as the ownership and possession of airsoft replicas and accessories is legal.

The import of gas blowback airsoft replicas or other replicas powered by compressed gas and their parts are regulated, requiring a permit issued by the Ministry of National Defense. Airsoft replicas powered by piston and spring mechanisms, such as bolt action replicas and AEGs, are not subject to an import permit.

For purposes of the General Law on Import and Export Tariffs, airsoft replicas as well as paintball guns and any other artifacts shooting projectiles of any kind through the use of compressed gasses (such as air, CO_{2}, propane, green gas, or red gas) that are not the result of the conflagration of gunpowder or similar substances, are classified under Heading 93 (Weapons) of the Tariff, subheading 04 pertaining to (Other Weapons - actioned by spring or compressed gases), and would generally fall within the scope of subheading 9304.00.99 (Others), as provided by notes four, five and six of the Explanatory Notes to the Import Tariff, published by the Ministry of Economy on July 7, 2007, in the Official Gazette of the Federation.

Under the Executive Order that governs the sections of the Import Tariff that are subject to prior permit from the Ministry of National Defense and its modification published in the Official Gazette of the Federation on 10 June 2014, the import of merchandise classified in tariff 9304.00.99 is subject to a permit when dealing with Compressed gas contained in pressurized containers, such as CO_{2} or carbonic gas. Weapons based on air compressed by spring or piston are specifically excluded therefrom. Refer to the following regulations: Acuerdo que establece la clasificación y codificación de las mercancías cuya importación o exportación están sujetas a regulación por parte de la Secretaría de la Defensa Nacional, published in the Official Gazette of the Federation (Diario Oficial de la Federación) 30 June 2007, modified by executive orders published in October 2014, and 13 January 2016.

Even though AEGs and spring powered replicas are not required to process an import permit from the Ministry of Defense, care should be taken by anyone importing any such replicas as customs will seize the replica and direct the importer of record to get an Import Permit with the Ministry of Defense. The importer must be well prepared with documentation in Spanish showing the technical specifications and characteristics of the replicas in question, before the Customs authorities will authorize the extraction of the replica from customs premises.

For any doubts as to whether a particular item is subject to an import permit, any individual or entity can submit a consultation with the National Defense Authority.

== Netherlands ==
On 1 January 2013, new Dutch laws regarding airsoft came into effect. Airsoft devices are air, gas, or spring powered weapons with a maximum shooting energy of 3.5 J that look almost completely like real firearms. Those who wish to possess an airsoft replica or participate in a skirmish must be registered with a certified airsoft organization. As of May 2016 only the Dutch Airsoft Sport Association (NABV) was registered. Participation in a skirmish for non-members is allowed up to six times per year, but the NABV will need to receive certain details about the player, which is usually done when renting at an airsoft site. In order to obtain membership with the NABV a person must pass a police background check and must not have committed any crimes in the last eight years.

Since 1 April 2019 a new regulation has been introduced that ensures that replicas are now measured in joules instead of fps, with BBs of at least 0.3 g instead of 0.2. Replicas have the following joule values: Bolt action sniper: 2.3 joules (499 fps with 0.2 g), DMR: 1.7 J (430 fps with 0.2 g), AEG: 1.2 J (360 fps with 0.2 g).

Replicas with two-second delays are no longer part of the sniper class and are identified as DMRs. AEGs are only allowed to shoot up to 0.3 g BBs, while DMRs and BASs can shoot up to 0.4 g. This change was made for safety. Any player who is not a Dutch citizen can play without membership in the Netherlands, but they have to file for an exemption at the NABV.

== New Zealand ==
Air-powered firearms are legal to possess and use in New Zealand, provided that the person is either over 18 years of age or 16 with a firearms license. A person under 18 may not possess an air gun, but may use one under the direct supervision of someone over 18 or a firearms license holder (Direct supervision requires that the license holder be able to take control of the firearm at all times, so they must remain within arms reach).

It is illegal to use these firearms in any manner that may endanger or intimidate members of the public except where there is reasonable cause such as an airsoft game.

In order to import an airsoft gun, one of the following stipulations must be met:

1. Seeks to possess the restricted air gun as part of a collection, and demonstrates that it fits with and enhances an existing collection.
2. Participates in an identifiable shooting discipline or sport at an incorporated sports club with rules encouraging safe and legal use of air guns and a range certified for the shooting activity and intends to use the restricted air gun in an event at that sports club.
3. Wishes to use the restricted air gun in a capacity equivalent to that described in section 29(2)(e) of the Arms Act 1983 ('theatrical purposes').
4. Wishes to replace an unsafe or unserviceable restricted air gun.
5. Requires the restricted air gun for occupational purposes.
6. The individual applying for the permit to import demonstrates the special significance of that particular restricted air gun as an heirloom or memento.
7. A dealer needs to import restricted air guns for the purposes of maintaining a stock of restricted air guns used for an identifiable shooting discipline or sport.
8. A dealer is importing the restricted air gun as agent for an individual who has a special reason for importing that item.
9. A dealer wishes to replace an unsafe or unserviceable restricted air gun.

== North Macedonia ==
In North Macedonia, airsoft is classified under Category "D" weaponry. One must be 18 years old to buy airsoft and must register it in the nearest Sector for Internal Affairs. Minors are allowed to play airsoft but only under supervision and in specialized areas.

== Norway ==
Airsoft guns fall under the arms control legislation (Våpenforskriften). There is no licence requirement for purchasing airsoft guns besides having to be at least 18 years old. Minors can temporarily use airsoft guns under the direct supervision of someone 18 years or older with approval from a parent or guardian. Although the law does not specify a lower age limit, the Norwegian Airsoft Association (NASF) has established 14 as the lowest age limit for member clubs with the option for clubs to set their own higher age limits.

Using an airsoft firearm while committing a crime receives the same punishment as the one received for using a real weapon. One is also required to carry firearms inside a bag, or some other kind of container to conceal the firearm from the public.

Outdoors airsoft games were banned locally in Bergen Kommune in December 2023. In April 2024 the Norwegian Environment Agency (Miljødirektoratet) clarified that biodegradable bb's used in airsoft did not degrade fast enough in Norwegian conditions to be considered truly biodegradable and that outdoor users must clean up after themselves to not risk violating anti-littering laws. In October 2024 the Norwegian Airsoft Association released new rules for airsofting to accommodate the law, including the use of only EN13432 certified biodegradable bb's, two yearly cleanups of outdoor airsoft fields and measures to collect and dispose of bb's in safe zones during loading and unloading of magazines and test firing of weapons.

== Peru ==
In Peru, airsoft is recognized as a sport and no special permit is required for its practice. However, it is essential to comply with the regulations and guidelines established by both the Peruvian Airsoft Sports Federation (FDPA) and the corresponding local authorities.

Replica airsoft guns are subject to specific regulations. They must be registered with the National Superintendency for the Control of Security Services, Arms, Ammunition and Explosives for Civilian Use (SUCAMEC). Their power cannot exceed 400 FPS using 0.20 gram balls, and they must have a visible mark that distinguishes them as replicas, differentiating them from real weapons.

It is forbidden to modify these replicas to increase their power or make them look more like real weapons. Furthermore, they may not be carried in public places; their use is restricted to areas specifically authorized for airsoft practice. They must also be transported in a safe manner, in suitable cases or bags.

== Philippines ==
In the Letter of Instruction 1264, a Presidential Directive, signed by former President Ferdinand Marcos in 1982, bans the import, sale and public display of gun replicas. to classify what constitutes a gun replica and airsoft guns were deemed different from replicas, therefore the common legal interpretation is that there may be no need to repeal LOI 1264 in order to achieve full legalization of airsoft in the Philippines.

Republic Act No. 10591 declassified airsoft weapons as actual firearms. A ban places airsoft guns on the list of banned firearms. It classifies that no person is permitted to carry firearms in public except for security officers, police officers and military personnel on duty.

A Permit To Transport license is needed and license the replica as a firearm with the government. It is also required that the individual is a member of an airsoft club and must be 18 years of age or older. A license is required to manufacture or sell an airsoft replica. It is also mandated to have a Permit To Carry outside of residency license. Failure to comply with the rule is punishable by imprisonment and a fine of ten thousand Pesos (₱10,000).

== Poland ==
Airsoft guns and the sport itself are legal in Poland. The law does not distinguish airsoft guns from air guns, thus the only requirement is that they cannot exceed 17 J of energy (corresponding to a muzzle velocity of c.a. 1,353 ft/s assuming a 0.20 gram BB), which would classify them as pneumatic weapons. Openly carrying an airsoft replica in a public area is not prohibited, and a replica does not require an orange or red tip at the end of the barrel. One does not have to be 18 to purchase an airsoft gun, as there are no age restrictions on its purchase or use.

== Portugal ==
With the new revision of the "Firearms and Ammunition Act", airsoft guns are not considered as firearms. Currently, the formal definition of an airsoft gun is a recreational firearm reproduction (a"replica" have a different legal application under the same law). However, in order to be characterized as a recreational firearm reproduction, its muzzle energy must not exceed 1.3 J (equivalent to a muzzle velocity of 374 fps with a 0.2g BB). The minimum age to purchase and use these reproductions is 18 years old but can drop to 16 if written parental consent is given.

Under the same act, to purchase and operate an airsoft gun, one must be a member of an APD - Sport Promotion Association. Recognition of this APD is made by the IPDJ - Portuguese Youth and Sports Institute as it represents the state. The Firearms and Ammunition Act also states that after being approved by the IDP, the APD must be enlisted as such by the Portuguese law enforcement authority. There are several APDs for airsoft in Portugal, CAM - Clube de Airsoft da Maia, ALA (FPA) Associação Lusitana de Airsoft, APA - Associação Portuguesa de Airsoft, ANA - Associação Nacional de Airsoft, APMA - Associação Portuguesa de Milsim e Airsoft, ADAPT - Associação Desportiva de Airsoft Português, and AACP - Associação Airsoft Costa de Prata.

In addition, airsoft guns have to be painted either in fluorescent yellow or fluorescent red and be in compliance with the following criteria:

- Long guns (more than 60 cm total length and more than 30 cm of barrel)- 10 cm from the barrel tip and 100% of the stock.
- Short guns (less than 60 cm total length or less than 30 cm of barrel)- 5 cm from the barrel tip and 100% of the grip.

== Romania ==
Law number 295 (Regimul Armelor şi Muniţiilor) regulates all use of firearms and associated ammunition. The law is quite unclear (concerning airsoft firearms) as to whether this kind of firearm classifies as a "non-lethal weapon" or "toy." The law regulates the use of air-powered firearms (e.g. sport/competition use that use a metal projectile) under the "non-lethal" category and solely requires that one is at least 18 years old to purchase and register the firearm at the police precinct nearest to one's location. Any air/gas-powered weapon that shoots plastic projectiles only and does not exceed the velocity of 220 m/s (e.g. airsoft guns) can be purchased by anyone who is 18+ years old without any need of registering.

The law specifies that usage of night vision (infrared) or laser aiming devices designed for military use is completely restricted to members of the army and associated entities even if the aiming device is used on a lower-restriction category firearm (e.g. such as on an airsoft gun). The law, however, does not restrict in any way the use of aiming devices not designed for military use.

The use or show of airsoft guns replicas is not permitted in public places, they can be used only in dedicated or non populated areas with the permission of the owner or administrator. For transporting, the airsoft replica must be unloaded and secured from public view (transportation bag).

Furthermore, the law specifies that, should one attempt to use a non-lethal or replica gun to perform (or attempt to perform) armed robbery, one shall be prosecuted as if a real firearm had been used.

== Russia ==
Airsoft guns with a muzzle energy below 3 J (muzzle velocity 173.2 m/s for 0.20 g projectiles) are legal, are not considered weapons, and players must be 14 or older.

== Serbia ==
According to the Law on Weapons and Ammunition, airsoft guns fall into category D in classification of weapons, which means anyone over the age of nine may legally acquire an airsoft gun. No licensing is required. There are no special regulations regarding shape, function or other characteristics of an airsoft gun.

== Slovakia ==
Airsoft guns have a status similar to the Czech Republic, where they are considered to be firearms. All firearms are governed by law 190/2003. Here, airsoft guns fit into firearm class D (§7b) and no permit is needed. Ownership of airsoft weapons is only allowed for adults (18 years of age). The use of airsoft guns is allowed by players that are least 3 years old. People under the age of 18 must by accompanied by an adult. Guns may not have an energy greater than 15 joules. The use of night vision scopes is forbidden. The owner of a gun is required by law to secure the firearm when not using it.

Importation of airsoft guns (from outside of EU), all critical parts/components of airsoft guns and aiming devices (optics, RDS, etc.) are permitted only with a weapon importation license. For airsoft parts, most monitored on customs are barrels, optics, magazines, receivers and accessories like grenades. Springs, gears, hop-ups, pistons, cylinders, switches, triggers are usually let through. External and non-critical parts like rails, holders, bipods, etc. can be legally imported without the license.

== Slovenia ==
There is no age restriction on playing airsoft in Slovenia, but most stores enforce 18+ rule or to be accompanied with a parent or a guardian to buy a replica. For games, in serious clubs, the age limit is usually 14+ with the parents or guardians written consent although there is no legal requirement for this. For bigger events 18+ rule is usually enforced by the organisers. Replicas are forbidden to be carried in public as the police will treat them as real weapons.

== Singapore ==
In Singapore, airsoft was allowed in civilian ownership until October 2001 when the country's Weapons and Firearms Act was amended to prohibit ownership after police reports of people hurt by misuse.

Airsoft guns are considered controlled items, and it is prohibited to own or import them, unless granted a license usually reserved for security professionals or film props. As of 2020, TactSim, an indoor airsoft facility allows players to participate in games, and airsoft equipment is rented to players for the duration of the game. A law was passed in Jan 2021 to better regulate replica guns as they are deemed to be too little risk to warrant tight regulation. However, the legality of importing and private ownership of airsoft is still assumed to be unchanged.

== South Korea ==
Airsoft guns in Republic of Korea are deemed to be toy guns (not for sports) but considered illegal and imitation guns if any of the laws are broken.

According to the "Enforcement decree of the Control of Firearms, Swords, Explosives, Etc. Act", (총포·도검·화약류등단속법시행령) in 2017, imitation guns are recognized according to any one of the following criteria:

1. A metal or non-metal object, very similar to the shape of a gun that has a high possibility to be used for crime.
2. A metal or non-metal object that shoots metal or non-metal projectiles, or makes sound or fire and fulfills any one of the following criteria:
  a. The diameter of the projectile is less than 5.7 mm
  b. The weight of the projectile is over 0.2 g
  c. The kinetic energy (destructive power) of the projectile is over 0.02 kgm
  d. The head of the projectile is sharp and not rounded
  e. The object makes an instant explosion sound louder than 90 dB or produces flames

Additionally, possession of optics with an adjustment function is prohibited.

Although South Korea has some of the strictest laws in the world regarding muzzle velocity, licensed businesses such as official airsoft fields and shooting ranges are no longer subject to muzzle velocity limitations as of 2021.

== Spain ==
Players have to comply with their town halls' requirements, which differ from town to town. Some towns however require players to provide a clear Criminal Record Certificate, pass a psychological exam (typical for firearms), have the guns serialized by a certified armorer, and have them inspected to check that the serial numbers match the declared ones. It is legal to buy, possess and sell airsoft replicas and accessories.

== Sweden ==
In Sweden, airsoft devices are considered limited effect firearms, and thus fall under Swedish gun laws. To buy, and possess a limited effect firearm, one needs to be at least 18 years old (the law also makes room for special permits for people under 18 years old, but to date, no one seems to have been issued such a permit). Minors can be lent a limited effect firearm, if the lender is closely supervising and able to take the device from the minor immediately if needed. Violations of this is considered a gun crime, and both the minor, lender and the minor's guardians can be held accountable, with prison as a possible outcome if severe enough.

In order to possess a CO_{2}, air, or spring operated firearm without a license, the impact energy of a projectile fired at a distance of four meters (from the muzzle) must be less than ten joules, or three joules if automatic.

As of 27 August 2015 a lower limit for limited effect firearms was set at 0.2 J.

As of 2 January 2015 it is legal to own and import gas operated airsoft weapons.

== Switzerland ==
In Switzerland, airsoft guns are considered toys if below 0.5 joules, while airsoft guns above 0.5 Joules are considered weapons. Airsoft guns above 0.5 joules may not be sold to or possessed by persons who are under 18 or who have a criminal conviction. Additionally, airsoft guns may not be sold to individuals from Albania, Algeria, Bosnia-Herzegovina, Kosovo, North Macedonia, Serbia, Turkey or Sri Lanka.

The importation of airsoft guns is restricted to companies and individuals who hold weapons import licences. Private individuals can apply for a permit to import up to three airsoft guns which is valid for six months.

For private sales to take place, there must be a written contract between both parties. Both parties are required to retain the contract for a period of ten years. As long as they contain no propellant, there is no restriction on the purchase or import of airsoft BBs. It is illegal to carry any airsoft guns in a public place, however it is permissible to transport them directly between a player's home and an event site.

== Taiwan ==
The weapons over 20 Joule/m2 will be considered as lethal weapon. There is no permission required for possessing or selling/purchasing airsoft weapons and there is no age limitation. However, according to the Social Order Maintenance Act, carrying replica or airsoft publicly will violate the Article 65-4: Carrying toy guns that resemble real guns and may undermine safety without justifiable reasons

== Thailand ==
Only whitelisted shops can sell airsoft guns and supplies, the law is a bit vague. Paintball guns, BB guns, and airsoft guns are not considered firearms, but for import or export a license is needed, with a quota for how many guns can be imported or exported per year, and which must be renewed every year. It is legal to possess them without having a permit or registering them, however the owner must comply with the following conditions:

- only plastic bullets are used
- when carrying the gun outside of the owner's property, it must be packed in a safe case or box. It is not allowed to be carried in shirt or trouser pockets, nor can it be left out in the open
- the gun cannot be used to commit a crime or torture animals.

The gun is considered illegal if any of these rules are broken.

== Ukraine ==
Airsoft guns with a muzzle energy below 3 J (muzzle velocity 173.2 m/s for 0.20 g projectiles) are legal, are not considered weapons, and do not require any permission.

== United Arab Emirates ==
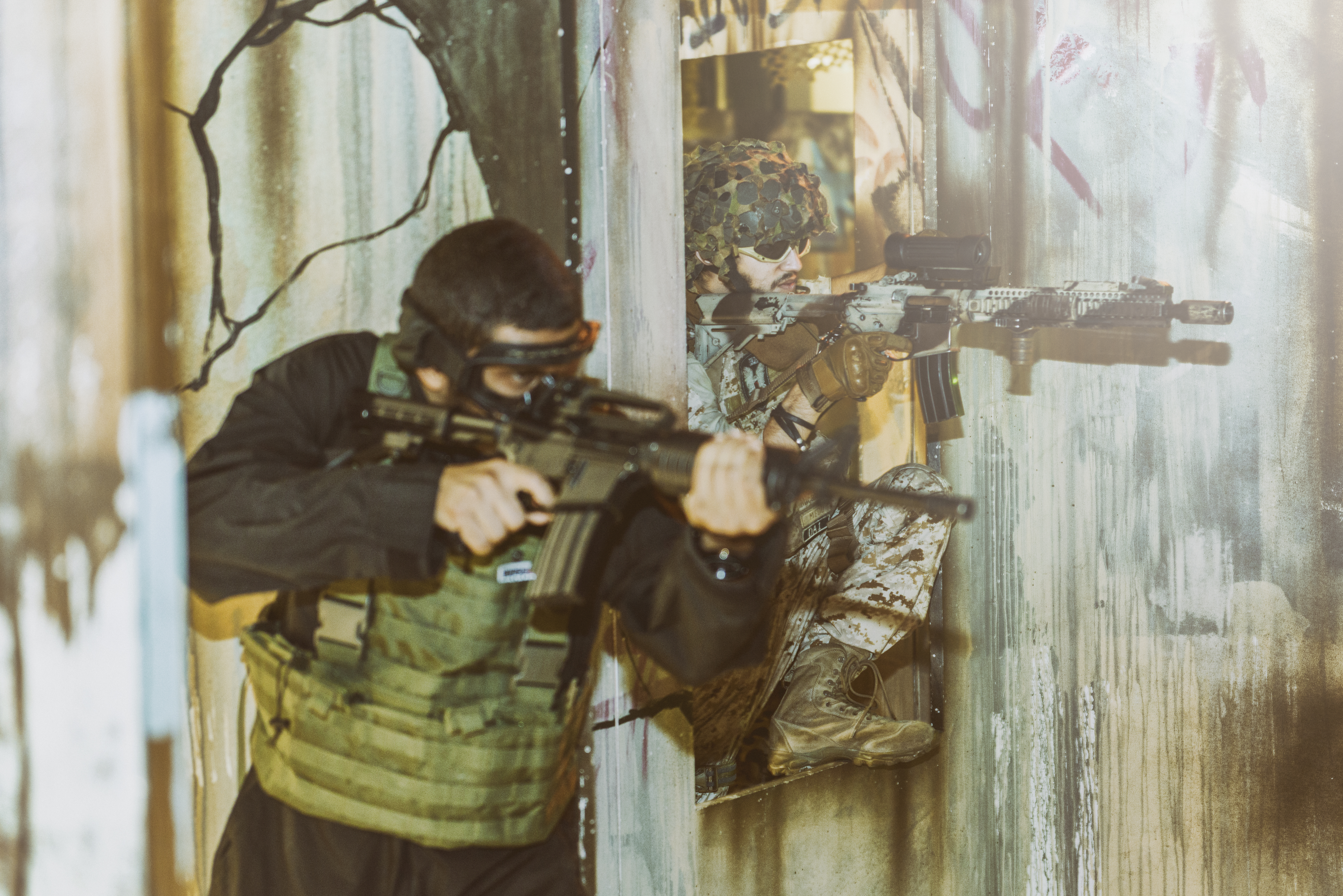
Airsoft player at Tasleeh field at Yas Mall (closed since 2019)

Airsoft guns are legally permitted for ownership and possession in the United Arab Emirates (UAE). These guns can be purchased from specialized weapon stores that hold the necessary import permits, as civilians are prohibited from directly importing airsoft guns.

While airsoft is not officially recognized as an organized sport in the UAE, there are designated arenas for airsoft and paintball where enthusiasts can engage in these activities. Airsoft guns are regulated to ensure they have a muzzle velocity of less than 2 joules (approximately 450 feet per second). The acquisition and use of tactical gear are allowed, except for items currently used by military or law enforcement.

In Abu Dhabi, the ownership of airsoft guns is restricted to UAE nationals, with non-nationals prohibited from purchasing these airsoft. Airsoft guns are strictly to be used within official airsoft and paintball facilities. Public carrying or use of airsoft guns is prohibited, and they must be securely stored when not in use. Breaches of these regulations can lead to criminal charges. UAE Use of weapons law.

Airsoft guns can be purchased from various retailers, including MP3 International and Tasleeh in Abu Dhabi; AlQannas, Sahara, and Neshan in Dubai; and Sharjah Paintball Park in Sharjah, which also hosts local airsoft events. Note that Tasleeh no longer operates an airsoft field but continues to operate a retail shop in Abu Dhabi. Tasleeh Shooting (Abu Dhabi) used electronic vests (made by the MAHA7 company) to detect BB hits. The sensor covered the front vest, back vest, helmet, and glasses, and was controlled wirelessly by the marshals. The sensor was activated only by BB hits, and once activated, it would show a red light and emit a sound to register a hit. The equipment also recorded the time of the hit.

Once a year, the ADIHEX (Abu Dhabi International Hunting and Equestrian Exhibition) at ADNEC Centre Abu Dhabi is the largest event in the middle east where all new airsoft models are showcased, and people have the opportunity to purchase airsoft guns during the exhibition.

Since 2008, local airsoft players have been hosted at several venues, including the Armed Forces Officers Club and ADNEC in Abu Dhabi, Hot Pursuit Paintball in Dubai, Paintball Hobby Center in Al Ain, and Sharjah Paintball Park. The unofficial yet active GUNMATIC Instagram account provides updates and connects airsoft enthusiasts throughout the Middle East and North Africa to the global MilSim events.

== United Kingdom ==
There are currently certain restrictions on the possession of airsoft replicas, which came in with the introduction of the ASBA (Anti-social Behaviour Act 2003) amendments, prohibiting the possession of any firearms replica in a public place without good cause (to be concealed in a gun case or container only, not to be left in view of public at any time).

According to Section 36 of the VCRA (Violent Crime Reduction Act 2006) which came into effect on 1 October 2007, RIF's (Realistic Imitation Firearms) may not be sold, imported, or manufactured. Unrealistic imitation firearms (IF's) must have their principal color as transparent, bright red, bright orange, bright yellow, bright blue, bright green, bright pink, or bright purple or have dimensions of no more than a height of 38 mm and a length of 70 mm (as defined in the Home Office regulations for the VCRA). Exceptions to the act are available for the following:

- a museum or gallery
- theatrical performances and rehearsals of such performances
- the production of films and television programs
- the organisation and holding of historical re-enactments
- crown servants.

The notes for the VCRA state the following: "The regulations provide for two new defenses. The first is for the organisation and holding of airsoft skirmishing. This is defined by reference to "permitted activities" and the defence applies only where third party liability insurance is held in respect of the activities." and "The defence for airsoft skirmishing can apply to individual players because their purchase of realistic imitation firearms for this purpose is considered part of the "holding" of a skirmishing event."

The airsoft defence is based on whether or not a person is a skirmisher. One of the measures put in place by retailers was the forming of a centrally recorded and maintained database. This system is managed by the United Kingdom Airsoft Retailers Association or UKARA. UKARA shares the database of registered skirmishers with the member retailers allowing verification that the purchaser is allowed to buy a RIF under the VCRA skirmisher defence. To qualify for the UKARA database, a person must skirmish three or more times over a period of at least 56 days, and typically at one site. The airsoft site they register at must hold Public Liability Insurance.

It is an offence for anyone under 18 to purchase an airsoft gun (realistic or otherwise) or to sell one to a person under 18. Gifting is not an offence, therefore a person over 18 can buy one for a minor.

Following an amendment to the Policing and Crime Act 2017 which came into effect on 2 May 2017, airsoft guns (realistic or otherwise) are defined in UK law by the muzzle kinetic energy with which they are capable of firing a projectile, and are exempted from firearms legislation. An airsoft gun firing a projectile with a muzzle kinetic energy greater than the ones outlined in the PCA 2017 is no longer considered to be an airsoft gun and falls under firearms legislation. The specified muzzle kinetic energies are 1.3 joules for any automatic gun (which is capable of discharging two or more missiles successively without repeated pressure on the trigger) and 2.5 joules for all other guns.

== United States ==
Under federal law, airsoft guns are not classified as firearms and are legal for all ages, so a person of any age may use one (one must obtain the permission of their parent/legal guardian, if under 18). This is also the case for the laws in each state. Airsoft guns, despite not being "real firearms", are still subject to many laws. One such law is the requirement to be 18 to buy or sell an airsoft replica. Another notable law governing airsoft guns is the requirement of the orange tip. Orange tips are not legally required unless the guns are being transported to a local field or other place, or shipped through the mail. However, per federal law, there is an option to use an orange barrel plug that protrudes 6 mm from the outer barrel of the gun instead of an orange tip.

Airsoft guns in the United States are generally sold with a 0.24 inch or longer orange tip on the barrel in order to distinguish them from real firearms, as is required by federal law. Manufacturers and importers may cite Part 272 of Title 15 of the Code of Federal Regulations on foreign commerce and trade (15 CFR 272), which stipulates that "no person shall manufacture, enter into commerce, ship, transport, or receive any toy, look-alike, or imitation firearm" without approved markings; these may include an orange tip, orange barrel plug, brightly colored exterior of the whole toy, or transparent construction. However these restrictions do not apply to "traditional B-B, paint-ball, or pellet-firing air guns that expel a projectile through the force of compressed air, compressed gas, or mechanical spring action, or any combination thereof."

In addition, the similarity between genuine firearms and airsoft replicas is close enough to provoke interaction with local law enforcement personnel if an airsoft gun is carried openly in public. If someone were to, for example, attempt a robbery with an airsoft gun, they would be charged as if the airsoft gun were a real firearm. In some recent cases, people carrying or brandishing airsoft guns have been fatally shot by law enforcement personnel.

== Vietnam ==
Airsoft guns in Vietnam are defined as "sporting weapons" or "support instruments" and requires an ownership license usually reserved for security professionals or film props. According to Clause 5 and Clause 11 of Article 1 on the "Law on management and use of weapons, explosives and combat gears" enacted on June 29, 2024, by the National Assembly:

5. "Sporting weapons" include:

a) Air rifles or rifles using exploding bullets, air handguns, handguns using exploding bullets, sporting guns using paintballs, skeet guns and ammunition used for these types of guns on the list promulgated by the Minister of Public Security equipped and used for sports training and competition;

b) The weapons specified in point a clause 4 of this Article used for sports training and competition;

c) Basic parts of the guns specified in point a of this clause, consisting of frame, barrel, trigger, breechblock, firing pin...

11. "Support instruments" refer to equipment, or military animals used to carry out missions and provide protection, which aims to prevent and stop violators from resisting or running away; protect law enforcers and people performing protection missions or giving signals of emergency, including:

a) Stun guns, guns shooting asphyxiant gas, guns shooting poisons, tranquillizer guns, coilguns, net guns; rope launchers; guns using plastic bullets, guns using exploding bullets, guns using rubber bullets, tear gas, flares, tracers and ammunition used for these types of guns; devices used for spraying tear gas, asphyxiant gas, poisons, anesthetics or itching powder; smoke grenades, tear gas grenades, flashbangs; stun batons, rubber batons, metal batons; figure-8 handcuffs, spike-boards, barbed wires; armors; electric gloves, knife gloves; shields, bulletproof helmets; sonic weapons; interrogation chairs for special subjects on the list promulgated by the Minister of Public Security;

b) Military animals which refer to animals trained and used for protecting national security and ensuring social order and safety on the list promulgated by the Minister of Public Security;

c) Other weapons with properties and effects similar to those of support instruments specified in point a or point b of this clause, not included in the list promulgated by the Minister of Public Security.''

Also according to Article 306 of the Criminal Code of Vietnam, manufacture, possession, transport, use, trading or appropriation of airsoft guns are illegal and could result in fines or imprisonment:

"1. Any person who illegally manufactures, possesses, transports, uses, deals in or appropriates a hunting rifle, cold weapon, sporting weapon, combat gear or another weapon with similar functions despite the fact that he/she has incurred an administrative penalty for the same offence or has an unspent conviction for the same offence shall face a penalty of 03 to 24 months' imprisonment.

2. This offence committed in any of the following circumstances carries a penalty of 01 to 05 years' imprisonment:

a) The offence is committed by an organized group;

b) The offence involves ≥ 11 hunting rifles, cold weapons, sporting weapons, combat gears or other weapons that are not on the list of weapons compiled by the Government but have similar functions as military weapons;

c) Illegal goods are transported or traded across the border;

d) The offence results in the death of 01 person or bodily harm to 01 person who suffers from ≥ 61% WPI;

đ) The offence results in bodily harm to more than one person, each of whom suffers from 31% - 60% WPI;

e) The offence results in bodily harm to ≥ 03 people who suffer from a total WPI of 61% - 121%;

g) The property damage caused by the offence is assessed at ≥ VND 100,000,000;

h) Dangerous recidivism.''

3. The offender might also be liable to a fine of from VND 10,000,000 to VND 50,000,000, put under mandatory supervision or prohibited from residence for 01 to 05 years."

However, Vietnam is having similar problems and situations as China: airsoft guns are compounded by moral panics from the mass media which is exaggerate the safety threat posed by airsoft guns and airsoft is effectively banished from the public. Such examples include confusing the definition of airsoft guns with far more powerful air guns, arguments that airsoft weapons can be easily modified to shoot more lethal projectiles or even converted into real firearms, or citing demonstrations of airsoft guns penetrating paper targets at point-blank range, all appealing for a blanket ban on replica toys out of concerns for child safety. Despite the restrictions against the sport, many people (even small numbers of law enforcement and military officers) still take risks to import and acquire airsoft. To avoid the government tracing online, various underground airsoft community forums often refer airsoft to other slangs (for example, "củi", meaning "wood"). Alternative MilSim activities using gel ball shooters as replacements have also become increasingly popular in recent years, even when the authorities heightened its crackdown operations.
