= Yehorivka, Polohy Raion =

Village in Zaporizhzhia Oblast, Ukraine

Yehorivka Єгорівка
- Village
- Interactive map of Yehorivka
- Location of Yehorivka in Zaporizhzhia Oblast Yehorivka (Zaporizhzhia Oblast)
- Coordinates: 47.626301°N 35.935287°E
- Country: Ukraine
- Oblast: Zaporizhzhia Oblast
- Raion: Polohy Raion
- Founded: 1919

Area
  - Total: 1.535 km^{2} (0.593 sq mi)
- Elevation: 64 m (210 ft)

Population (2001 census)
  - Total: 226
  - Estimate (2022): 215
  - Density: 147/km^{2} (381/sq mi)
- Time zone: UTC+2 (EET)
  - Summer (DST): UTC+3 (EEST)
- Postal code: 70523
- Area code: +380 6141

Yehorivka (Ukrainian: Єго́рівка; Russian: Егоровка) is a village in Polohy Raion (district) in Zaporizhzhia Oblast of Ukraine, at about 64.38 kilometres (40.00 mi) southeast by east (SEbE) from the centre of Zaporizhzhia city. It could also refer to the map in the game Squad (video game).

== Geography ==
Yehorivka is located on the right bank of Zherebets' river. The village is intersected by the highway T 0814.
