= Xploderz =

Line of toy guns

- Type: Toy gun
- Company: The Maya Group
- Country: United States
- Availability: 2011–Present
- Materials: Plastic (guns); Water (pellets)
- Slogan: "More Distance. More Ammo."
- Official website

Xploderz is a line of toy weapons made by The Maya Group to compete with Hasbro's Nerf Super Soaker line and marketed as a safer alternative to paintball. The concept is based on Orbeez, a toy line also by The Maya Group that uses water-absorbent gel pellets, and hence the toy line is sometimes referred to as "Orbeez ball shooters".

When playing, a piston rod is manually pulled back against spring tension in a fashion similar to drawing a slingshot, allowing pellets to be drop-loaded from a top mounted magazine. When the rod is released, the spring elasticity drives piston to pressurize the air pump behind the pellets, which in turn propels the pellets flying out forward.

The ammunition used is what the Maya Group calls "H2Grow Technology", wherein superabsorbent polymer pellets (containing sodium polyacrylate, sodium hydroxide and colorings) grow into spherical hydrogel beads around 7–11 mm in size after being immersed in water for about three hours. Unlike airsoft and paintball pellets, the hydrogel shots are not biodegradable, and should not be inhaled once dried or in their powdered form. They are easy to clean off clothing, and will not cause any bodily injury due to their softness and readily tendency to fragment upon impact. Finally, sodium polyacrylate can cause severe clogging if it enters sewers or drainage systems in large quantities. Otherwise, sodium polyacrylate is non-toxic and safe from any major risks. The data on its safety on environment is not adequate, however it is considered non-biodegradable and may cause salinization of soil when added in large quantities.

== See also ==
- Gel ball shooter
