= Squad 44 =

2018 video game

- Developer: Offworld Industries
- Designers: Daniel Alves; Kaan Cakir; Ross Houston; Martin Testard; Cameron Gillies
- Programmers: John Metcalfe; Yash Verma
- Artists: Kaan Cakir; Nikolaou Charalambos; Marek Polivka
- Composer: Scott Tobin
- Engine: Unreal Engine 4
- Platform: Microsoft Windows
- Release: 9 August 2018
- Genres: First-person shooter, tactical shooter
- Mode: Multiplayer

Squad 44 (formerly Post Scriptum) is a 2018 tactical first-person shooter video game developed by the Canadian studio Offworld Industries alongside the British studio Mercury Arts, and published by Offworld Industries. It is set during World War II, specifically during Operation Market Garden, Operation Overlord, the Battle of France, Battle of Crete, Battle of the Bulge, the Battle of Iwo Jima, and the Battle of Guadalcanal. The game features several playable factions — the United States Army, United States Marine Corps, British Army, Polish Armed Forces in the West, French Army, Wehrmacht, Waffen-SS, Australian Army, New Zealand Military Forces, Hellenic Army, and the Imperial Japanese Army — with some of them having multiple different playable units.

== Development ==
It was initially developed as a mod for Offworld Industries' Squad, with Post Scriptum becoming its own standalone game by the French studio Periscope Games with assistance from their publisher, Offworld Industries. It released on 9 August 2018 through video game distributor Steam.

On November 20, 2023 Offworld Industries announced the acquisition of Post Scriptum. Offworld Industries revealed it will be working with Mercury Arts on the game. Offworld also said it is working on a 2024 roadmap of updates that will be shared with the community at a later time On December 14, 2023 the game was rebranded to Squad 44.

== Content ==
There are multiple maps for each battle included in the game.

=== Operation Market Garden (Chapter 1: The Bloody Seventh) ===
- Driel
- Heelsum
- Oosterbeek
- Doorwerth
- Arnhem
- Velmolen
- Veghel
- Best
- Grave

=== Battle of France (Chapter 2: Plan Jaune) ===
- Stonne
- Dinant
- Maginot

=== Operation Overlord (Chapter 3: Day of Days) ===
- Utah Beach
- St. Mere Eglise
- Carentan
- Sainte-Marie-du-Mont
- Longues-sur-Mer

=== Battle of the Bulge (Chapter 4: Watch on the Rhine) ===
- Foy
- Haguenau
- Colmar

=== Battle of Crete (Chapter Mercury) ===
- Maleme
- Rethymno

=== The Pacific Front ===
- Iwo Jima
- Guadalcanal
