= Gel blaster =

Toy gun that fires soft polymer beads

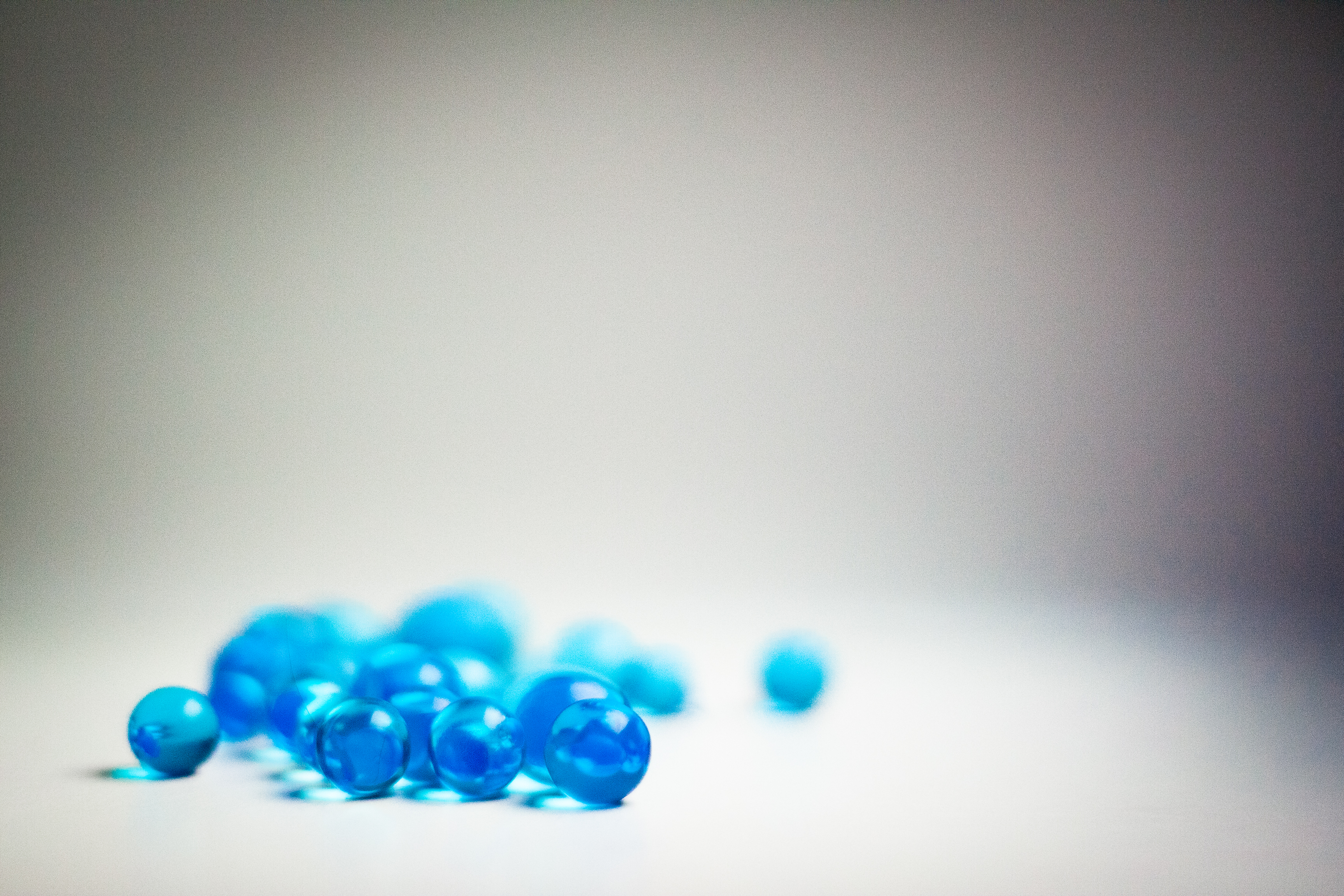
Water bead ammunition

A gel ball blaster, also known as a water gel blaster, orbeez gun, gel gun, gel shooter, gel marker, hydro gel blaster, water bead blaster or gelsoft gun, is a toy gun similar in design to airsoft guns, but the projectiles they shoot are 7–8mm (depending on the replica) superabsorbent polymer water beads (most commonly sodium polyacrylate, colloquially called gel balls, water beads, hydrogel balls, water bullets or simply gels), which are often sold commercially as moisture retainers for gardening and pot/vase floriculture. It is popular in Australia and mainland China, where normal airsoft equipment is banned or hard to obtain.

Gel ball blasters are often played in CQB-style shooting skirmishes similar to paintball by squads or local clubs of enthusiasts often referred to as "gelballers" or "gelsofters", but follow an airsoft-like honor-based gameplay umpiring system. MilSim games involving players wearing camouflage and dump pouches are very popular, while "SpeedGel" players are more casual with team jerseys and often wear paintball masks. In addition to safety gear such as eye protections, the sport is heavily regulated on the field and players must adhere to safety rules.

== Design ==
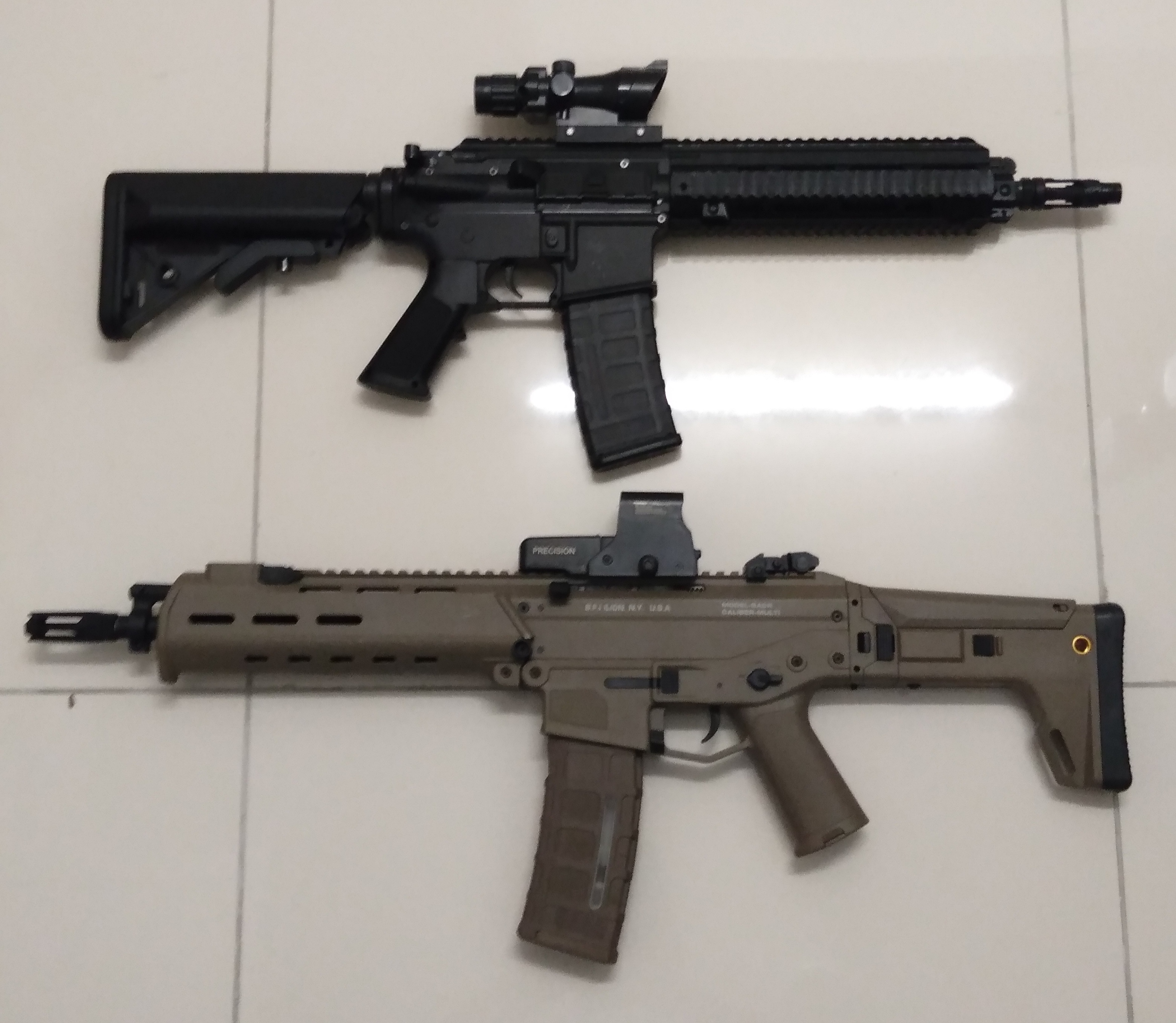
Two gel ball blasters. The top one is based on a Heckler & Koch HK416 while the below is based on a Remington ACR.

The general design of gel ball blasters is very similar to airsoft guns, usually comprising a coil spring-loaded piston air pump, with a T-piece ahead of the pump outlet to feed gel beads. The spring-piston pump is either manually cocked (like a spring-piston gun) or more commonly driven by an electric motor-gearbox assembly powered by batteries (mostly identical to airsoft automatic electric guns (AEG)). Whilst the pressure output is identical to most airsoft guns via the use of compressed air, the uneven spherical shape, lower weight and greater size of the projectile results in lower muzzle velocity than most airsoft guns. This nature of the gel ball external and terminal ballistics make them much safer to play with (although protective eyewear is still recommended) and very unlikely to cause any property damage. The gel beads are also very cheap, easily transported in packets and only require soaking in water for a few hours prior to playing. Another feature is the ease of cleaning, since the gel beads are made up of water in over 98% of mass and volume, and will break upon impact and simply dehydrate into tiny slush powder fragments afterwards.

Originally, the early gel ball blaster designs used paintball-style top-mounted hoppers (often disguised as fake optical sights) that relied on gravity to load the gel beads when shooting, because the water beads were typically too fragile to withstand even the pressure exerted by a follower spring. However, in late 2016, bottom-mounted magazines with inbuilt motors were introduced, which draw power from the main batteries (via contact points at the top) to drive a cogwheel that gently pushed the beads up a feeding tube. This gave a lot more realism than previously and triggered a huge surge in the popularity and market of gel ball blasters. The recent proliferation of more hardy gel beads on the market has also introduced magazines using the traditional spring follower.

=== Gas blowback blasters ===
In early 2020, "Kublai P1", a gas-powered version modelled after the Glock pistol, started to appear on the market. The P1 is essentially the same in design to gas blowback airsoft pistols, and uses refrigerant gas (such as R-134a or HFC-152a) or propane to charge a gas canister built within a spring-follower magazine. The original version is fully polymer, but an upgraded version with metal slide and barrel is available for sale by retailers in Australia. Numerous other manufacturers have followed suit, releasing their own brands of gas blowback pistols.

== Accessories ==
There are a variety of products made and produced to complement gel ball blasters, which feeds from ordinary gel ball ammunition.

=== Grenades ===
Gel grenades are essentially a bottle with an internal spring mechanism. When the safety clip is pulled and the lever is relaxed, a sear mechanism is released and allows three trapdoor-like hatches on the external shell to spread open, followed by the release of three spring-loaded hinged flaps underneath that "flick out" out any gel beads stored within the cavity between the hatches and the flaps, causing a "shower" of gel beads in all directions. The sear can be designed to release in a delayed fashion, or in response to vibrations caused by impacts.

=== Anti-personnel mine ===
Gel mines are essentially plastic clamshell containers shaped like the M18 Claymore, with a pair of spring-loaded internal hinged flaps connected end-to-end by a looping piece of canvas. When the mine is loaded, the two flaps are folded down and trapped by the locked-shut clamshell enclosure, and gel beads are stored into the space within the canvas loop via a small feeding window on the front enclosure. The locking mechanism of the clamshell enclosure can be released manually by a tripwire, or by a remote control. When released, the clamshell enclosure opens up, allowing the two spring flaps to flip out like a french door, stretching and flattening the canvas between them, which will launch out all the stored gel beads towards the front direction.

=== Launchers ===
In March 2020, a gel ball blaster version of the M203 grenade launcher was introduced to the Chinese market by MAX SUN, which is designed to mount on the underside of another gel ball blaster's handguard via a Picatinny rail interface. It uses a rechargeable aluminium gas canister shaped like a 40 mm grenade, whose cap portion has six tubular holes each capable of holding numerous 7mm gel balls. Instead of actually launching the "grenade", the launcher actually functions like a shotgun. When the trigger is pulled, the launcher's spring-loaded hammer strikes a valve at the center of the "grenade" base and allows the canister's stored gas to be released through its cap holes, propelling and spraying out a shower of gel balls towards the target.

Another Chinese company called LDT also introduced a similar "grenade launcher" in the shape of the Milkor MGL, which uses a mainspring-driven revolver-like mechanism that needs to be manually wound before use, and can hold a total of six canisters for repeated discharges.

== Safety concerns ==
Safety concerns have been expressed about children using gel ball blasters. Between December 2018 and May 2019, eight children (ranging in age from four to 14 years) presented at the Queensland Children's Hospital emergency department with eye injuries caused by gel-blaster guns. In 2019, a 14-year-old presented at a hospital in Brisbane with temporary vision loss, pain, and vomiting after being struck in the eye by a gel pellet at 10 metres (33 ft).

== Legality ==
First introduced in China as an airsoft substitute (as airsoft has been effectively banned in the Mainland since 2008) and as a better alternative to foam dart guns, gel ball blasters have become increasingly popular in regions with airsoft-unfriendly laws such as Malaysia, Vietnam, Singapore and particularly Australia, where they gained a significant enthusiast following in states including Queensland and South Australia.

=== Australia ===
Gel ball blasters have been involved in several criminal incidents. In May 2020, a man was arrested for allegedly perpetrating drive-by attacks on pedestrians with gel ball blasters. There have been numerous reports in QLD and SA of persons being charged and arrested for misuse of gel ball blasters. As the gel beads (which are commonly sold in gardening and household hardware stores) are not legally regarded as ammunition, gel ball blasters are classified as toys by the ACCC ASN/NZ 8124 in Australia and used to be legal for sale. However, some toy importers and merchants, such as Brad Towner from Armored Heaven in New South Wales and Peter Clarke from Tactical Edge in Queensland, have been subjected to shipment seizures by the Australian Border Force and prosecuted for "firearm offences" but won their cases in court. There were also incidents of NSW Police border patrol ambushing and arresting people who drove interstate to purchase gel ball blasters from Queensland. Similarly, DJI's popular remote controlled toy ground drone, the RoboMaster S1, which was introduced into the international market in mid-2019, was almost banned from import into Australia because it had a blaster gun for competitive tag matches, and as of November 2020 is still not available for sale in Victoria and New South Wales in order to "comply with local laws and regulations".

==== South Australia ====
On 8 October 2020, the South Australia Police (SAPOL) announced that gel ball blasters would be officially declared as a regulated imitation firearm, and subjected to the same sale and possession licensing as paintball markers under the Firearms Act 2015 and Firearms Regulations 2017. People owning gel ball blasters are required to obtain a Category A firearm licence and registration within a six-month amnesty period (from 8 October 2020 to 7 April 2021), or hand any unauthorised items into a police station or a participating firearms dealer. Calls to compensate businesses crippled by the new regulations have been rejected by the State Government. On 14 October, SAPOL made the first gel ball blaster-related arrest of a 26-year-old man. The new regulation has been met with protests from enthusiasts, but South Australia's paintball community has applauded the crackdown. This crackdown leaves Queensland as the only state in Australia where gel ball blasters are able to be possessed without a licence, though laws were passed in July 2020 categorising gel ball blasters as restricted items which means they must be stored in a locked container and cannot be possessed without a reasonable excuse.

In late 2020, a court case was filed against SAPOL seeking to challenge the ban on gel ball blasters. Chris Sinclair, spokesman for the now defunct Gel Blaster Association of Australia was quoted as saying he was confident these court proceedings would be successful. Exact details and the outcome of the court case is at this point unknown however a GoFundMe campaign raised over $22,870 towards fees for a "class action against SAPOL".

==== Western Australia ====
From 3 July 2021, the Western Australian Government banned gel ball blasters citing similarity to real weapons and legitimate safety concerns. After 3 July 2021, anyone found with a gel ball blaster in Western Australia could face jail time and up to a $36,000 fine. One of the precipitating events for the ban was a 4-hour siege at a pharmacy in Applecross, a suburb of Perth, where the man at the centre of the siege was wielding a gel ball blaster. After the formal ban of gel ball blasters in Western Australia, Queensland remains the last state where gel ball blasters are legal in Australia. In 2024, Queensland has restricted sale to juveniles.

=== China ===
In Mainland China, there were moral panics by media similar to those involving airsoft, triggering a joint meeting from the Chinese authority in 2018 to "crackdown and regulate illegal activities/crimes involving guns and explosive items". In September 2020, the Deputy Minister of Public Security, Lin Rui, announced on a video conference of "nationwide special action on crackdown and regulation of online-purchased criminal/illegal imitation guns" (全国打击整治网售仿真枪违法犯罪专项行动) that the Ministry of Public Security, Office of the Central Cyberspace Affairs, General Administration of Customs, State Administration for Market Regulation, State Post Bureau and other local authorities will be jointly working to inspect and confiscate any toy guns, gel ball blasters and other replica/imitation guns that violate the regulation standards, clamping down on the manufacturing, sale and trafficking, and encouraging the public to report in offenders. Although more details are yet to come out, many in China have seen this as the official banning of gel ball blasters. Most toy gun manufacturers and retailers have since switched to foam dart guns and non-shooting, toy orbeez gun shell-ejecting prop guns.

=== Singapore ===
Gel blaster games are typically organized independently or alongside Nerf / foam blaster games, and the rules for gel blasters are usually at the discretion of the organizers. Milsim clothing, fully black-painted or realistic blasters are disallowed in most public and open-area games to avoid causing alarm. In 2021, a law was passed to effectively regulate and distinguish replica guns from real firearms as they are unlikely to cause injuries or death. Products like Hydro Strike's and Zuru Xshot are available in major retail toy stores, and police-approved blasters are sold in local online and hobbyist stores. Gel blasters are controlled items and importing or purchasing from overseas sellers is subject to approval by the police.

=== United States ===
In the United States, the regulation of gel blasters varies across states and municipalities. Some jurisdictions classify them as toys, while others regulate them under imitation firearm or airsoft legislation. For example, in New York, gel blasters are treated as imitation firearms and are subject to restrictions on sale and public display. In California, they fall under the state's imitation firearm laws, which restrict their public use and require specific coloration to distinguish them from real firearms. By contrast, states such as Texas and Florida generally allow their sale and use with fewer restrictions, provided they are not misused in public or criminal contexts.

At the federal level, gel blasters are not specifically defined as firearms. However, they may fall within broader provisions for imitation firearms, including the requirement that toy guns be marked with a blaze orange tip under U.S. Code Title 15 §5001. As a result, regulation is largely determined by state and local governments.

== See also ==
- Airsoft gun
- Laser Tag
- Nerf
- Paintball gun
