= MilSim =

Recreational military combat simulation

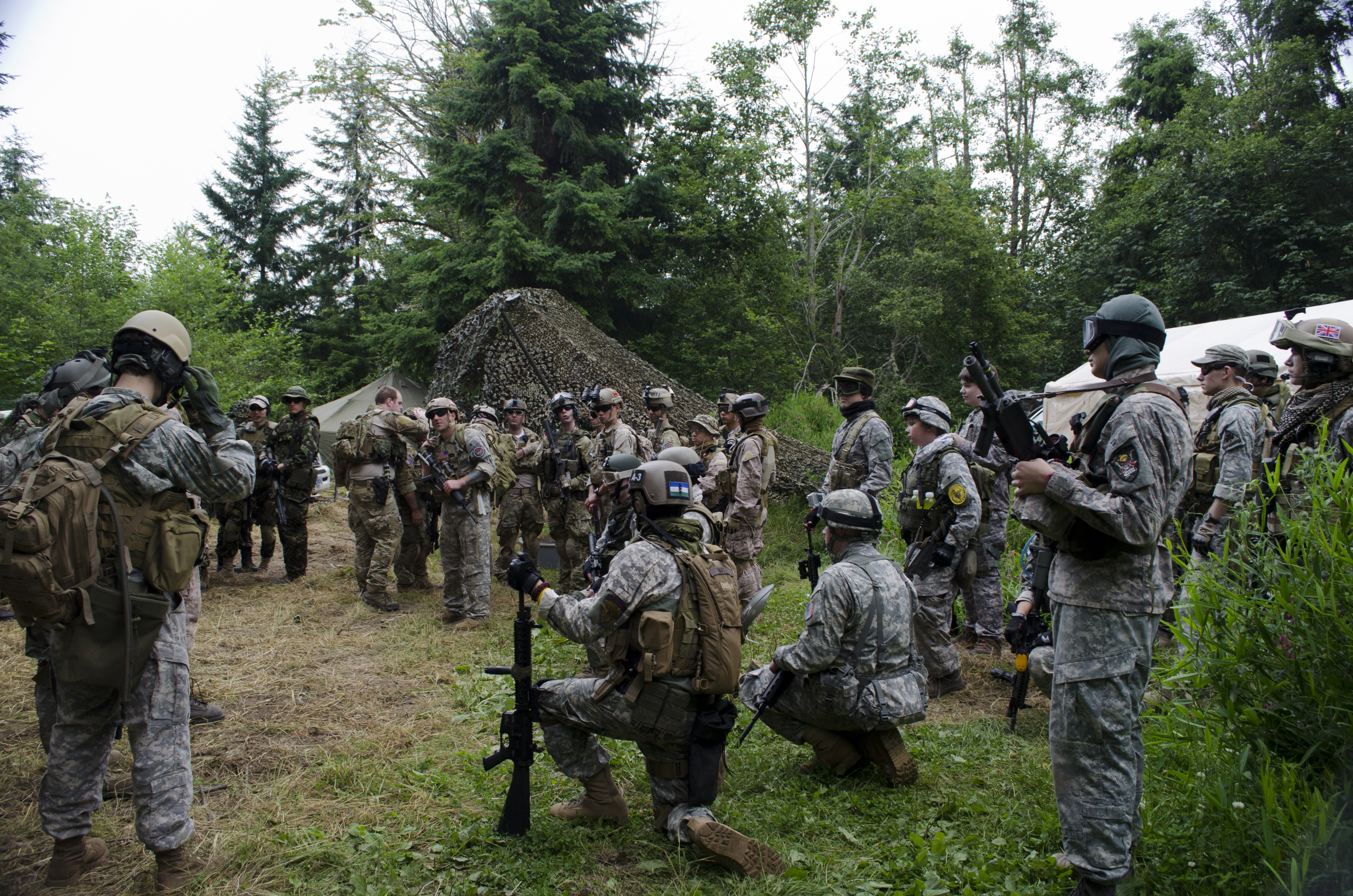
- Attendees at MilSim event "Total War", in Orting, Washington, U.S.
- First played: 1980s in Japan

Characteristics
- Contact: Dependent on ruleset
- Mixed-sex: Any
- Equipment: Varies

MilSim, an abbreviation of military simulation, refers to live-acted simulation of armed conflict scenarios conducted by civilians for entertainment, sporting, or nostalgic purposes. It has been described as both a form of "extreme sport" and as historical reenactment.

== Overview ==
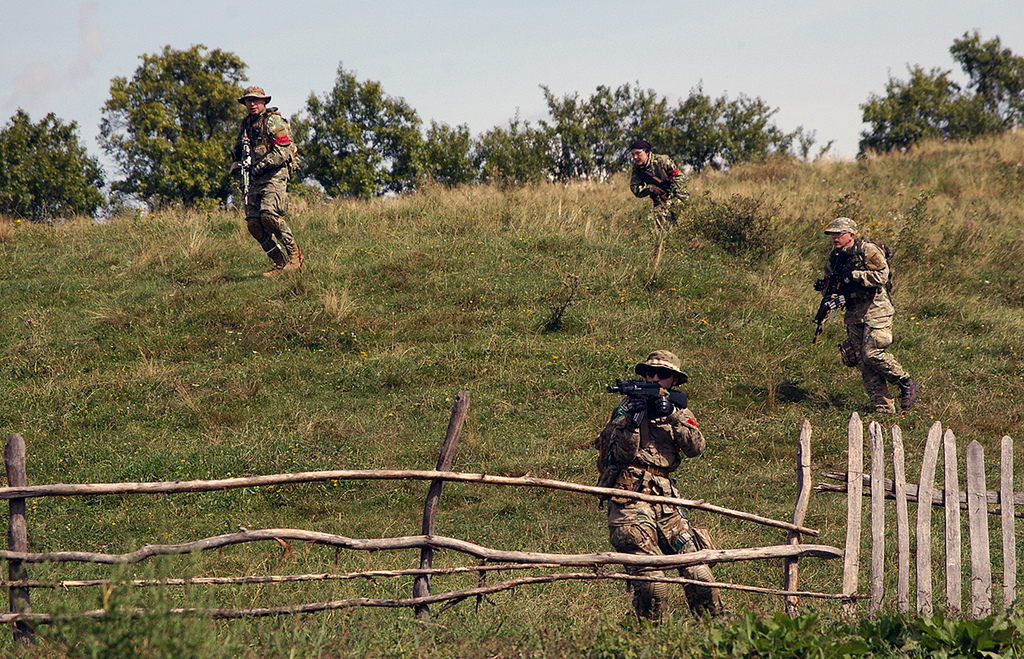
A team of MilSim players advancing through a field

MilSim includes activities that strive to provide an experience of combat, simulate battlefield missions, or replicate military service-style training. The training is simulated because participants engage in mock scenarios and do not actually engage in real conflicts or use real weaponry. There are several forms of MilSim: physical shooting sports (e.g. airsoft, paintball, or laser tag) with an emphasis on realism based on military scenarios and team tactics; historical reenactment of famous battles; stylistic imitations of a specific military era or focus, such as cosplaying; and military-themed e-sports (e.g. video games). Airsoft guns are used commonly in MilSim due to their cosmetic realism, satisfactory external ballistics, compatibility with genuine firearm accessories, and inexpensive ammunition. Alternatively, mock weapons which fire blanks and blank adapted guns may be used to add immersion in events such as MilSim West. Gel ball blasters are also used by MilSim players who live in countries where airsoft guns are either restricted or banned by law.

Events can span between historical or imaginary battles, law enforcement-style CQC engagements, or freestyle urban/jungle warfare-themed light infantry skirmishes. Large events usually have rigid requirements for entry, and can last several days without leaving the playfield. The experience often includes camping, food preparation, transportation, and other military logistics. MilSim differs from the sports of airsoft or paintball - though all rely on tactics and marksmanship, MilSim has a focus on authenticity to real-world military doctrines. There are often fireteams with designated roles, such as simulated combat medics and support gunners.

Loosely originating in Japan in the 1980s, MilSim events are now bolstered by an active Internet scene. An American presenter, MSATO, claims that MilSim is the "fastest-growing extreme sport worldwide." The largest events can attract thousands of attendees, though players must often source their own equipment, such as specific uniforms, radios, and weapons. Attendees are diverse, consisting of hobbyists, military veterans, or enthusiasts as young as 13. In the United Kingdom, airsoft organizers run in conjunction with Live Action Role-Players (LARP) at British Army training facilities, such as Copehill Down and Catterick Garrison. Elsewhere, combat stages are often salvaged from abandoned buildings and private woodland. Many of the larger playfields are leased to ROTC groups or civilian first responders for their own simulation training.

== Reenactments ==
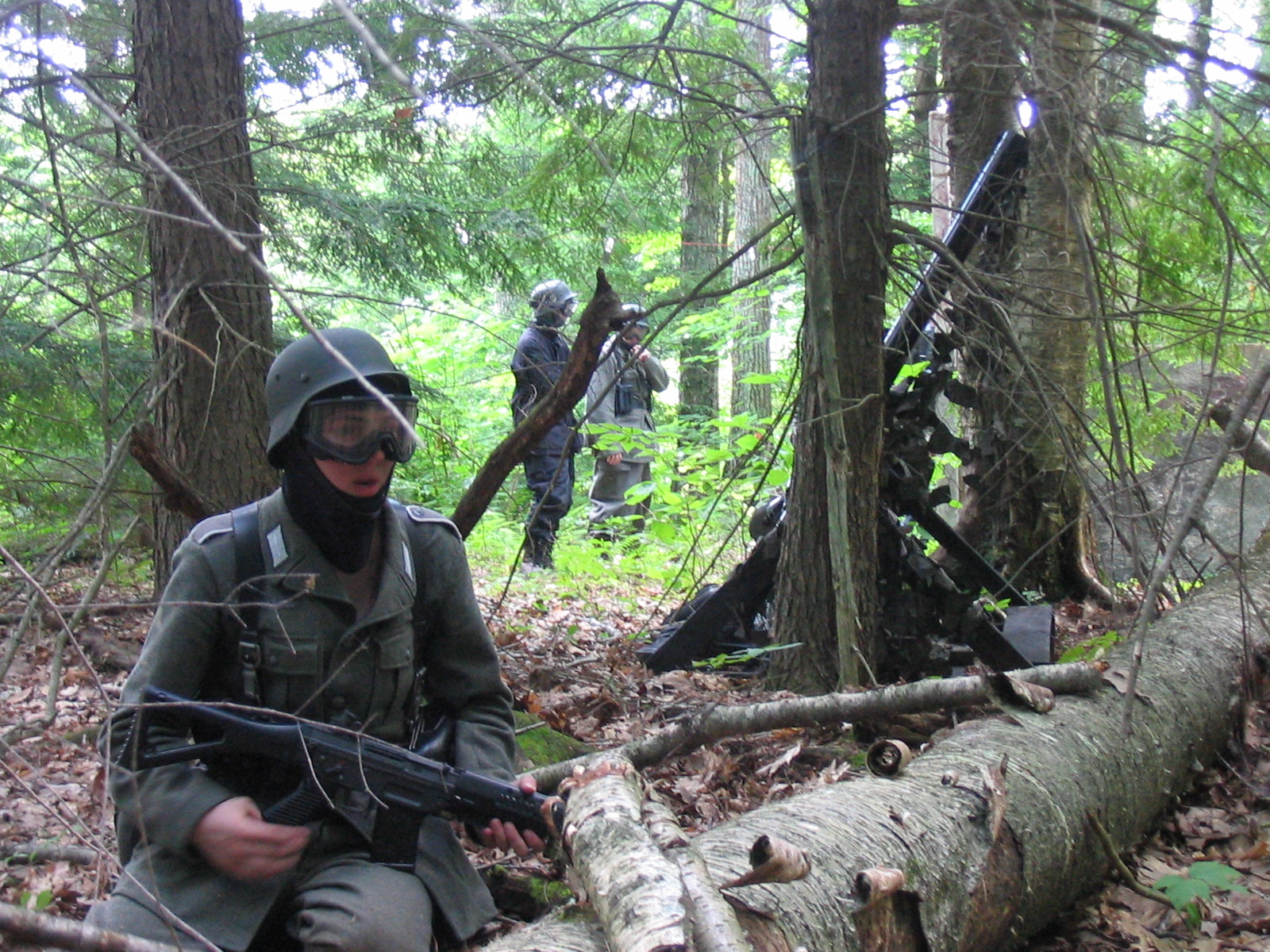
MilSim players wearing outfits loosely based on Wehrmacht uniforms during a World War II battle scenario

Similar to historical reenactments, MilSim reenactments have a focus on historical accuracy to a specific event. All weaponry, uniforms, and equipment are suggested or required to be period-accurate. Food, terminology, and living arrangements can be inspired by the period; such as World War II, Desert Storm, or the Yugoslav Wars. Sides are usually not glorified, and attendees are encouraged to see battles through the eyes of an ordinary soldier.

Unlike historical reenactments, which are largely scripted, MilSim events involve creating strategies - on a platoon scale and squad scale - to defeat opponents. War historians are occasionally consulted to help stage the field. Regularly, military veterans from several nations will attend or organize events, giving further accuracy to first-aid training, current terminology, clothing, and tactics. When attendees must source their own equipment, costs can sometimes be thousands of dollars. Occasionally, loaner equipment is provided to beginners.

== Simulations ==
MilSim simulations are fictionalized scenarios with a realistic objective; these can include hostage rescue, bomb defusal, or fictionalized skirmishes, and include law enforcement or militia-themed scenarios. These promote a "tactical playstyle" above casual airsoft. Players are often given an extensive briefing, containing storylines, mission tactics, and rules of engagement. Most simulations strive for immersion and tension in players. MilSim simulations are usually smaller, and more frequent, than reenactments.

== Uses ==
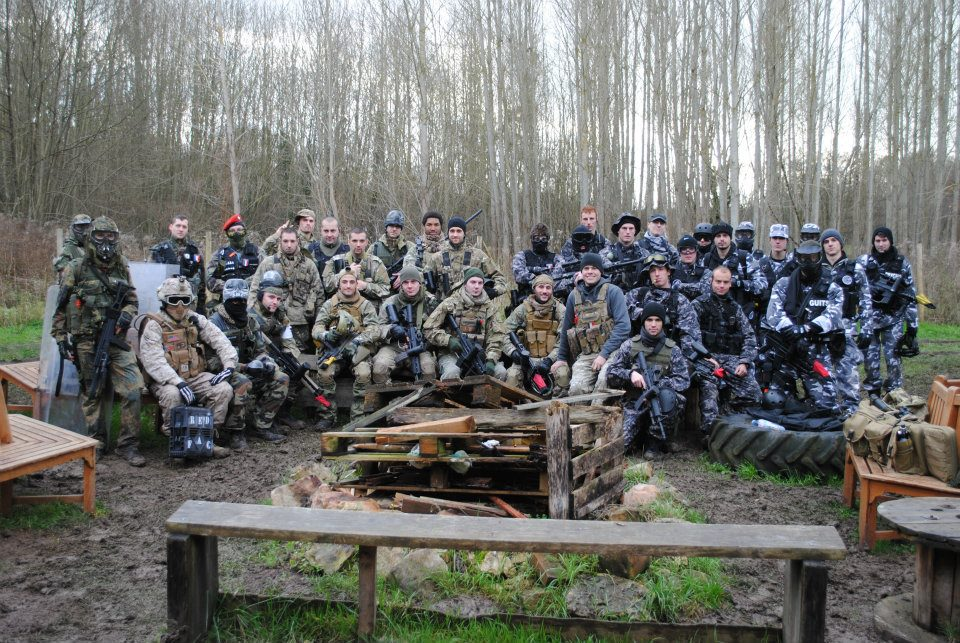
A French MilSim group

Robert Silverman of Vocativ, embedded in a two-day MilSim (inspired by 2003's Tears of the Sun), writes that "the appeal is in ... the realism of an unreal world, plus a deep desire for the camaraderie and teamwork you'd find in a real military unit." He speculates that the "pure adrenaline free from inflicting actual harm ... strikes at something embedded deep within the core of sports."

Places Journal, referring to the presence of veteran and civilian players describe MilSim as a "ladder leading up to the war and a ladder for coming back down". Notably, veterans (rather than, or in addition to, mental health care) "use war games as self-administered PTSD treatment".

The movement of troops among the cacophony of heavy machines provides an immersive sensory environment for exposure therapy. With social support, it may be possible for vets to defeat their darkest fears (although Veterans Affairs advises against high-adrenaline treatments that might trigger flashbacks).

Recently, advances in airsoft replica authenticity have led numerous law enforcement and military units to train with airsoft guns in CQB/CQC environments. MilSim events have encouraged the US Army to promote enlistment.

== Video games ==
Mil-sim is also the descriptor for a genre of video games, often overlapping with the tactical shooter genre, containing more "realistic" mechanics and consequences than typical first-person shooters or action games. Examples include Arma and Squad that place greater emphasis on military tactics and procedure, with Arma sometimes being used for military training and mission rehearsal. Other tactical shooters, such as Red Orchestra: Ostfront 41-45, Insurgency: Sandstorm, and Hell Let Loose are sometimes mistaken as mil-sims in which they feature realistic aspects in their gameplay that make it a more "hardcore" shooter, but are generally classified as tactical shooters rather than mil-sims. Mil-sims often share many features with tactical shooters, but can commonly be differentiated by the following characteristics:

- Tactics similar to those used by real life military are effective, with players encouraged to coordinated tactics and procedures rather than relying primarily on individual skill.
- Emphasis on simulating the experience of operating as a regular military combatant.
- Players are organized into a structured hierarchy of units and roles, with greater emphasis on teamwork and coordination.
- Voice chat is structured around player roles, units, and command hierarchy through designated communication channels.
- Gameplay often takes place on a large scale, involving numerous players, infantry, vehicles, and other military assets.
- Limited base building, allowing players to construct defensive positions, fortifications and fire support emplacements.
- Players may assume fire support roles, such as artillery, mortar, or forward observer roles, which support other units without directly engaging the enemy.
- Ammunition and resources are limited, requiring players to organize their own logistics and resupply.
- Realism is applied across a wider range of gameplay systems, with mechanics such as weapon handling, ballistics, movement, equipment, and character condition affecting gameplay.
- Vehicles may be simulated with greater detail, including more realistic damage models, dedicated crew roles such as driver and gunner, limited ammunition, fuel, cargo, and mobility.
- Vehicle operation is commonly restricted to a first-person perspective for greater immersion, with players viewing the vehicle from their respective crew positions.

Mil-sim, in the context of video games, may also be used to describe unofficial, player organized communities or enterprises whose purpose is to simulate military operations on platforms not traditionally designed for such play with the use of mods or sandbox mechanics. Such communities exist as niches on games like Battlefield, and Grand Theft Auto V, for example.

== See also ==
- Small Arms Weapons Effects Simulator
- Renaissance fair
- Urban exploration
- Military simulation
